= Downtown Tampa =

- Neighborhood
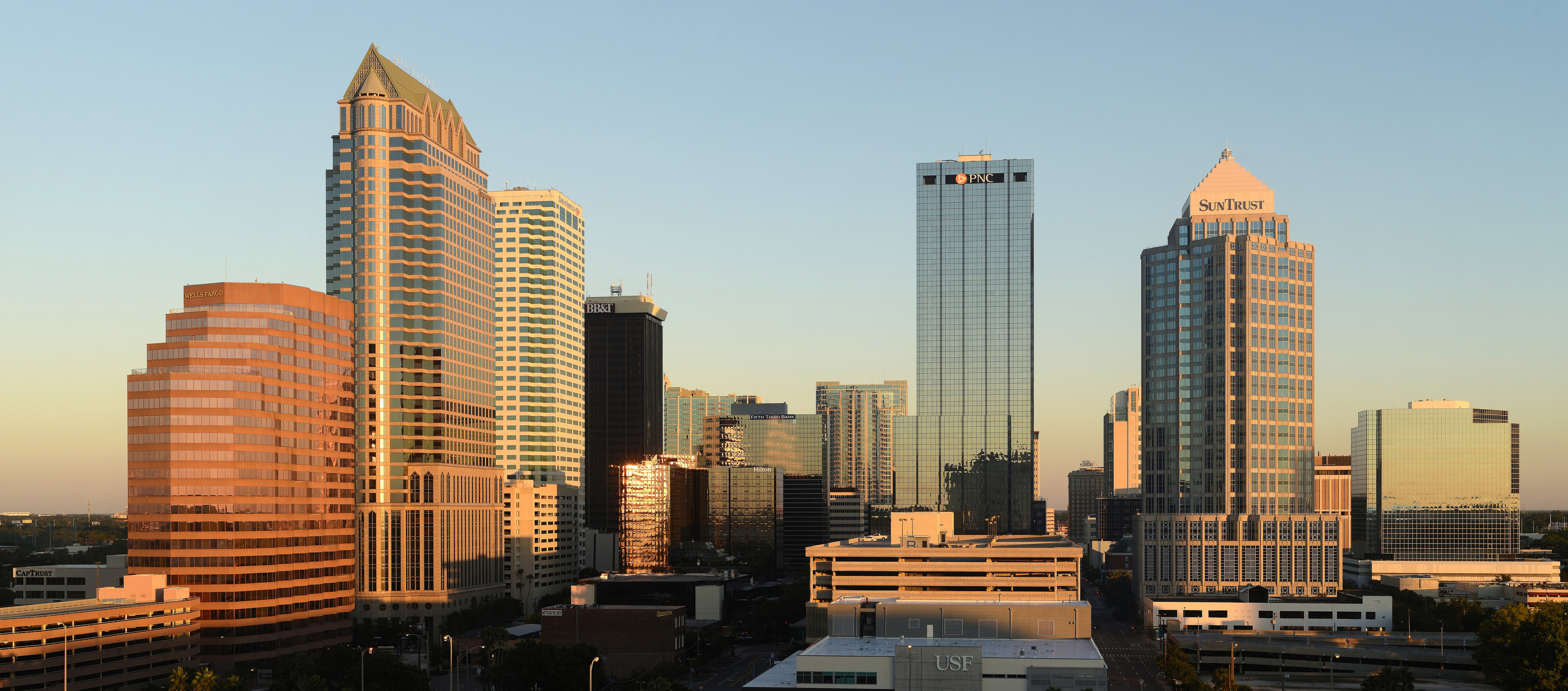
- View of downtown to north, from the Embassy Terrace Hotel, at sunrise

- Location within the state of Florida
- Coordinates: 27°56′59″N 82°27′23″W
- Country: United States
- State: Florida
- County: Hillsborough
- City: Tampa

Government
  - Mayor: Jane Castor (D)

Population (2024)
  - Total: 16,044
- Time zone: UTC-5 (Eastern (EST))
  - Summer (DST): UTC-4 (EDT)
- ZIP codes: 33602, 33606

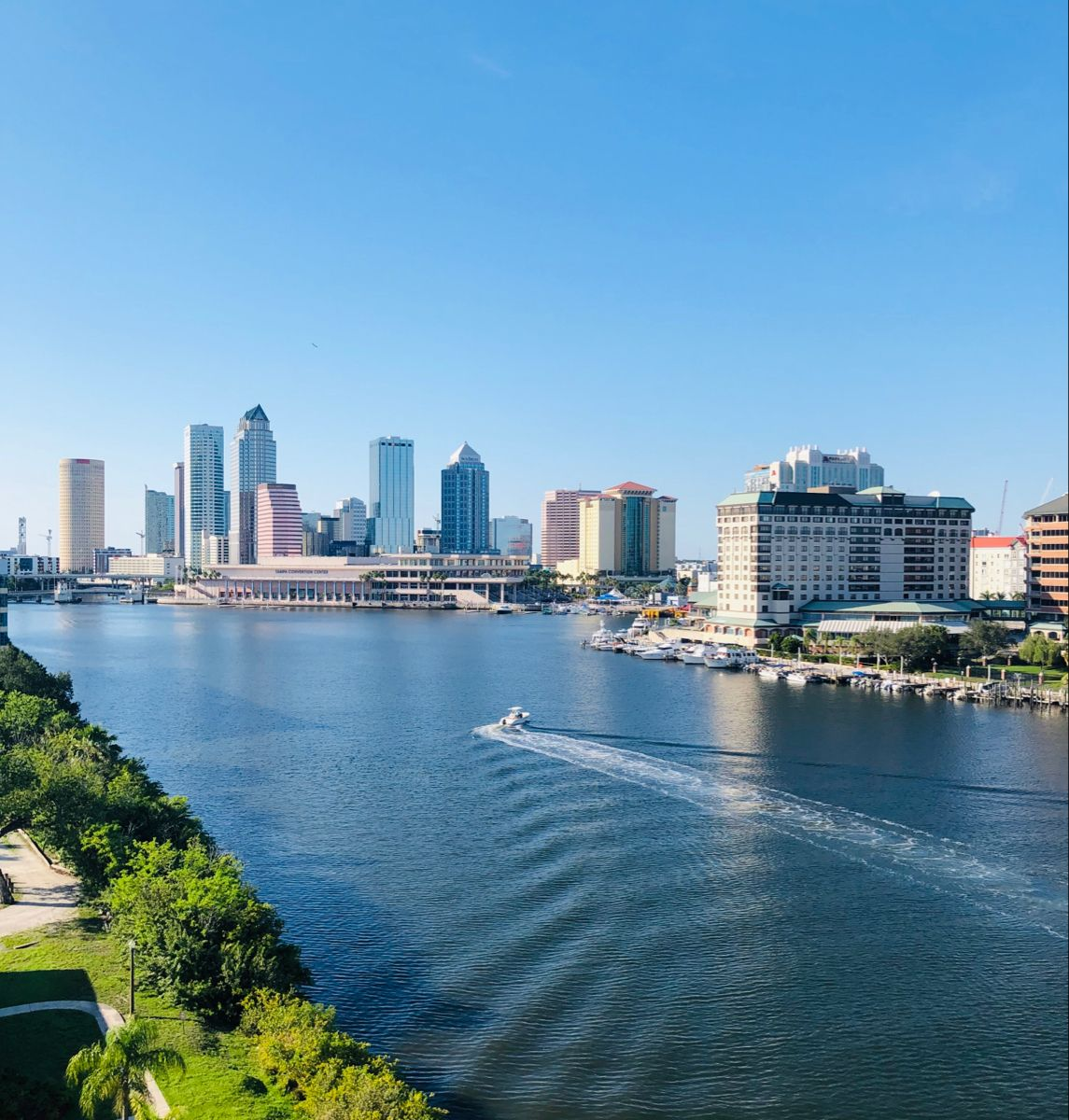
View of downtown looking north, from Davis Islands overlooking Seddon Channel.

Downtown Tampa is the central business district of Tampa, Florida, United States, and the chief financial district of the Tampa Bay Area.

It is second only to Westshore regarding employment in the area. Companies with a major presence downtown include Bank of America, Frontier Communications, Marshall & Ilsley, PNC Financial Services, SunTrust, Sykes Enterprises, TECO Energy and Truist Financial. The Tampa Convention Center is located on the river.

== Description ==
Downtown Tampa is bounded by the Hillsborough River to the west, Channelside to the east, Interstate 275 to the north, Davis Islands and Harbour Island to the south. The total area for the area is 521 acres (2.11 km^{2}). Historical Fort Brooke was located at the southern end of downtown Tampa, near the mouth of the Hillsborough River. The TECO Streetcar takes passengers from downtown to other core areas of Tampa.

== Arts and culture ==
=== Aquarium ===
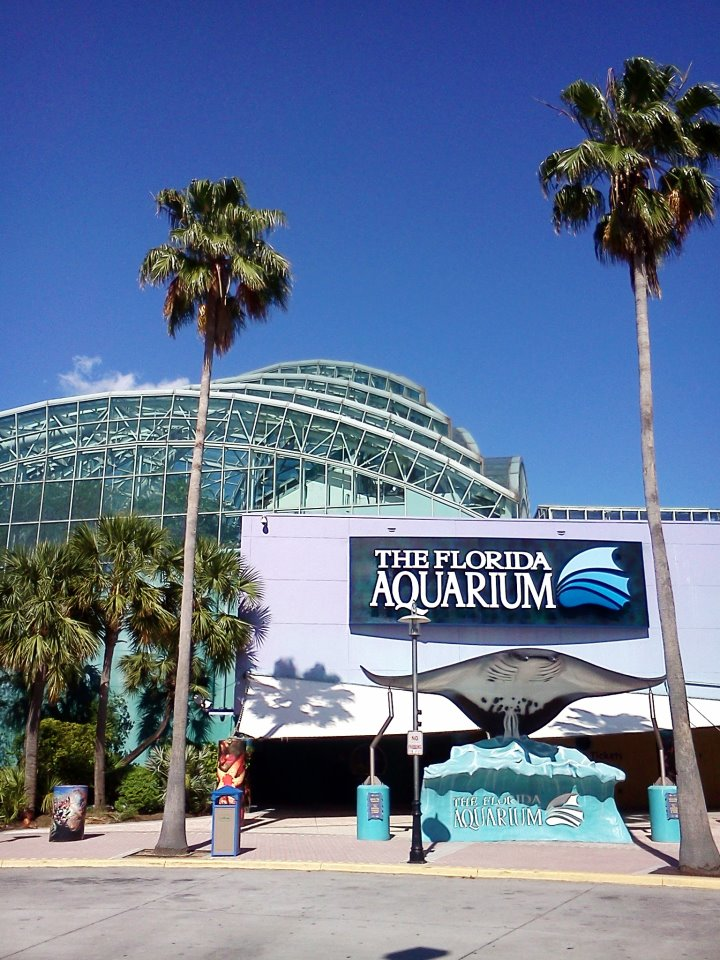
Florida Aquarium

The Florida Aquarium is a large scale, 250,000-square-foot (23,000 m^{2}) aquarium and is accredited by the Association of Zoos and Aquariums. The facility is home to more than 20,000 aquatic plants and animals from Florida and all over the world. The facility is located in the Channel District near the SS American Victory and the Port of Tampa's cruise terminals.

=== Museums ===
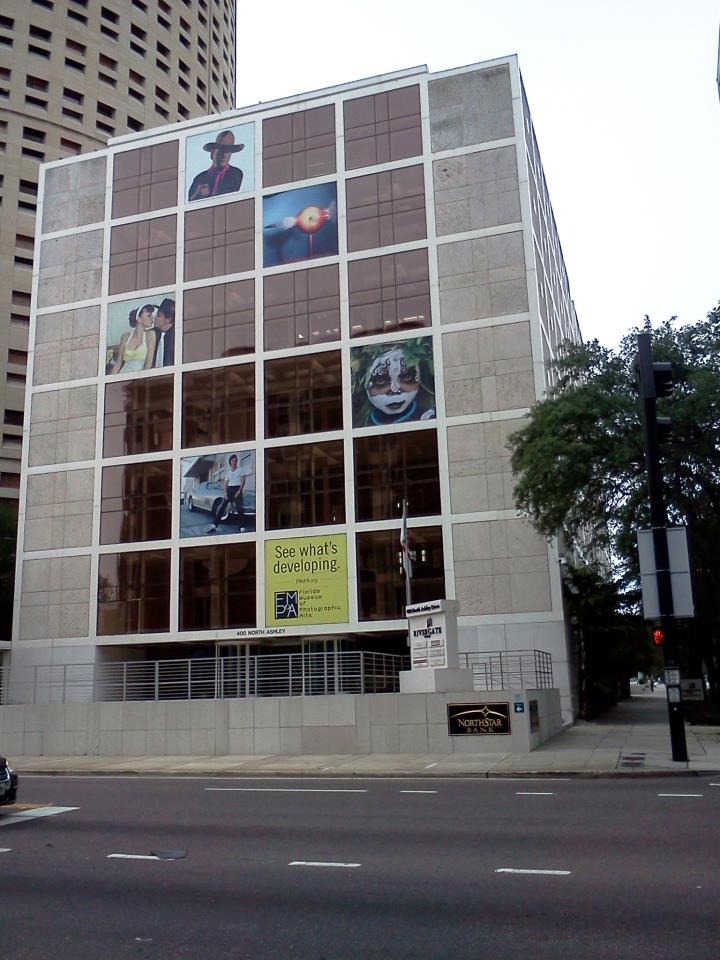
Florida Museum of Photographic Arts

- The Florida Museum of Photographic Arts (FMoPA) occupies the 2nd and 3rd floors of the architecturally significant Cube an adjacent to Rivergate Tower. FMoPA is part of the Waterfront Arts District, along with the Tampa Museum of Art and Glazer Children's Museum, all located alongside the Tampa Riverwalk.

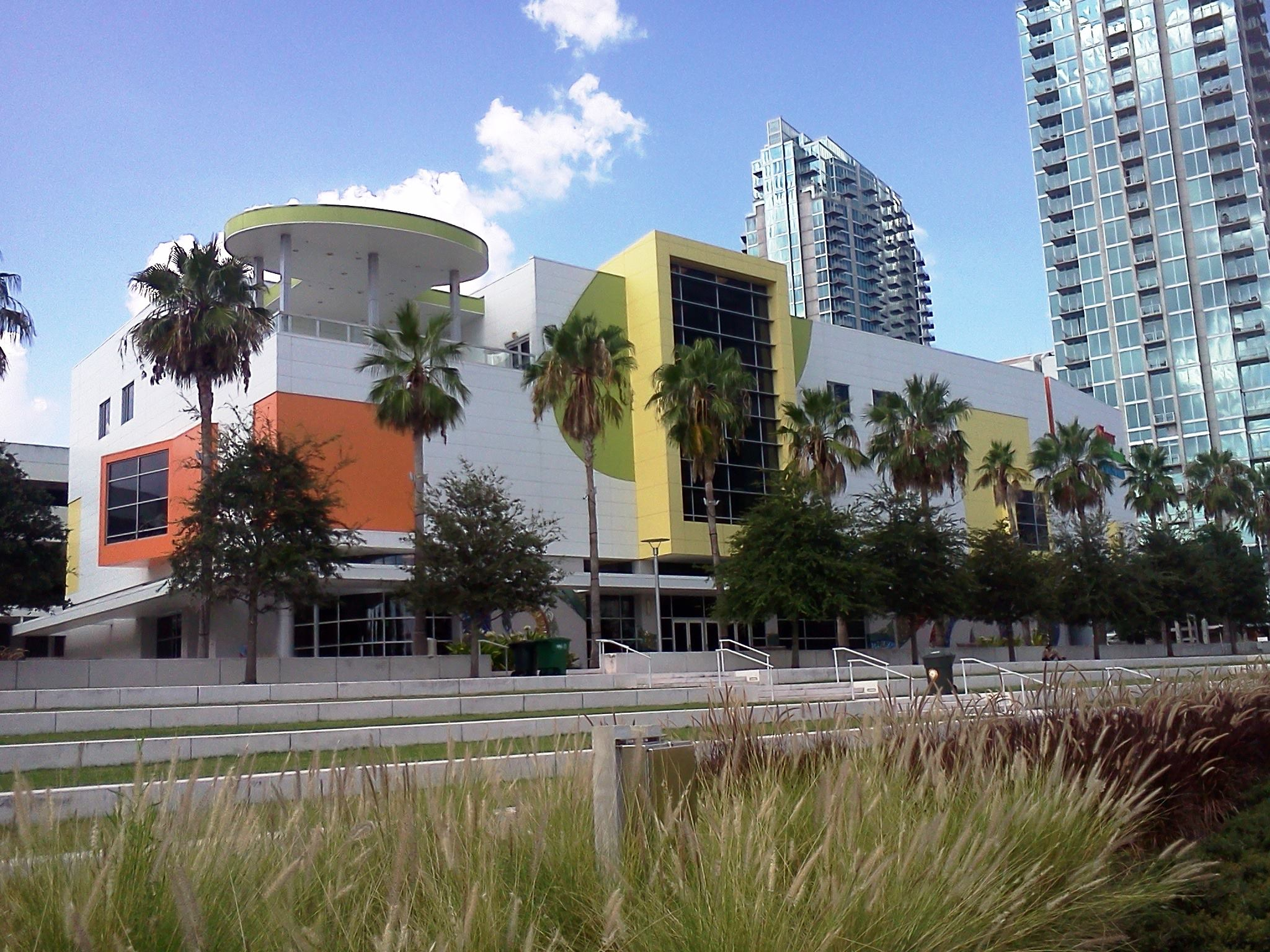
Glazer Children's Museum

- The Glazer Children's Museum is located in central downtown, next door to the Tampa Museum of Art and Curtis Hixon Park, alongside the Tampa Riverwalk. It is part of the Waterfront Arts District. Based in a 53,000-square-foot (4,900 m^{2}) facility in downtown Tampa, Florida, the Museum has 170 hands-on exhibits in multiple themed areas. Exhibits are designed to engage children in the discovery process through play.

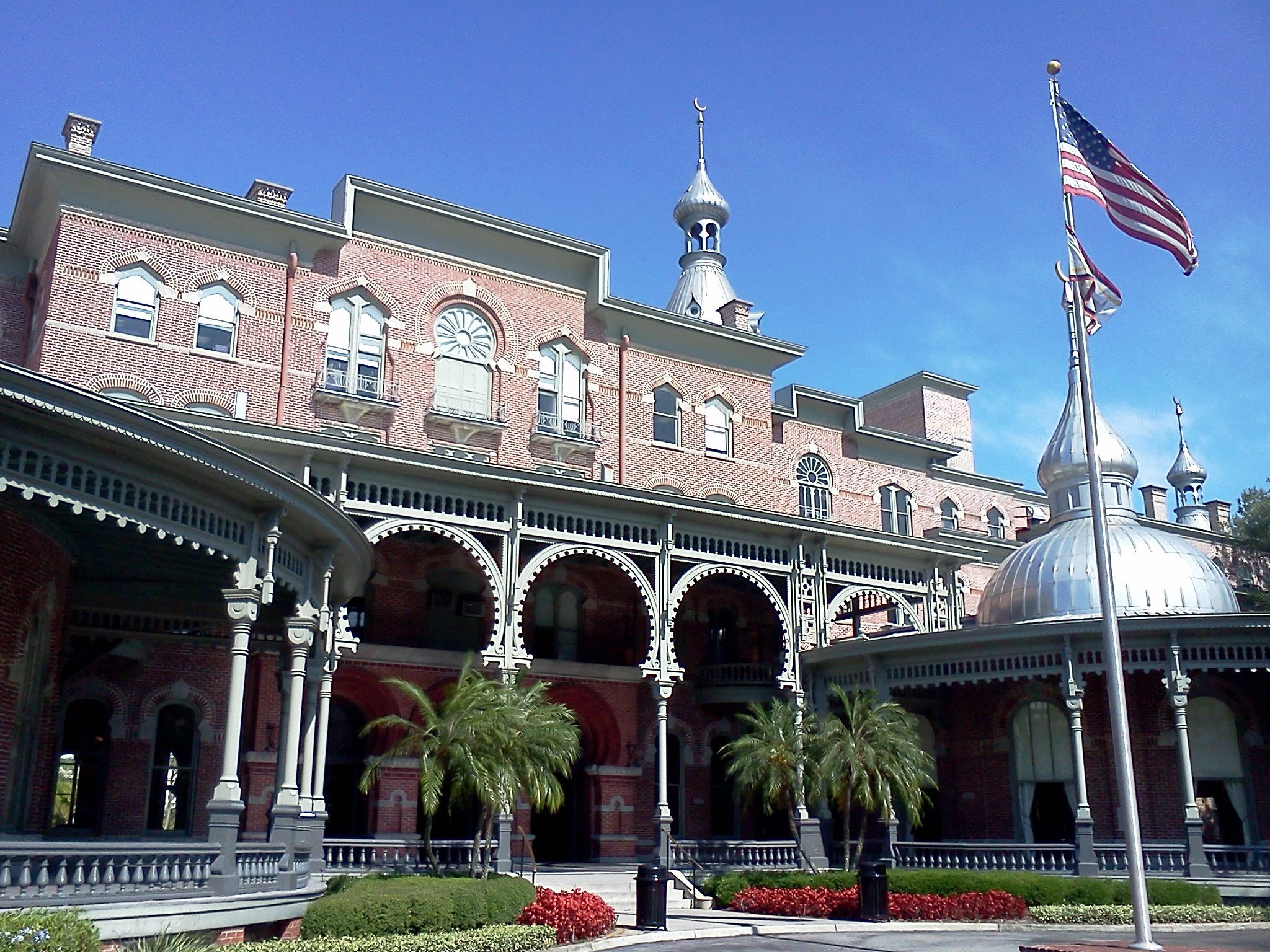
Henry B. Plant Museum

- The Henry B. Plant Museum is located in the south wing of Plant Hall on the University of Tampa's campus, at 401 West Kennedy Boulevard. The museum's exhibits focus on the Gilded Age lifestyle of the old Tampa Bay Hotel's guests during the 1890s, when Tampa was experiencing sudden population and economic growth, including the beginning of the local tourist industry.
- The SS American Victory a Victory ship built during World War II and is located in the Channel District near the Florida Aquarium. American Victory was preserved in 1998 to serve as a museum ship. She is the main feature of the American Victory Ship & Museum, also known as the American Victory Mariners Memorial & Museum Ship.

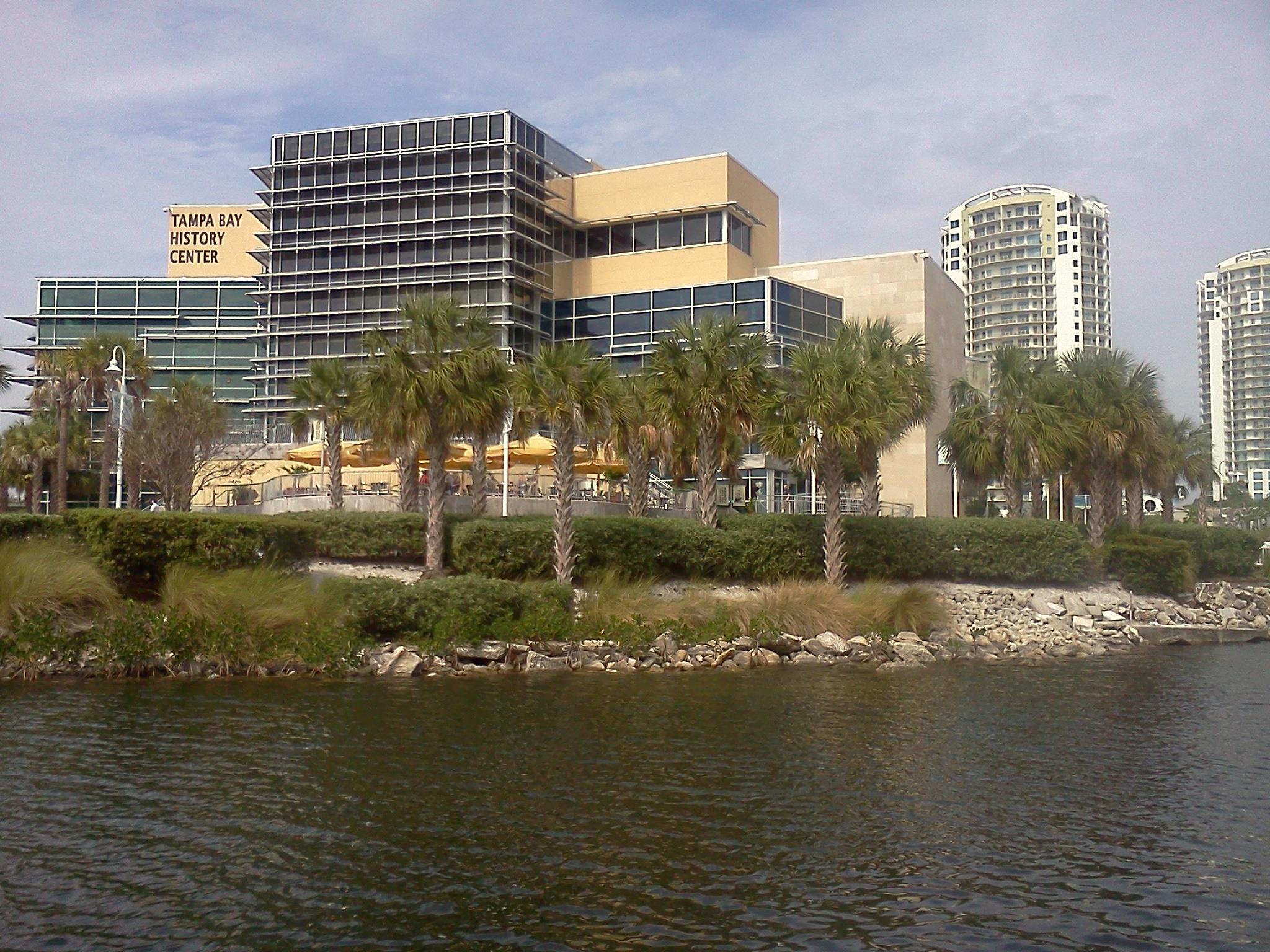
Tampa Bay History Center

- The Tampa Bay History Center is history museum located in the southern part of downtown near the Channel District and Benchmark International Arena. Exhibits include coverage of the Tampa Bay area's first native inhabitants, Spanish conquistadors, and historical figures who shaped the area's history, as well as a reproduction of a 1920s cigar store.

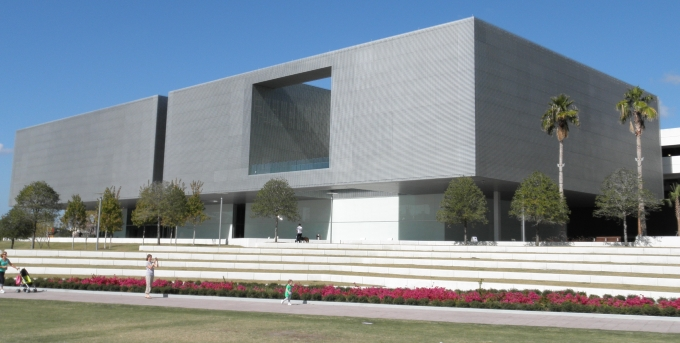
Tampa Museum of Art

- The Tampa Museum of Art is located in central downtown, next door to the Glazer Children's Museum and Curtis Hixon Park, alongside the Tampa Riverwalk. The museum was founded in 1979 and debuted an innovative new building in 2010 on the banks of Hillsborough River just north of its original site. The current location is part of Tampa's Riverwalk and the Waterfront Arts District along with the Glazer Children's Museum and the Florida Museum of Photographic Arts and includes a gift shop and SONO Cafe, a restaurant operated by Mise En Place.

=== Performing arts ===
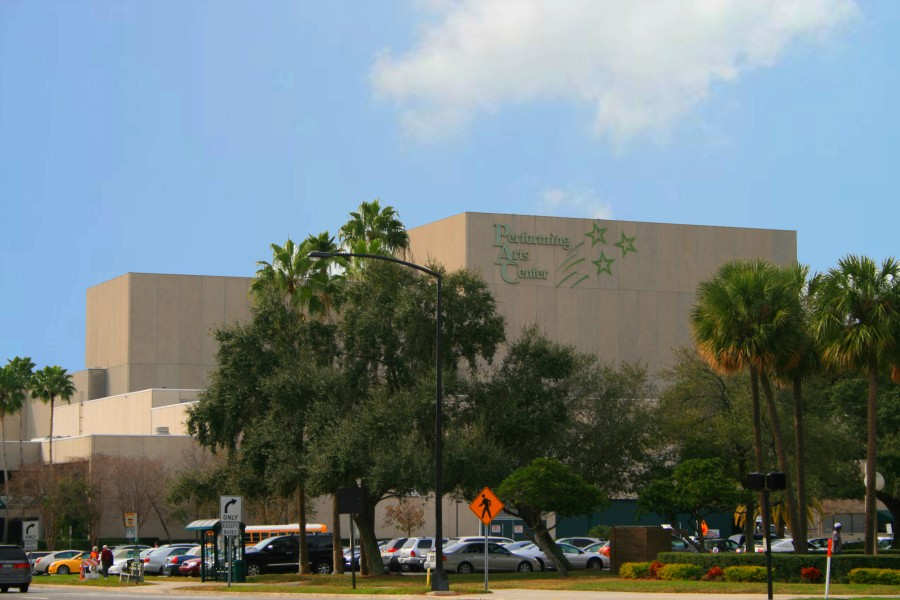
The Straz Center, formerly called Tampa Bay Performing Arts Center (TBPAC)

The David A. Straz Jr. Center for the Performing Arts opened its doors as the Tampa Bay Performing Arts Center, Tampa, Florida in July 1987 and has welcomed more than 10 million guests. The Straz Center is located in northern downtown on a 9-acre (36,000 m^{2}) site along the east bank of the Hillsborough River. As the second largest performing arts complex in the Southeastern United States (behind the Adrienne Arsht Center for the Performing Arts), the 335,000-square-foot (31,100 m^{2}) venue provides an environment for a variety of events. It has a leading Broadway series, produces grand opera, is the home of the resident professional theater company Jobsite Theater, and also presents a wide variety of concerts and other events.

=== Theaters ===
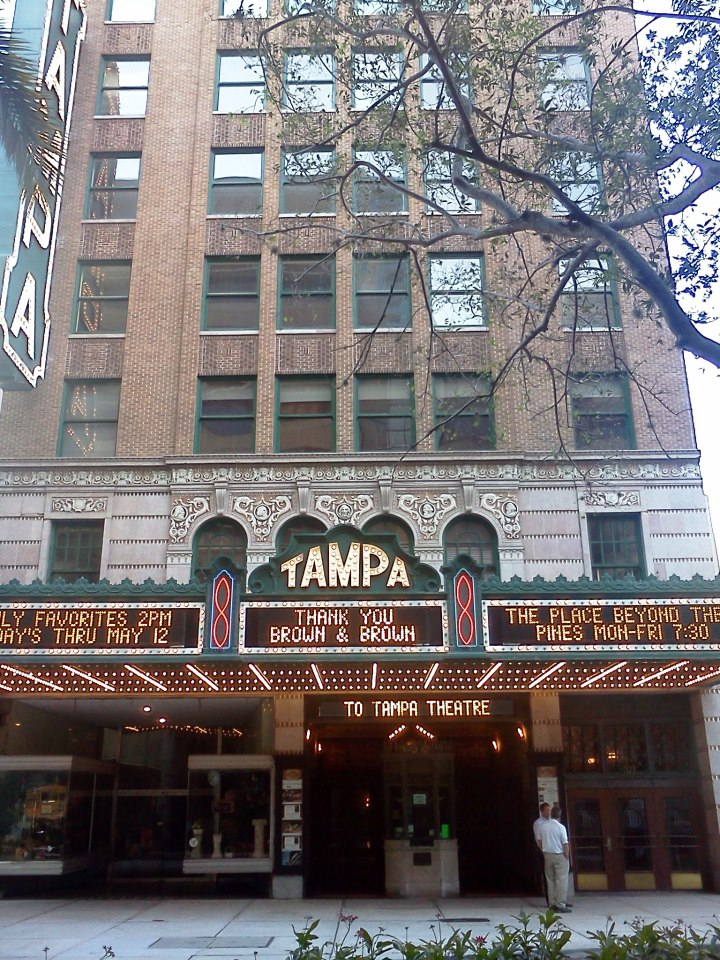
Tampa Theater

The Tampa Theatre is a historic U.S. theater and city landmark in the Uptown District of downtown Tampa, Florida. On January 3, 1978, it was added to the U.S. National Register of Historic Places. The Theatre features a wide range of independent, foreign, and documentary films on a daily basis. It is Tampa's only non-profit movie theater and operating costs are largely covered by its membership program, various corporate sponsors as well as ticket sales. It has periodically been used as a backdrop for movies, MTV videos and local programming.

== Downtown Districts ==
=== Uptown District ===
Also known as the River Arts District, this northwestern chunk of downtown contains the majority of nightlife and dining in the neighborhood. Important cultural landmarks such as Tampa Theatre, Straz Center for the Performing Arts, the John F. Germany public library, Glazer Children's Museum, and the Tampa Museum of Art are all centered around Curtis Hixon Waterfront Park, which has been called "Tampa's town square". Collectively, this area represents the focal point of downtown proper due to having a large concentration of interest points and establishments.

=== Channel District ===
Although technically downtown, Channelside is often thought to be adjacent to the main CBD. This district is the location for many prominent downtown venues. The Tampa Convention Center, Benchmark International Arena, Tampa Bay History Center, the Florida Aquarium and the SS American Victory are located in the Channel District. Twin 30 story condos were completed in 2007, called the Towers of Channelside. Many other residential mid and high-rises have been completed since. Many locals know the Channel District (often abbreviated to Channelside in local parlance) for its nightlife. The Channelside Bay Plaza, which has views of the downtown skyline, is located in the middle of the district. Entrepreneurs have founded companies that operate NEVs to shuttle clubgoers to/from Channelside and Tampa's other core districts: Hyde Park, SoHo, Downtown, and Ybor City.

=== University Area ===
The University area is the city's educational hub and is the location of The University of Tampa a medium-sized private co-educational university. Making up the City's western boundary and located just across the Hillsborough River from downtown the university is home to 6,900 students.

=== Encore ===
The northern half of downtown is undergoing huge construction projects including retail, condos, and a large grocery store. The district, which will fill the gray zone between Downtown and Historic Ybor, will be called "Encore" and will be a "city within a city". A stimulus grant amounting $38 million was secured to help fund the project, the remaining to be derived from private funding. It is expected to create thousands of jobs for the area including at least 1,000 permanent ones. The district is being created with its African-American heritage in mind, having been built over the site of the former Central Avenue Business District and later Central Park housing project.

=== Riverwalk ===
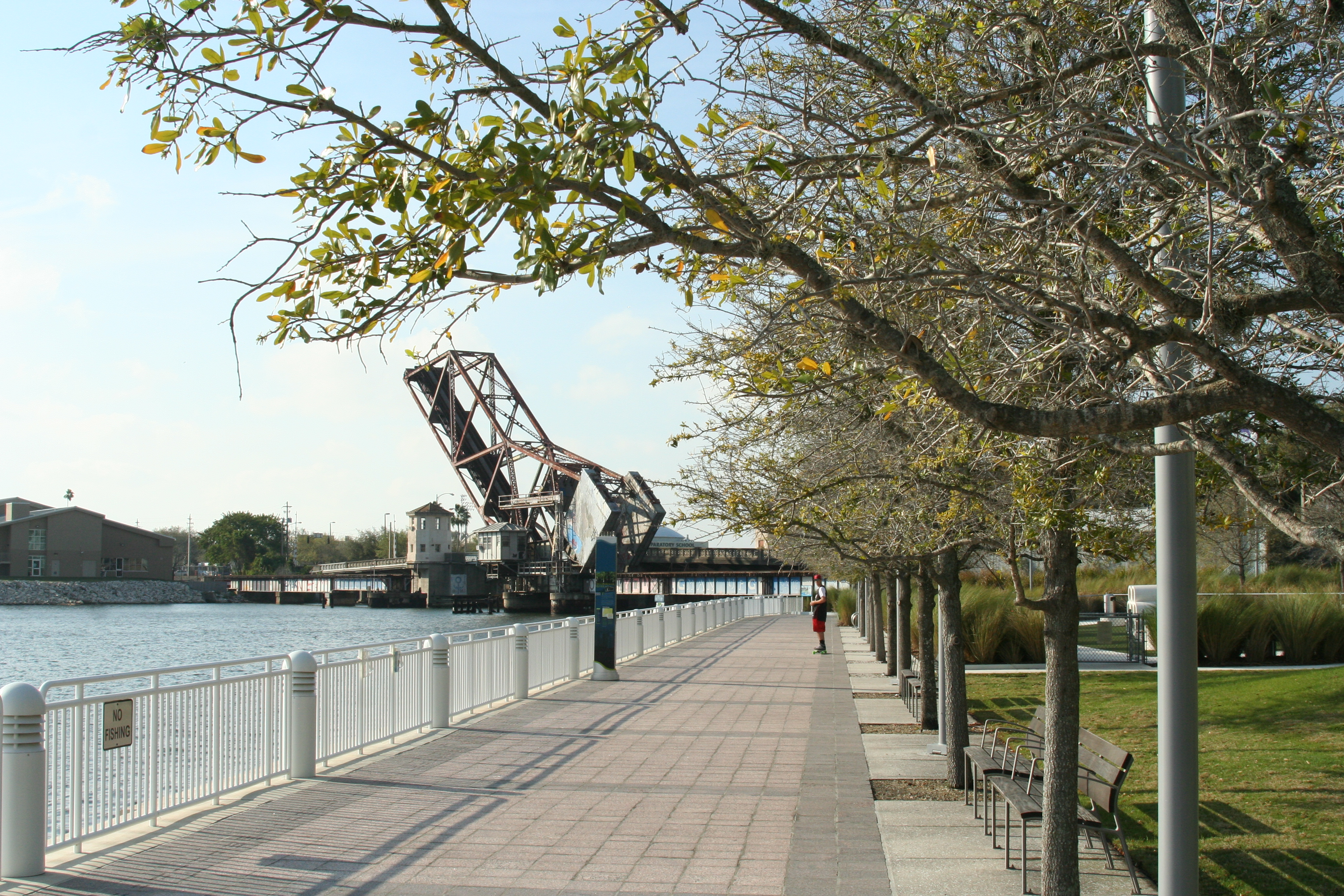
The Riverwalk alongside Curtis Hixon Park

The Tampa Riverwalk is a 2.4 mile long walking and biking trail that winds along the edge of Tampa's downtown, running along the Hillsborough River and the Garrison Channel from the Channel District on the southeast end to Waterworks Park to the northwest. The Riverwalk's wide pathways, boardwalks, and bridges connect most of Tampa's waterfront parks, attractions, sports and entertainment venues, and hotels, including the Tampa Convention Center, Benchmark International Arena, the Straz Center, and many others.

The idea for the Riverwalk was first proposed by mayor Bill Poe in the mid-1970s as a way to redevelop Tampa's downtown waterfront, which had long been dominated by large warehouses, port facilities, and other industrial uses. The project was initiated in 1976 with a short walkway of wooden planks behind old Curtis Hixon Hall. However, funding and interest waned, and the project stalled for almost 30 years until mayor Pam Iorio made completing the project a city priority upon taking office in 2003. Construction began in phases in the mid-2000s, and the originally planned Riverwalk was completed in 2016, with further extensions to be added on both ends. The total cost of the completed project will be about $32 million, with most of the funds coming the city of Tampa along with a $11 million grant from the United States Department of Transportation.

== Hotels and accommodations ==
Downtown Tampa has 9 hotels located throughout the downtown core that create a total of 2,791 rooms. Major hotels in downtown are:

- Courtyard by Marriott Tampa Downtown with 141 rooms is located in northern downtown in the arts district.
- Embassy Suites Tampa Downtown with 360 rooms is located in the south part of downtown and is connected via skybridge to the Tampa Convention Center.
- Barrymore Hotel Plaza Hotel with 316 rooms
- Hilton Hotel Downtown Tampa with 521 rooms
- Residence Inn By Marriott Tampa Downtown with 109 rooms is located in northern downtown in the arts district.
- Sheraton Tampa Riverwalk Hotel with 277 rooms is located in the center of downtown and sits along the Hillsborough River and the riverwalk.
- Tampa Marriott Waterside Hotel and Marina with 719 rooms is in southern downtown and is situated between the convention center and the Tampa Bay Times Forum.
- Westin Hotels Harbour Island with 299 rooms is located on Harbour Island and is just south of the convention center.

The following are boutique hotels:

- Aloft Hotels is in the former 8 story Mercantile Bank building. The hotel has 130 rooms and is located along the Hillsborough River
- Floridan Palace Hotel with 193 rooms, 15 Junior Executive Suites, and 3 Penthouse Suits is located in northern downtown near the Tampa Theatre
- Le Méridien in the old County Courthouse Building with 130 rooms.

== Transportation ==
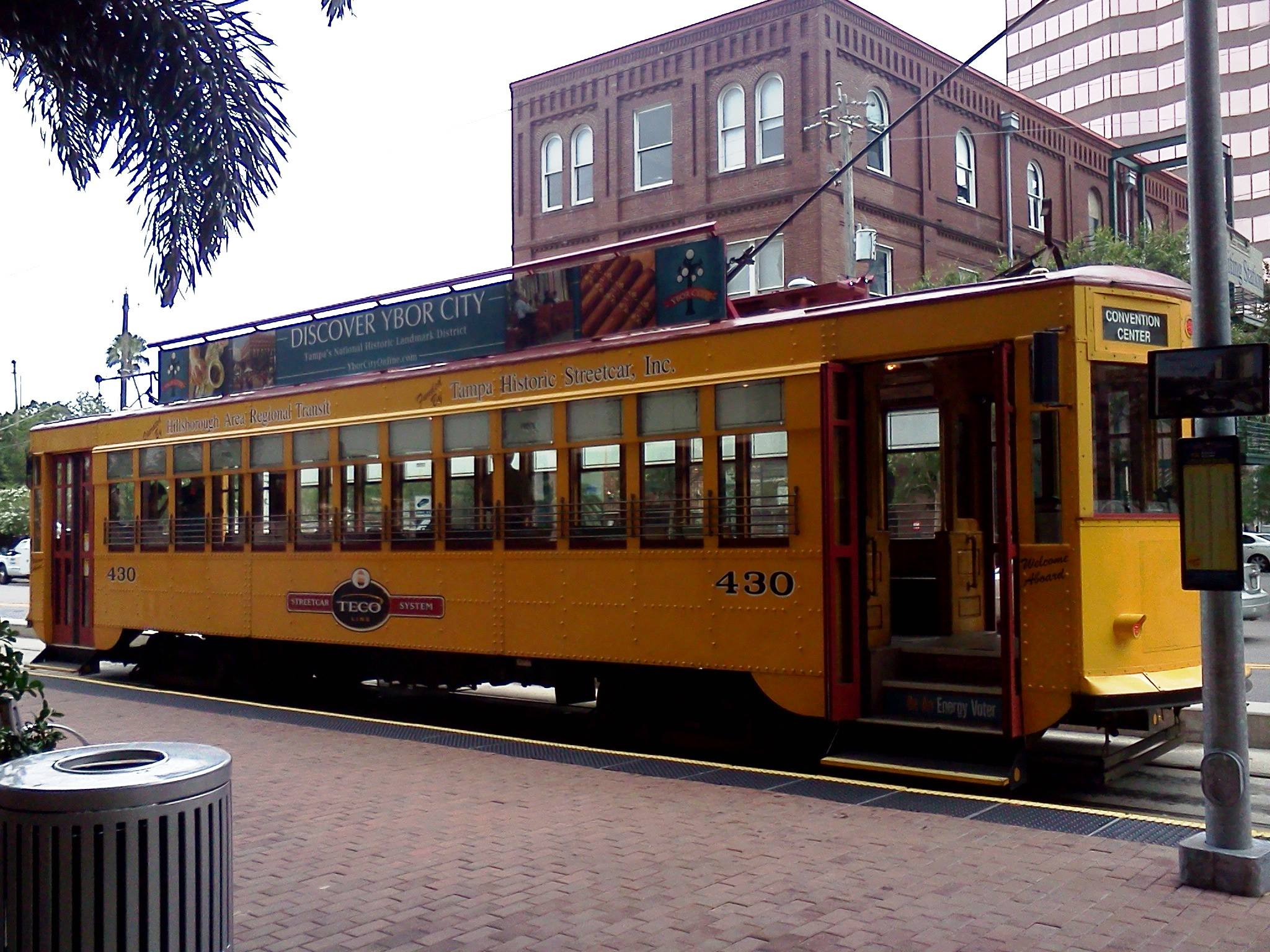
Street Car at Franklin and Whiting Street

Hillsborough Area Regional Transit (HART) operates Tampa's public transportation. HART operates many bus lines through downtown and also operates the TECO Line Streetcar, a 2.7 mile streetcar line that extends from central downtown through Channelside and into Ybor. HART's main hub, the Marion Transit Center is located in the north end of downtown and is serviced by 30 local and express routes and a future stop for HART's MetroRapid Green Line.

== See also ==
- Bayshore Boulevard, street known for its long sidewalk and waterfront view. Runs due southwest from downtown to Hyde Park and SoHo
- Harbour Island, adjacent to downtown and channelside south across the Garrison Channel.
- Hyde Park, historic neighborhood southwest of downtown abutting Bayshore and Kennedy Blvd.
- Tampa Heights, historic neighborhood just north of downtown, now northern end of Riverwalk.
- Westshore, a business district located adjacent to Tampa International Airport and Rocky Point. This area actually eclipses downtown itself for most jobs in the region.
- Ybor City, historic district adjacent to downtown from the northeast.
- Tampa City Hall
- Tampa Police Department
