= Experimental Skeleton =

American non-profit organization

The Experimental Skeleton is a non-profit artistic organization in Tampa, Florida that promotes visual arts throughout the area.

== History ==
During the last 15 years, there have been several attempts to revitalize downtown Tampa. Many of them have focused on areas where local artists and artist groups had already gained a foothold and began to build their own communities. These flowering locations, such as Ybor City, simultaneously became attractive to developers. In effect, most of the growing art community was indirectly pushed out by rent hikes and real estate developments.

In 1996, The Florida Center for Contemporary Art (FCCA), a not-for-profit organization that once called Ybor City its home, was struggling to reinvent itself in Downtown Tampa. The FCCA began by renting a space on the far north side of Franklin St. where it floundered under the debt it accumulated when trying to survive in its Ybor City location. Despite the situation, they started to recover when a developer offered up a free space at the old Crown Wig Shop further south on Franklin St. The FCCA then joined forces with another artist group called Titanic Anatomy, Inc. and this is when the vitality of the arts community began to be revived. Their partner, the Titanic Anatomy group, took control of the second level of the space and looked after the F.C.C.A.’s exhibition needs. This collaboration yielded a year of energetic projects that made a lasting impact on the arts community.

There were times that the organization worked with Tampa Theater to incorporate visual projects with film openings. At the end of 1998, there has been a reverse of situation when a project to revitalize the Franklin Street Mall came out. The plans to create a “farmers market” and “art flea market” from old buildings caused enough of a stir that developers pulled the plug on the arts organizations’ squatting techniques, in hopes of high dollar rental.

The efforts to breathe life into Franklin St. failed and buildings such as the Crown Wig Shop remained derelict for seven years and remain so today. The FCCA did not pursue a new venue. Titanic Anatomy, Inc. splintered off into a new group with a different mission called Experimental Skeleton, Inc. Experimental Skeleton was to have many small venues finally landing proper in Seminole Heights where Florida Ave. was quickly becoming the breeding ground for galleries, artist studios, and transplants from the old Ybor City days now making it happen again (notably places like Viva la Frida’ restaurant/gallery). Experimental Skeleton along with other arts organizations like Covivant Gallery continued to function and enrich the city and Seminole Heights neighborhood.

== Activism ==
Experimental Skeleton has a very strong activist nature. The group has weighed in on public/civic projects like gun buy back programs and was instrumental in creating the competition to create a bat house in Al Lopez Park to replace the homes of displaced bats from the old Tampa Stadium. In early 2004 Experimental Skeleton began to engage the city of Tampa in discussions on the city’s initiatives to create a "City of the Arts." The end result of the negotiations with the city and its cultural liaisons was that Experimental Skeleton would be given a space for programming exhibitions, projects and performances. This space, named Flight 19, would reside in the baggage claim building connected to the Union Station at 601 Nebraska Ave.

The vision of Flight 19 is to offer an exhibition space to serve the Tampa Bay community by promoting local art and arts organizations as well as programming important national and international art and projects. The programming will also be biased toward experimental art in keeping with the Experimental Skeleton mission. By employing these strategies the hope is that the space will organically grow into an arts “think tank” and a nucleus for creative energies in the downtown area. There will always be something exciting to see at the Flight 19 space. We will not restrict ourselves to the normal exhibition patterns or to any one discipline. We plan to show visual art, live music, performance, one night projects, lectures and even hold workshops on new/ innovative materials for students and artists. The Flight 19 space also will align itself with the city of Tampa in achieving some of its initiatives such as “Lights on Tampa”. We will actively pursue temporary or permanent public works to be sited in downtown Tampa and if possible at the Flight 19 space for public viewing.
