= Harbour Island (Tampa) =

- Neighborhood
- Location within the state of Florida
- Coordinates: 27°56′14″N 82°27′12″W
- Country: United States
- State: Florida
- County: Hillsborough
- City: Tampa
- Time zone: UTC-5 (Eastern (EST))
  - Summer (DST): UTC-4 (EDT)
- ZIP Code: 33602
- Area code: 813

Harbour Island is an island neighborhood within the city limits of Tampa, Florida and the sub-district within Downtown Tampa. The ZIP Code serving the area is 33602.

== Geography ==
Harbour Island is situated adjacent to Downtown across the Garrison Channel. Other nearby areas include Davis Islands and Channelside. The Tampa Convention Center is located directly across the Harbour Island Bridge and Channelside is just across Beneficial Drive, both walking distance.

== History ==
Harbour Island was originally known as Seddon Island, which was named after W. L. Seddon, chief engineer for the Seaboard Air Line Railway. In 1906, a public hearing was held to plan a new port for the city. Seddon's plans were adopted and soon his company dredged a channel and established a port facility on what was then called Grassy Island. The Seaboard Coast Line later sold the 177 acres (72 ha) island to the Beneficial Land Corporation in 1979 for residential, office and retail development purposes. The first phase of development did not begin until 1985. Up to that point, the island still housed a phosphate terminal and had freight rail access. Beneficial's chief executive, Finn M. W. Caspersen (1941-2009) envisioned transforming the island into a bustling waterfront with offices, shops and restaurants, much like Baltimore's Inner Harbor. Between 1985 and January 1999, Harbour Island was linked to Downtown Tampa by the Harbour Island People Mover, an automated rubber tired tram manufactured by Otis Transportation Systems that ran on an elevated concrete guideway connecting the Knights Point shopping center on Harbour Island, to the Ft Brooke Parking Garage half of a mile to the north, adjacent to the downtown core on the mainland.

== The Pointe and Westin Tampa Waterside ==
The Pointe at Harbour Island
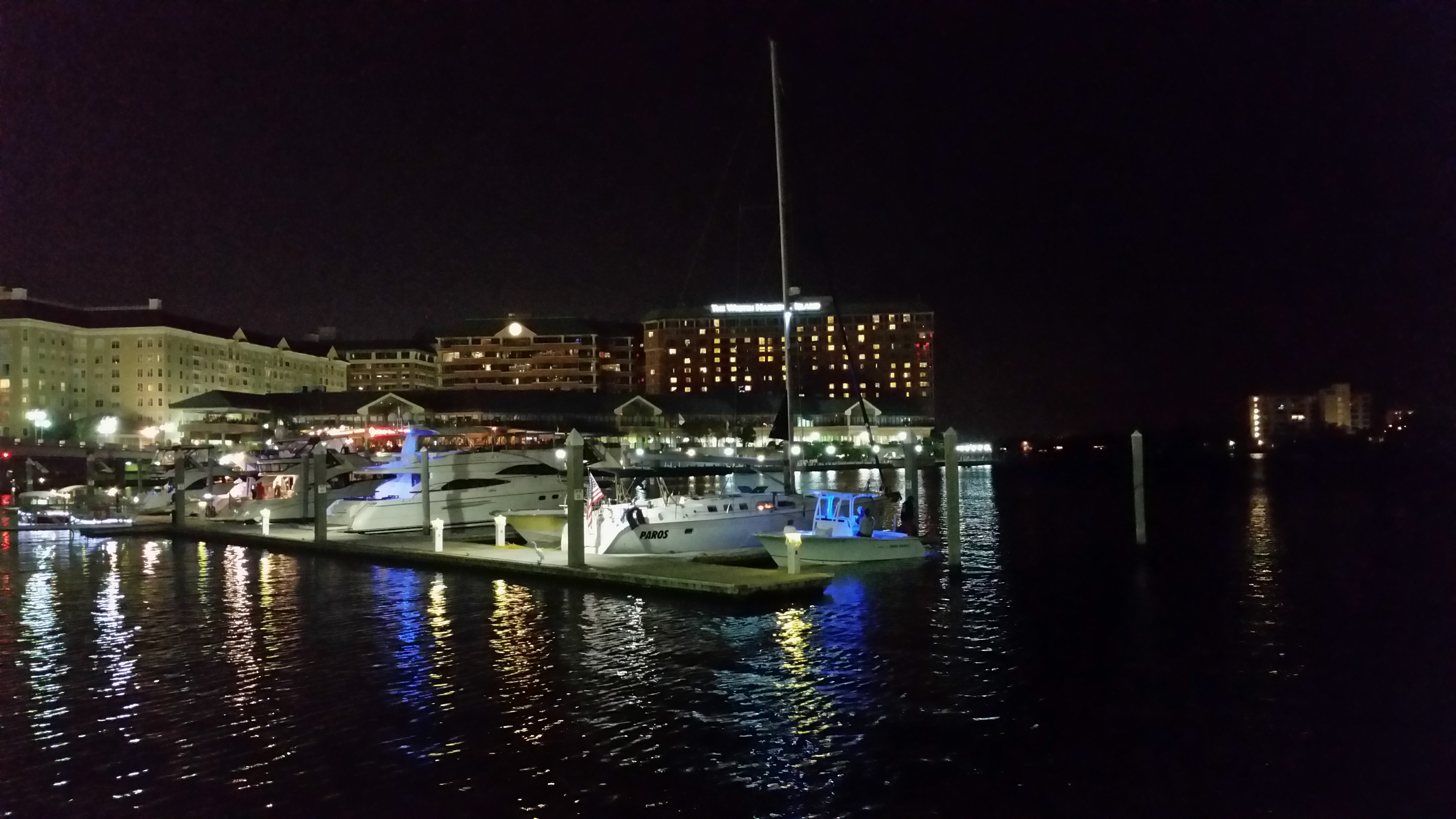
- The property at night (November 2014)
- Location: Tampa, Florida, U.S.
- Address: 601 S. Harbour Island Blvd #107, 33602
- Opened: June 23, 1985; 41 years ago (as The Shoppes); January 23, 1998; 28 years ago (as Knight's Point) 2014; 12 years ago (as The Pointe)
- Renovated: 1998; 2014
- Closed: July 1, 1995; 31 years ago (as The Shoppes)
- Previous names: The Shoppes at Harbour Island (1985–1998); Knight's Point (1998–2014)
- Developer: Beneficial Corporation
- Manager: CBRE Group
- Owner: CBRE Group
- Floors: 2
- Building details

General information
- Status: Operational (defunct as a festival marketplace)
- Type: Festival marketplace (1985–1995); Retail and office (1998–2014); Mixed-use (2014–present)

Renovating team
- Renovating firm: Convergent Capital Partners

Westin Tampa Downtown Waterside
- Former names: Wyndham Harbour Island (1987–2017)

General information
- Status: Completed
- Location: Tampa, Florida, U.S., 725 S. Harbour Island Blvd, 33602
- Named for: Marriott International
- Opened: 1987
- Renovated: 2017
- Owner: Rockpoint and Newbond Holdings
- Operator: Rockpoint and Newbond Holdings

Technical details
- Floor count: 12

Design and construction
- Developer: Beneficial Corporation

Other information
- Number of rooms: 300

The Pointe at Harbour Island is a premier waterfront commercial and residential destination in Harbour Island. It was formerly an office and retail complex known as Knight's Point since 1998 and a festival marketplace known as The Shoppes at Harbour Island since 1985. It also includes a hotel known as Westin Tampa Waterside (formerly Wyndham Harbour Island).

=== 1985–1990: Grand opening and early years ===
The Shoppes at Harbour Island officially opened on June 23, 1985. The grand opening featured former President Gerald R. Ford as a guest speaker and attracted an estimated 100,000 to 250,000 visitors to the island. The Shoppes was developed by Beneficial Corporation through its subsidiary, Harbour Island, Inc., in a similar design that mimicked the Harborplace pavilions, aiming to revitalize Harbour Island into a tourist attraction.

The Shoppes also included a 300-room hotel known as Wyndham Harbour Island, an office building, and the Harbour Island People Mover, an automated shuttle connecting the island to downtown's Fort Brooke parking garage.

The 66,000 to 100,000-square-foot retail center featured boutique shops, specialty gift stores, and high-end restaurants. Scruples was a specialty gift shop, Coffee Boutique was a precursor to the modern coffee shop craze, and Columbia Restaurant & Cha Cha Coconuts was popular local dining staples that remained long after other shops left. Specialty stores included a Franklin's Kite store, a high-end stuffed animal shop, and various fashion boutiques.

=== 1990–1998: Decline and closure ===
The Shoppes did not last long. The People Mover suffered from low ridership and high operating costs, and later closed.

City officials noted that The Shoppes at Harbour Island was clearly suffering a problem. Specifically, they noted that the mall was not yet operating "up to potential" in 1990.

That same year, Beneficial Corporation hired James W. Rouse, the visionary behind the festival marketplace model The Shoppes used, and his Enterprise Development Company (EDC) as manager to help "re-concept" and redevelop the failing center, with The Rouse Company, through its subsidiary, Rouse-Tampa, Inc. acting as licensor and consultant.

By 1991, the retail center was already foundering due to high rents and a "niche" tenant mix that failed to attract consistent traffic beyond the lunch hour. High office vacancy rates in Tampa and lower-than-expected residential sales on the island further contributed to the mall's decline. Despite the EDC's efforts to redevelop the struggling marketplace, none of its renovations have stopped the decline.

Following The Shoppes' failure as a specialty marketplace, James Rouse returned the mall to Beneficial Corp., which then began notifying the remaining retailers they had to vacate by July 1, 1995 in May.

The Shoppes officially closed its doors in the summer of 1995. Beneficial Corp. began converting the defunct marketplace into office on the second floor and new retail. The facility reopened in April 1998 as Knight's Point.

=== Redevelopment as The Pointe ===
In 2014, Knight's Point was sold to Convergent Capital Partners for $7.5 million and rebranded "The Pointe".

Convergent then announced plans to invest $10 million to upgrade the property's common areas, expand the number of boat slips from 20 to 44 and bring in more high-end retail and dining options, learning from past mistakes that made the original Shoppes a failure.

The facility's landmark restaurant, Jackson's Bistro Bar & Sushi, was preserved. Convergent has kept their promise of redevelopment by adding American Social Bar and Kitchen and Starbucks Coffee, which was also downtown Tampa's second Starbucks. American Social Bar also opened, which is a 9,000-square-foot restaurant featuring a 5,000-square-foot bayfront patio offering a high-end look with food served at reasonable price points, created 177 new staffing positions.

The new development also includes The Pointe Marina at Harbour Island, a premier docking experience with a range of boat slips, supporting the needs of reliable docking and storage.

Wyndham Harbour Island was rebranded to The Westin Tampa Waterside, which completed a $20 million renovation that refreshed guest rooms, the lobby, and meeting spaces.

As of 2026, The Pointe is owned and managed by CBRE. The hotel is operated by Rockpoint and Newbond Holdings, which acquired it from Jones Lang LaSalle (JLL). The previous owner before JLL was a Chicago-based firm known as Walton Street Capital.

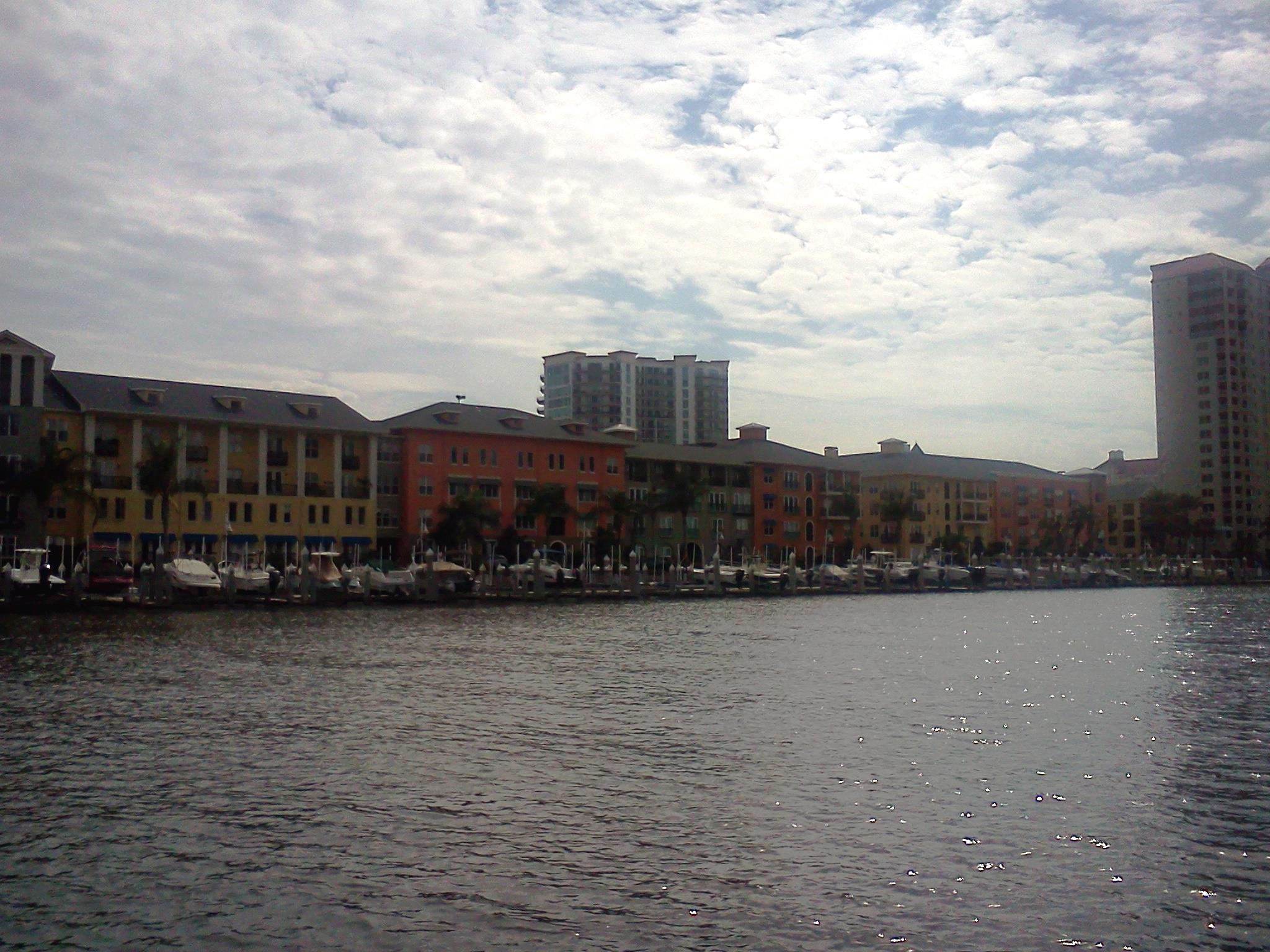
Harbour Island

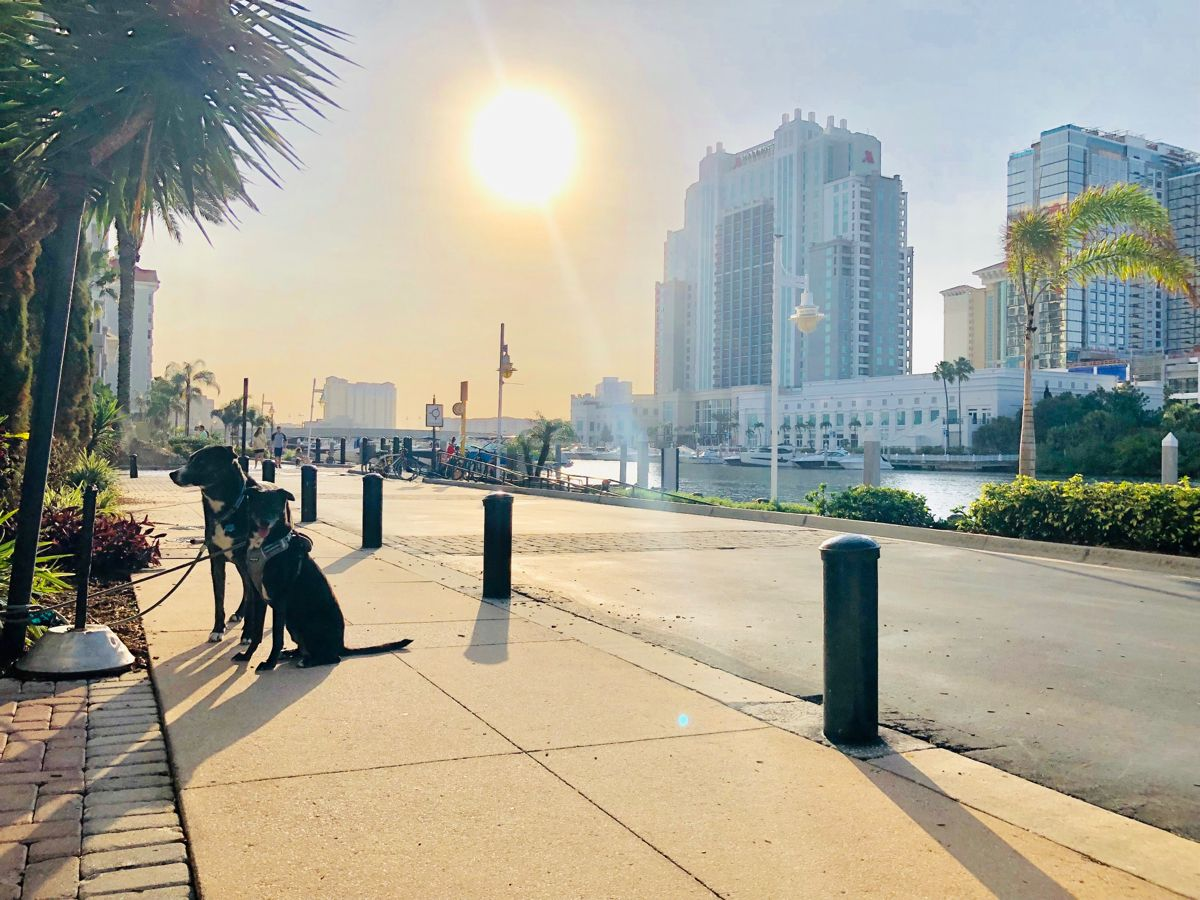
Channelside Walk Way along the Garrison Channel on Harbour Island

== See also ==
- Bayshore Boulevard
- Neighborhoods in Tampa, Florida
