= Fort Brooke =

Human settlement in Florida, United States of America

Coordinates: 27.941147°N 82.454887°W

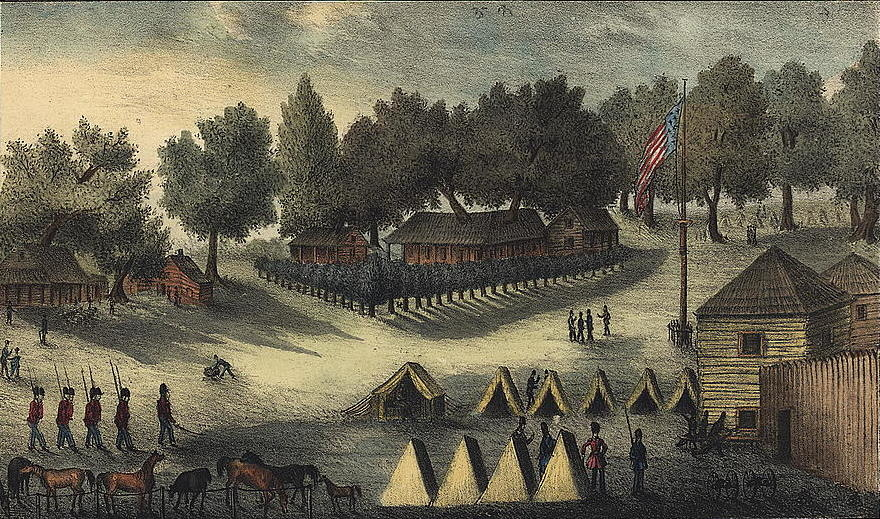
Fort Brooke around 1840

Fort Brooke was a historical military post established at the mouth of the Hillsborough River in present-day Tampa, Florida, in 1824. Its original purpose was to serve as a check on and trading post for the native Seminoles, who had been confined to an interior reservation by the Treaty of Moultrie Creek (1823), and it served as a military headquarters and port during the Second Seminole War (1835–1842). The village of Tampa developed just north of the fort during this period, and the area was the site of a minor raid and skirmish during the American Civil War. The obsolete outpost was sparsely garrisoned after the war, and it was decommissioned in 1883, just before Tampa began a period of rapid growth, opening the land for development.

Fort Brooke was located on what is now the southern end of downtown Tampa along eastern bank of the river and the Garrison Channel. Most of the fort's structures were situated at the current site of the Tampa Convention Center, with the military reserve stretching from the current location of the Tampa Bay History Center to the southeast to Curtis Hixon Waterfront Park to the northwest, with many modern buildings and public spaces (including Benchmark International Arena and much of the Tampa Riverwalk now located in its former footprint. Several unmapped army and Seminole cemeteries along with many artifacts were discovered during various construction projects. The soldiers' remains were reinterred at the Florida National Cemetery in Bushnell, the native remains were transferred to the Seminole Tribe of Florida, and the artifacts were given to the Tampa Bay History Center and other institutions for research and preservation.

== Fort Brooke as a military outpost ==
In 1823, Colonels George Mercer Brooke and James Gadsden of the United States Army were ordered to establish a military presence on Tampa Bay in the newly acquired Florida Territory to contain the Seminole Indians according to the Treaty of Moultrie Creek and to curtail illegal activities along the Gulf coast. On 10 January 1824, Brooke and four full companies of the U.S. 4th Infantry Regiment from Pensacola established "Cantonment Brooke" at the mouth of the Hillsborough River, just about where today's Tampa Convention Center sits in downtown Tampa. The site was marked by a huge hickory tree atop an ancient Indian mound, most likely built by the Tocobaga culture centuries before. Brooke directed his troops to clear the area for the construction of a wooden log fort and support buildings, but he ordered that several ancient live oak trees inside the encampment be spared to provide shade and cheer. In 1824, the post was officially rechristened Fort Brooke.

Fort Brooke served as a major outpost on Florida's west coast during all three Seminole Indian Wars and the Civil War. The fort also played a part in the development of the village of Tampa. In October 1863, the small Civil War Battle of Fort Brooke was fought nearby. On May 6, 1864, both Fort Brooke and Tampa were captured by Union forces. As Tampa languished during the 1870s and early 1880s, so did Fort Brooke. The last roll call of soldiers occurred in 1882, and the post was decommissioned by the U.S. Army in 1883.

== Closure and as incorporated town ==
After the fort's closure, most of the land was open to homesteaders, and some garrison buildings remained on site. Shortly after the post was decommissioned, Fort Brooke became an independent incorporated town in 1885. Fort Brooke was annexed by Tampa in 1907.

== See also ==
Tampa-Fort Brooke, a single census unit recorded by the U.S. Census Bureau in 1850.
