= Lamar Sparkman =

American cartoonist

Lamar Sparkman (July 11, 1921 – January 6, 2010) was an American cartoonist. He worked for the Tampa Tribune and created Bucco Bruce for the then new Tampa Bay Buccaneers.

== Early life and education ==
Sparkman was a third generation Tampa native and attended Plant High School. He attended the University of Florida and served in the Army before becoming a sports cartoonist at the Tampa Times.

== Career ==
Sparkman worked for the Tampa Bay Times and Tampa Tribune during his career. He designed the first logo for the Tampa Bay Buccaneers, Bucco Bruce.

Sparkman did football cartoon depicting the Florida Gators and Florida State Seminoles. He later worked for the Tampa Tribune until 1987 when he retired to focus on his paintings.

His swashbuckling pirate design for the Bucs was dropped in 1997.

He has painted various professional athletes and golf courses. His paintings have adorned the walls of Augusta National and the cover of its menu. In 2010 his family donated more than 200 of his drawings to the Tampa Bay History Center. In 2011, his work was displayed as part of an exhibit on sports history at the museum. In 1980, 30 of his portraits were displayed at the Moorehead Planetarium.

== Personal life ==
Sparkman was married to Gloria and they had two daughters. He lived at the Canterbury Tower on Bayshore Boulevard in Tampa and had a weekend house in Boca Grande. In 1960 he had a brain aneurism, he lost his left eye in 1987 to cancerous melanoma, he had a quadruple bypass in 2001, and he had a stroke and partial paralysis in October 2001.

== Publishings ==
- The Cartoon World of Lamar Sparkman His 40 Year History of Sports 1947-1987
- The Gasparilla Cookbook: the junior league, illustrator

== See also ==
- Hugh Culverhouse, owner of the Bucs who commissioned his work for the team
