= Channel District =

- Neighborhood
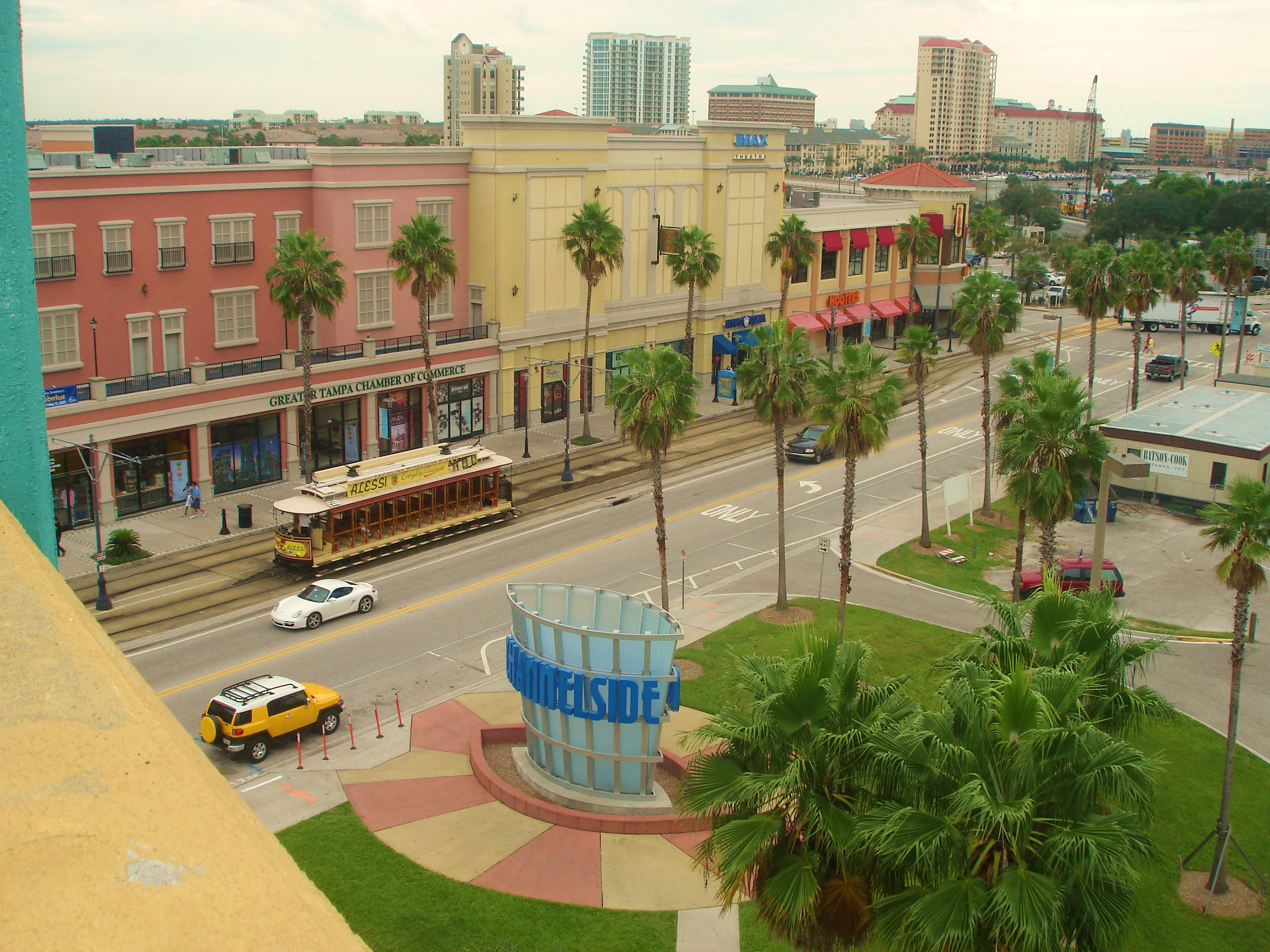
- Overlooking Channelside Drive from the parking garage. Foreground: Channelside Bay Plaza Background: Harbour Island skyline

- Location within Florida
- Coordinates: 27.9476089°N 82.4438019°W
- Country: United States
- State: Florida

Channel District is a residential neighborhood in the City of Tampa that includes an entertainment complex, just east of Downtown Tampa, Florida. It also houses a Sony Giant Screen theater. The TECO Streetcar has several stops in the district. Also, NEVs are being utilized by startups to link Tampa's core neighborhoods including Channelside. The Tampa Convention Center is located adjacent to the district to the west.

Several official Super Bowl XLIII parties featuring celebrity appearances were held in the district.

== History ==
Twin 30-story upscale condos Towers of Channelside were completed in 2007, with many other mid and high-rises completed since. Saint Leo University opened an adult continuing education center, called the Tampa Education Center, in the Channel District in July 2011. The Channel District also includes the Small Business Development Center at the University of South Florida.

Starting in 2010 the Tampa Attractions Association formed a tradition of coloring the Garrison Channel green for Saint Patrick's Day.

Sparkman Wharf is a recent addition to the Channel side area in 2018. This outdoor food hall is located on the waterfront. The Sparkman Wharf has options for food, drink, and outdoor seating.

== Geography ==
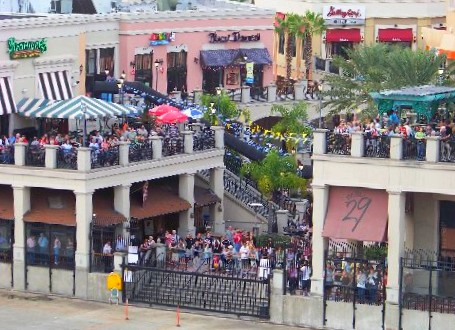
A Crowd at the Channelside Complex

It is bordered by Ybor Channel on the east and Garrison Channel on the south. Channelside is a nickname for the entertainment complex Channelside Bay Plaza, within the neighborhood that includes shops, restaurants, and bars.

Also located in the district is the Benchmark International Arena (formerly the Amalie Arena) where the NHL's Tampa Bay Lightning play their home games. The Arena also hosts concerts and other events. The center of the Bay Plaza has a large open court for live music, with views of the downtown skyline, cruise ships and the Port of Tampa.

More shopping and entertainment is planned for the area along with an urban sports park, to be named Madison Park. The side streets away from the bay plaza are becoming the focal points of the neighborhood, featuring many new restaurants, bars, and coffee shops.

== Arts and culture ==
=== American Victory Museum ===
The American Victory Museum is located on the south end of the Channel District.

=== Florida Aquarium ===
The Florida Aquarium is located on the south end of the Channel District. It is the 8th largest aquarium in the United States and in 2023, reached one million annual visitors.

=== Tampa Bay History Center ===
The Tampa Bay History Center is located on the south end of the Channel District.
