= Garrison Channel =

Coordinates: 27.941133°N 82.450298°W

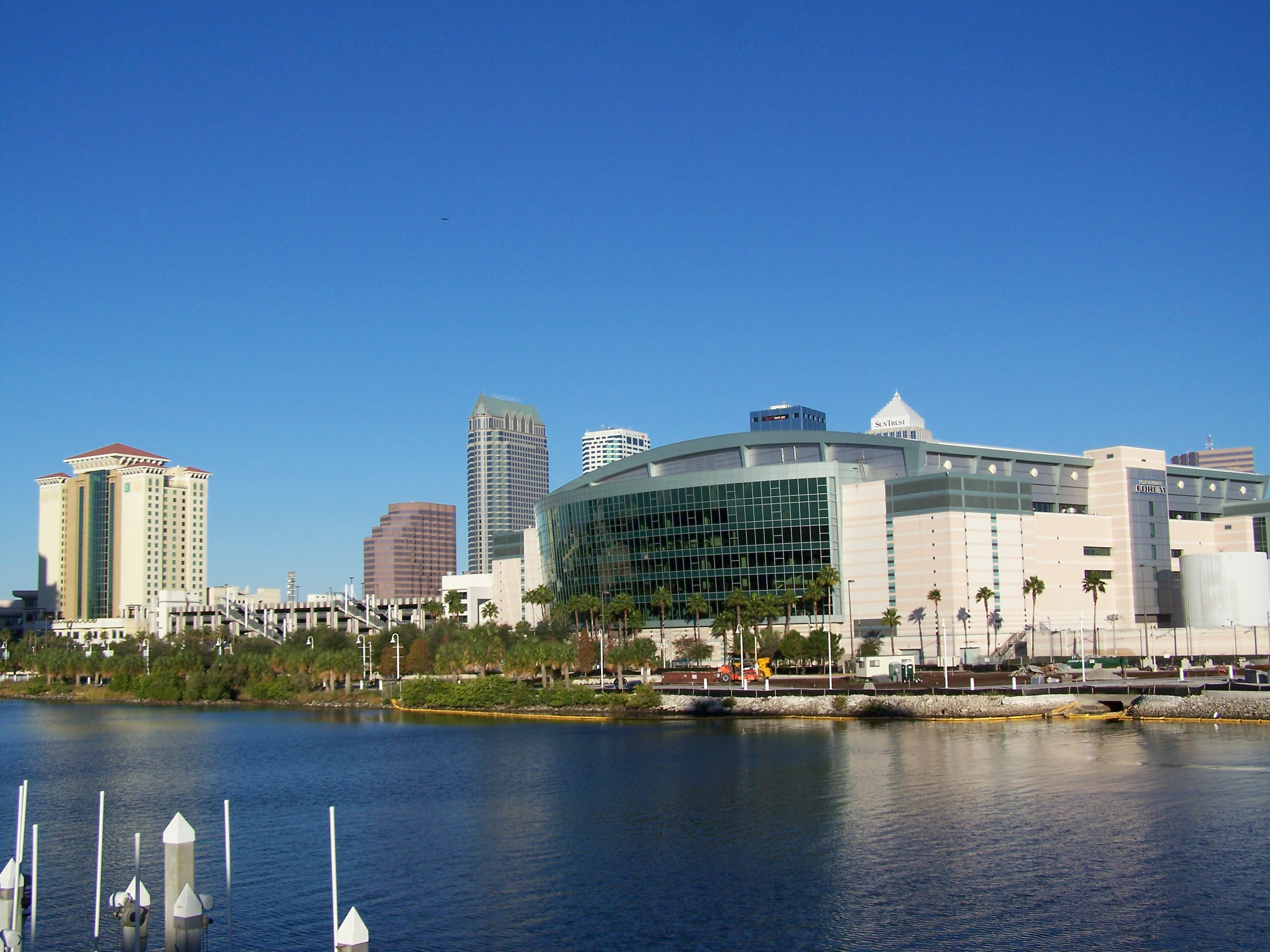
The Garrison Channel with the Benchmark International Arena

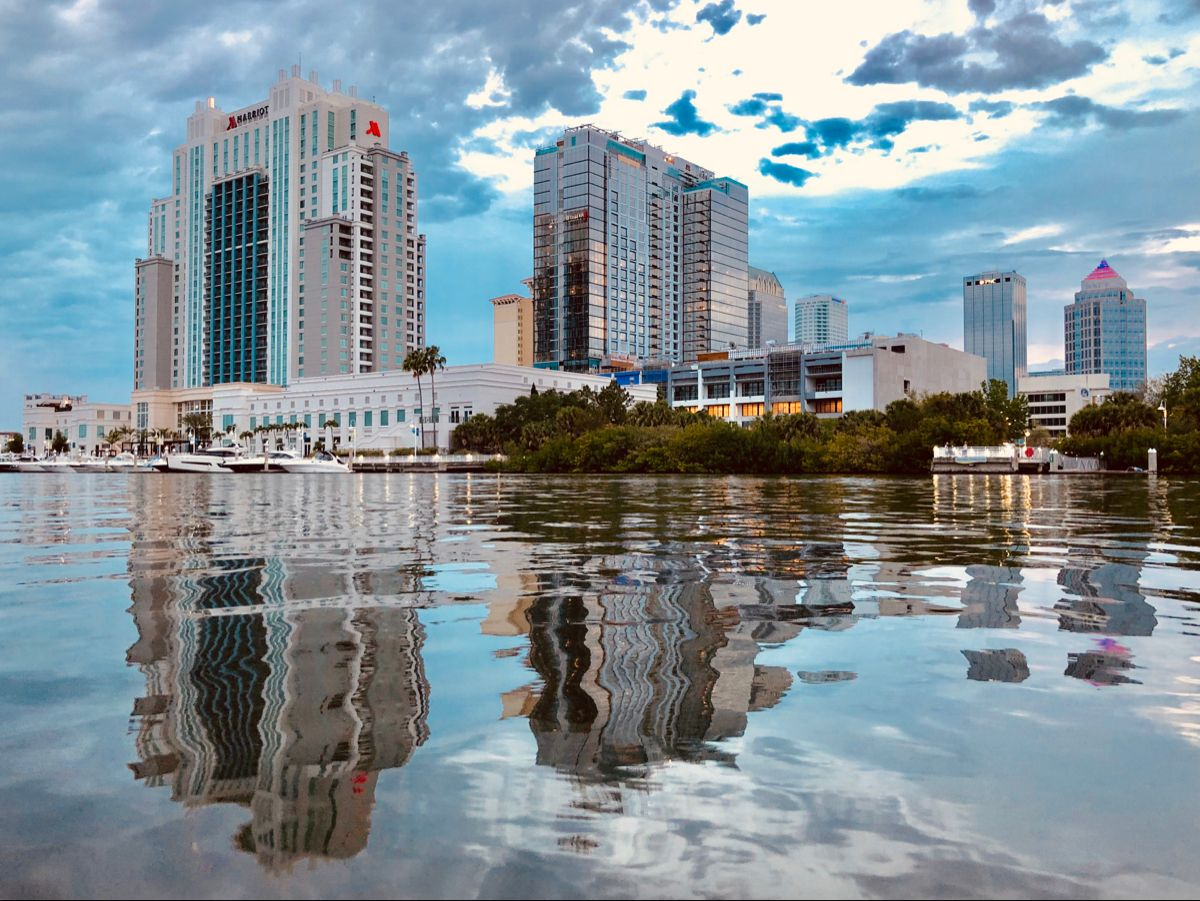
A view of Garrison Channel from Harbour Island.

The Garrison Channel is one of several channels for boat traffic in and around the Port of Tampa in the City of Tampa, Florida. The Garrison Channel is anchored by the Channelside District on the East, leads to the Ybor and Sparkman Channel and by the Tampa Convention Center on its westside. It also leads itself to the Hillsborough River. The Garrison Channel is where the Waterside Marriott and Benchmark International Arena are located on the north bank, and Harbour Island is located at the south end of the Garrison Channel.

The Garrison Channel was formerly known as the Hendry and Knight Channel, and was originally a private enterprise. In 1910 the Channel was further improved by the U.S Army Corps of Engineers and publicly acquired.

The 60,000-square-foot (5,600 m^{2}) Tampa Bay History Center opened on the banks of the Garrison Channel in 2009. There are several restaurants along the channel with docking facilities for mariners.

== See also ==
- Ybor Channel, Tampa is separated from the Garrison Channel by the Beneficial Drive bridge
