= Straz Center for the Performing Arts =

Arts center in Tampa, Florida, US

- Tampa Bay Performing Arts Center
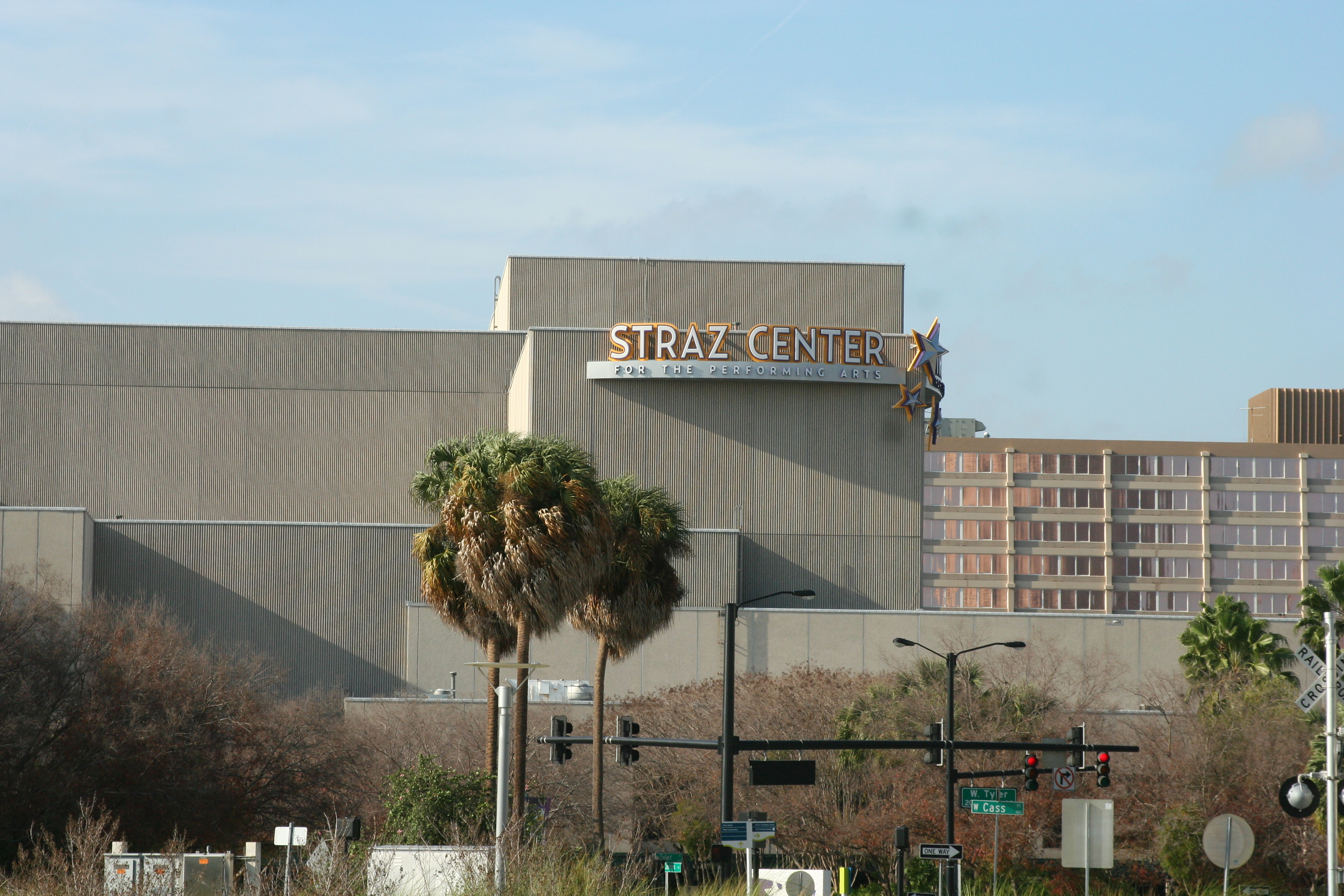
- Interactive map of Straz Center for the Performing Arts
- Address: 1010 North W.C. MacInnes Place; Tampa, Florida; U.S.
- Coordinates: 27.9515°N 82.4639°W
- Capacity: Carol Morsani Hall: 2,610; Ferguson Hall: 1,042; Jaeb Theater: 268; Shimberg Playhouse: 130; TECO Theater: as needed
- Type: Performing arts center

Construction
- Opened: July 1987

Website
- www.strazcenter.org

The Straz Center for the Performing Arts is a performing arts venue in Tampa, Florida, United States. It opened in July 1987 at a cost of $57 million as the Tampa Bay Performing Arts Center. It was renamed in 2009. The Straz Center is owned by the City of Tampa and operated by the David A. Straz Jr. Center for the Performing Arts, Inc., a not-for-profit corporation.

The Straz Center is located downtown on a 9-acre (36,000 m^{2}) site along the east bank of the Hillsborough River. As the second largest performing arts complex in the Southeastern United States (behind the Adrienne Arsht Center for the Performing Arts), the 335,000-square-foot (31,100 m^{2}) venue provides an environment for a variety of events. It has a leading Broadway series and produces grand opera, as well as concerts, performances and events. The center estimates that it has a statewide economic impact of $100 million annually, generates 100,000 hotel room nights a year, and has 110 full-time and 250 part-time employees. Attendance runs on average 600,000 guests per year. In 2009, the Straz Center officially began a new program entitled the "Broadway Genesis Project," which presents premieres of musicals and plays that might move to Broadway. In 2018 the Straz Center went under an extensive multi-million dollar renovation that included new wood floors on the stages, new cooler LED lighting, and improved dressing rooms for performers. Judith Lisi was the chief executive officer for 30 years through September 2022. Greg Holland took over as president and CEO in October 2022.

The center is named for David A. Straz Jr. (1942 - 2019), a Tampa banker and philanthropist. He ran a losing campaign for mayor of Tampa in 2019.

== Venues and facilities ==
The performing arts complex consists of five distinct theaters, a rehearsal hall, retail shops, on-site restaurants and banquet facilities. The five individual theaters are Carol Morsani Hall (2,600+ seats), Ferguson Hall (1,042 seats), the Jaeb Theater (292 seats), the TECO Energy Foundation Theater (250 seats) and the Shimberg Playhouse (130 seats).

With the Patel Conservatory, the Straz Center has added 45,000 square feet (4,200 m^{2}) for its extensive education programs. The Conservatory features 20 studios, including two dance studios with sprung floors, a sound/lighting laboratory, technical theater workshop, rehearsal hall, costume shop, isolation/sound booth, black box theater and media arts/TV studio. During 2007/2008 the Conservatory served nearly 60,000 students with 2,948 classes, workshops and performances. In 2017, the Conservatory delivers outreach arts education services to 45 partnering schools and agencies in four counties.

=== Carol Morsani Hall ===
The centerpiece of the complex which seats over 2,600. The hall's proscenium is 60 feet (18 m) high with a playing depth of 55 feet (17 m) and a total stage width of 120 feet (37 m). When combined with an 11-story high backstage area, the Carol Morsani Hall onstage and backstage areas easily accommodate major productions of Broadway musicals, presentations by Opera Tampa, ballets and multi-genre concerts. A 42-ton concert wall can be lowered for the orchestra and choral performances. The traditional horseshoe-shaped auditorium has continental seating on four levels: orchestra, mezzanine, balcony and gallery. Excellent sightlines combine with acoustics. The hall is named for Carol Morsani, who, along with her husband, Frank Morsani, is a noted Tampa philanthropist.

=== Ferguson Hall ===
Suited for plays, pop concerts and dance events, with a 40-foot (12 m) wide by 30-foot (9.1 m) high proscenium, a total playing depth of 50 feet (15 m) and a total stage width of 80 feet (24 m), plus orchestra pit and concert wall. This hall was named for Center benefactor Louise Saberton Lykes Ferguson. The wife of attorney Chester Ferguson, she died in 2016.

=== Jaeb Theater ===
The 292-seat Robert and Lorena Jaeb Theater is named for the Jaebs, whose gift to the Capitol Fund Drive in 1985 helped establish the endowment fund for the Tampa Bay Performing Arts Center. The Jaeb Theater's stage is 40 feet (12 m) wide by 20 feet (6.1 m) deep. The audience area can be configured to stadium or cabaret seating for plays or cabaret shows, as well as recording sessions, television productions, seminars and business meetings.

=== TECO Energy Foundation Theater ===
The 3,500-square-foot (330 m^{2}) TECO Energy Foundation Theater dominates the west end of the first floor of the Patel Conservatory. The room is two stories of open space with glass walls and windows on two sides. Blackout curtains convert the rehearsal space into a performance space. There is no permanent stage and all furnishings are portable for flexibility.

=== Shimberg Playhouse ===
The 130-seat Hinks and Elaine Shimberg Playhouse is located between the Center Store and the Jaeb Theater.

== Events, resident companies and constituents ==
Annual events include the Broadway Ball, Best of Tampa Bay, Eggstravaganza, and a facility-wide Open House in the fall. The venue also is the annual host of the Broadway Theater Project and International Thespian Society’s Florida State Thespian Festival.

The center is the home to these resident companies:

- Opera Tampa
- Jobsite Theater
- Next Generation Ballet

Straz Center has housed, and continues to house, a number of constituent organizations, including:

- Patel Conservatory Youth Theater Company
- Patel Conservatory Youth Ballet
- Patel Conservatory Jazz Ensemble
- Crescendo
- The Florida Orchestra
- GMI Music
- Gulf Coast Youth Choirs
- Heralds of Harmony
- Lyric Opera Theatre
- mad Theatre of Tampa (2014-2015 Best Community Theater Company from broadwayworld.com)
- The Master Chorale of Tampa Bay
- Spanish Lyric Theater
- Tampa Bay Gay Men's Chorus
- Tampa Bay Children's Chorus
- Tampa Bay Symphony
- Tampa Oratorio Singers
- Toast of Tampa
- University of South Florida, Department of Music
