= Jobsite Theater =

Coordinates: 27.9516°N 82.4641°W

Jobsite Theater is an American professional theater company incorporated in 1999 and located in Tampa, Florida, United States. They are the resident theater company of the Straz Center for the Performing Arts (formerly Tampa Bay Performing Arts Center).

== History ==
Founded by David M. Jenkins, Michael Caban, Alan Fessenden, John Lott, and Jason Vaughan Evans using the 54-seat Silver Meteor Gallery in Ybor City as their first home, the company moved into the Off Center Theater (now the Shimberg Playhouse) as resident theater company in 2003.

== Focus ==
Jobsite produces a broad range of theater, focusing on younger and non-traditional theater attendees but attracting audiences of all ages and backgrounds to downtown Tampa. Jobsite has modeled their company, the material they produce, and their approach to theater production on companies like the Steppenwolf Theatre and the Berliner Ensemble.

Jobsite is an ensemble cast theater with actors, directors, designers, stage managers, artisans, and musicians in their membership. Per the mission statement on their website:

Jobsite is dedicated to producing socially and politically relevant theater for the broadest possible audience. We have established a collective of like-minded regional artists over 60 members strong, creating both a supportive collaborative environment and professional theatrical laboratory. Through all forms of theater – experimental, new plays, contemporary work, or the classics – and our expanding educational and community outreach, we hope to inspire our community to become not just consumers, but true citizens.
