= Tampa Convention Center =

Convention center in Tampa, Florida, United States

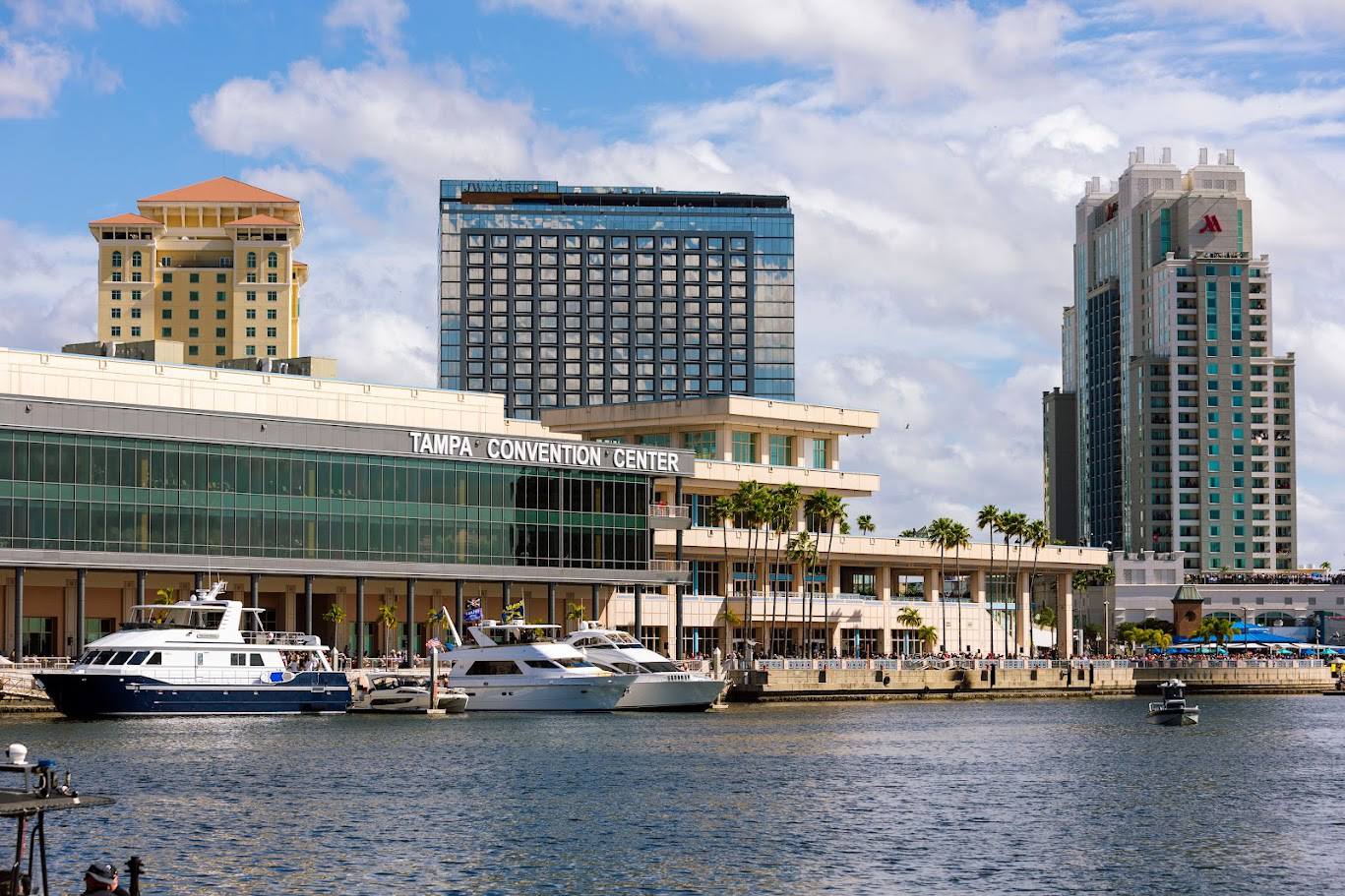
- Tampa Convention Center view from the water with boats in front and city skyline behind it
- Interactive map of Tampa Convention Center
- Address: 333 S. Franklin Street
- Location: Tampa, Florida
- Coordinates: 27.9417°N 82.4567°W
- Owner: City of Tampa
- Public transit: Dick Greco Plaza

Construction
- Built: 1989-90
- Opened: October 1990
- Construction cost: $140-million

Website
- Official website

The Tampa Convention Center is a mid-sized convention center located in downtown Tampa, Florida at the mouth of the Hillsborough River. It has both waterfront views of Tampa Bay and views of the city's skyline. Harbour Island is across the eponymous bridge on the other side of the Garrison Channel. The center is connected to the neighboring Channelside District and Ybor City via the TECO Line Streetcar, which has a station across the street. The center opened in 1990 and encompasses 600,000 square feet (56,000 m^{2}) in total. It has a 200,000 square feet (19,000 m^{2}) exhibit hall, a ballroom capable of accommodating over 2,000 guests, and 36 meeting rooms that can be adjusted to various sizes. The facility hosts over 100 events per year.

== History ==
The Tampa Convention Center is built on the historical site of Fort Brooke, the original American outpost on Tampa Bay established in 1824. The community of Tampa slowly grew around Fort Brooke through two wars with the Seminole Indians and the American Civil War. The post was decommissioned by the United States Army in 1883 and the land was sold for private use.

The former location of the fort was used for various industrial and commercial purposes until the late 1980s, when it was cleared to make way for a new convention center to replace Tampa's aging Curtis Hixon Hall. Construction began in early 1989, with the city of Tampa paying the $140 million cost by issuing municipal bonds. It opened in October 1990.

== Hotels ==
The city's original development plan called for the Tampa Convention Center to be built concurrently with a large hotel. However, financial difficulties and problems with developers caused this portion of the plan to be delayed until 2000, when the 27-story Tampa Marriott Waterside Hotel, the city's largest at the time, opened less than a block away on Garrison Channel. In 2006, more adjacent lodging was added when a 20-story Embassy Suites hotel opened directly across Franklin Street from the convention center, connecting to the convention center via a skybridge.

With the Waterstreet revitalization, a third hotel was opened in 2022, JW Marriott Waterstreet Tampa, concluding the last corner on the Convention Center square. Designed by the same architects that created Tampa Marriott Waterside Hotel, Nichols Architects, the hotel was JW Marriot's 100th property in the world, featuring 100,000 sq. ft of meeting and event space, including the largest hotel ballroom in Tampa Bay at approximately 30,000 sq. ft. In combination with its sister property, Tampa Marriott Waterside, the complex boasts over 40,000 sq. ft. of additional total event space, with both hotels connected by a glass sky bridge located on the third floor.

== Major events ==
The Tampa Convention Center was the media center for the 2012 Republican National Convention, which was held approximately two blocks away at the Tampa Bay Times Forum.

It hosts the yearly Tampa Bay Comic Con, anime convention MetroCon, as well as the Florida Bar Exam.

== See also ==
- List of convention centers in the United States
