= Tampa Theatre =

Theater in Tampa, Florida, US

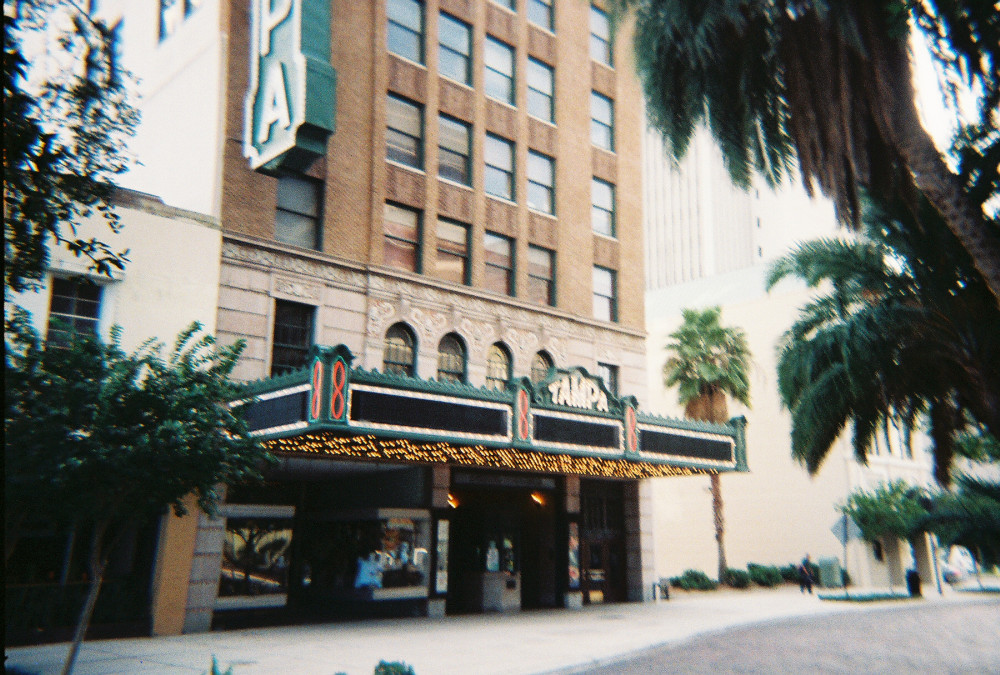
- Exterior of venue (c.2006)
- Interactive map of Tampa Theatre
- Full name: Tampa Theatre Building
- Address: 711 N Franklin St; Tampa, FL 33602-4435
- Location: Downtown Tampa
- Coordinates: 27°57′0″N 82°27′32″W
- Owner: City of Tampa
- Operator: The Arts Council of Hillsborough County
- Capacity: 1,252

Construction
- Groundbreaking: April 12, 1925
- Opened: October 15, 1926
- Renovated: 1976-77; 1992; 2009; 2011-12; 2017
- Cost: $1.2 million ($22 million in 2025 dollars)
- Architect: John Eberson

Website
- tampatheatre.org
- Tampa Theatre
- U.S. National Register of Historic Places
- Architectural style: Mediterranean Revival
- NRHP reference No.: 78000945
- Added to NRHP: January 3, 1978

The Tampa Theatre is a historic U.S. theater and city landmark in Downtown Tampa, Florida. Designed as an atmospheric theatre-style movie palace by architect John Eberson, it opened on October 15, 1926. The theatre features a wide range of independent, foreign, and documentary films. It is Tampa's only non-profit movie palace, and operating costs are supported by its members, donors, and corporate sponsors, as well as by ticket and concessions sales. The theatre is a multi-use venue, hosting over 700 events annually including live concerts, classic and first-run films, special events, theatre tours, and educational programs.

== History ==
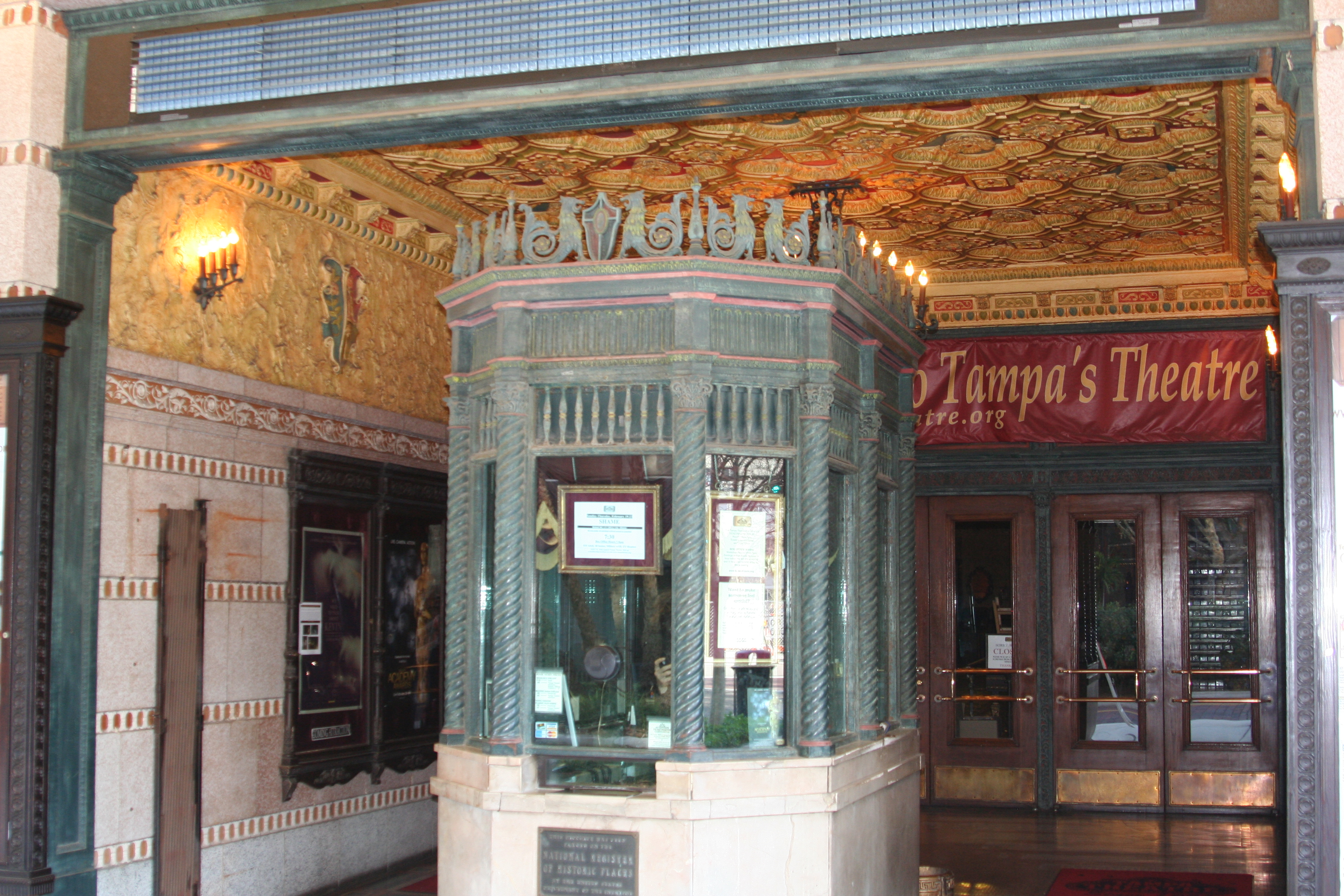
Tampa Theatre box office, 2012

Tampa Theatre was the first commercial building in Tampa to offer air conditioning. The theatre's interior resembles a romantic Mediterranean courtyard replete with old-world statuary, flowers, and gargoyles. On the ceiling is an artificial nighttime sky with stars on it.

By the 1960s and 1970s, many American movie palaces were demolished because the land beneath them became more valuable than the theatre operation.

In 1973, the theatre faced the same fate. But the citizens rallied and committees were formed. City leaders became involved, and soon a deal was reached to have the City rescue the Tampa Theatre by assuming its leases. The Arts Council of Hillsborough County agreed to program and manage the Tampa Theatre with films, concerts, and special events. By the time it reopened in early 1978, the Tampa Theatre had become something of a national model on how to save an endangered theater.

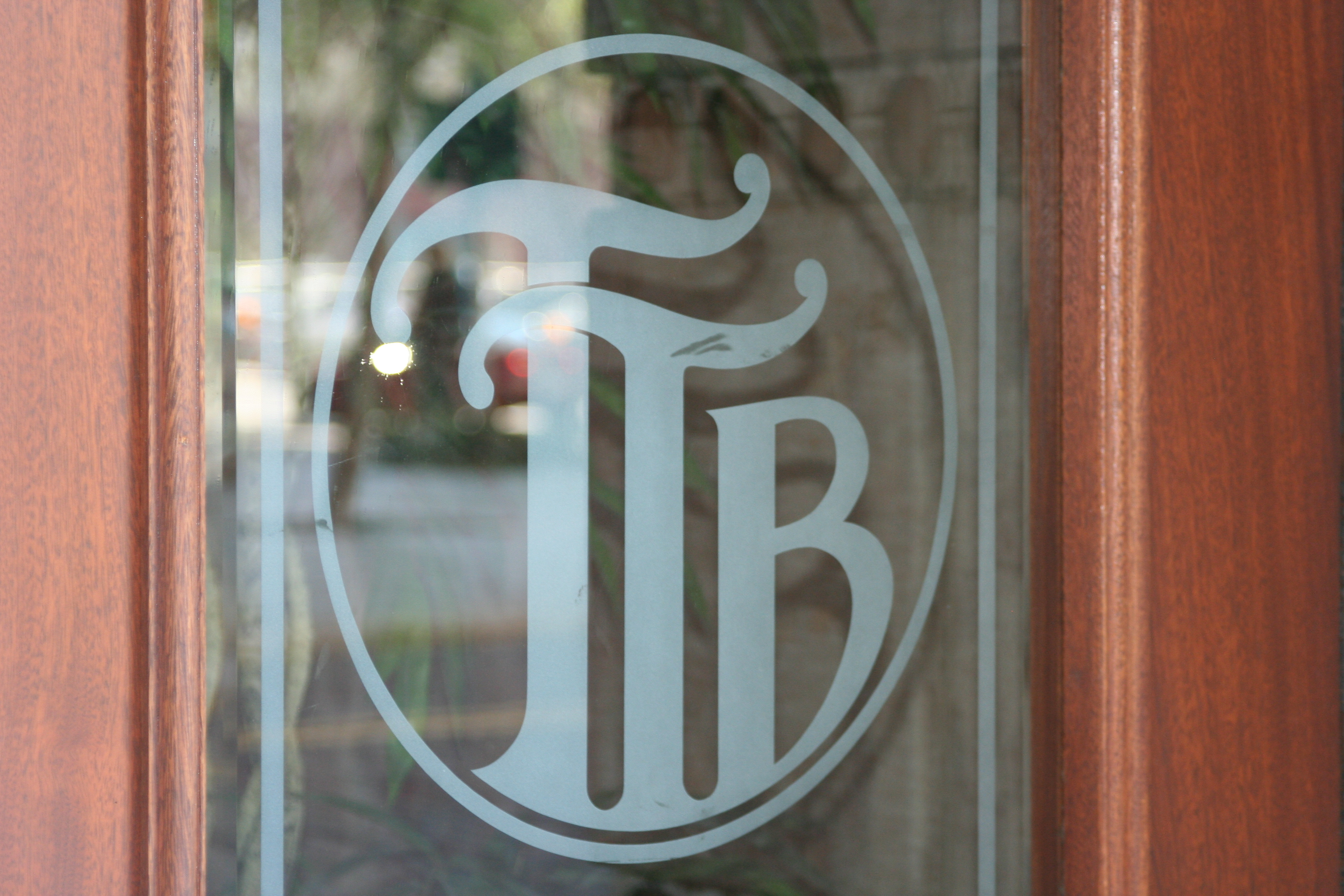
Tampa Theatre logo etched on one of its windows

In 1992, restoration efforts were led by the Tampa Theatre Foundation after the building caught fire in 1991. The theatre presents and hosts over 600 events a year including a full schedule of the first run and classic films, concerts, special events, corporate events, tours, and educational programs.

Since its rescue in 1978, the theatre has had over five million guests including over one million school children for school field trips and summer camps. It is one of Tampa's largest historic preservation projects.

It was named to the National Register of Historic Places in 1978, is a Tampa City Landmark, and is a member of the League of Historic American Theatres.

The theatre has undergone many restoration projects as well as equipment upgrades. The marquee and vertical blade sign were replaced in late 2003, and a public lighting ceremony was held on January 16, 2004. In April 2023, the City of Tampa’s Community Redevelopment Agency approved $14 million in funding for Phase II restoration work at the theatre.

The theatre operates The Mighty Wurlitzer Theatre Organ and the instrument is played before nightly films. The organ is played and maintained by a team of volunteer organists from the Central Florida Theatre Organ Society.

In the spring of 2013, during its 86th year of existence, efforts began to convert to digital picture and sound (with the exception of productions that are only available in the movie reel format) and screened a free showing of Samsara to celebrate the transition. The switch to digital occurred at a cost of $150,000.

In late 2017, the Theatre closed for six weeks to complete the first phase of its long-term restoration plan, a $6 million renovation that updated the electrical systems, re-seated the auditorium with seats designed to match the original look from 1926, added a new and expanded concessions stand and bar, installed a new emergency power system, and protected the building from storms by installing new storm rated windows and doors on the Florida Avenue side of the building. The seating capacity was reduced from 1,446 to 1,238 to improve comfort and legroom. A new carpet, designed to match the original 1926 design, was installed, as well as a new grand drape and valance for the proscenium arch also designed to match the original.

The lobby paint and plaster were restored to their original palette by crews from EverGreene Studios, in New York, including the replication of four tapestries to replace the faded and worn tapestries from 1926. The original tapestries were transferred to the Tampa Bay History Center for preservation.

== In popular culture ==
The glam metal band Sleeze Beez filmed the music video for the song "Stranger Than Paradise" at the theater.

== Noted performers ==
- Gregg Allman Band
- Tori Amos (3 times)
- Blondie
- Lindsey Buckingham
- David Byrne
- Colbie Caillat
- Ray Charles
- Harry Chapin
- Chris Cornell
- Miranda Cosgrove
- Elvis Costello
- Jamie Cullum
- Ani DiFranco
- Dr. John
- The Dresden Dolls
- Drive-By Truckers
- Steve Earle
- Jimmy Fallon
- Genesis
- Gov't Mule (3 times)
- Arlo Guthrie
- Charley Crockett
- Buddy Guy
- Emmylou Harris
- Iron Butterfly
- Joe Jackson
- Albert King
- B.B. King (9 times)
- Kris Kristofferson
- Ray LaMontagne
- Amos Lee
- John Legend
- Gordon Lightfoot
- Darlene Love
- Love and Rockets
- Shelby Lynne
- Aimee Mann
- Dave Mason
- Matisyahu
- Jessica Lea Mayfield
- Delbert McClinton
- Pat Metheny Group
- Randy Newman
- Nickel Creek
- Night Ranger (3 times)
- New Order
- Old Crow Medicine Show
- The Police
- Iggy Pop
- Postmodern Jukebox
- Psychedelic Furs
- Queensrÿche
- Ramones
- Damien Rice
- Todd Rundgren
- Leon Russell
- Joe Satriani
- Boz Scaggs
- Sister Hazel
- Phoebe Snow
- Spyro Gyra
- Tegan and Sara
- Third Eye Blind
- George Thorogood
- Wilco
- "Weird Al" Yankovic
- Warren Zevon
- Andrew Dice Clay

== Gallery ==
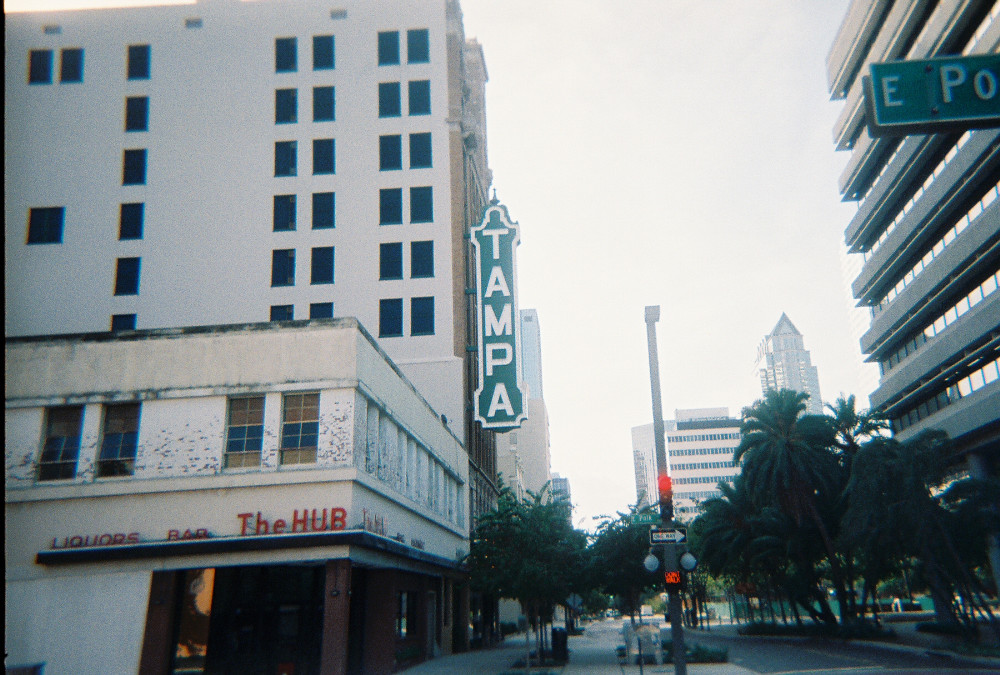

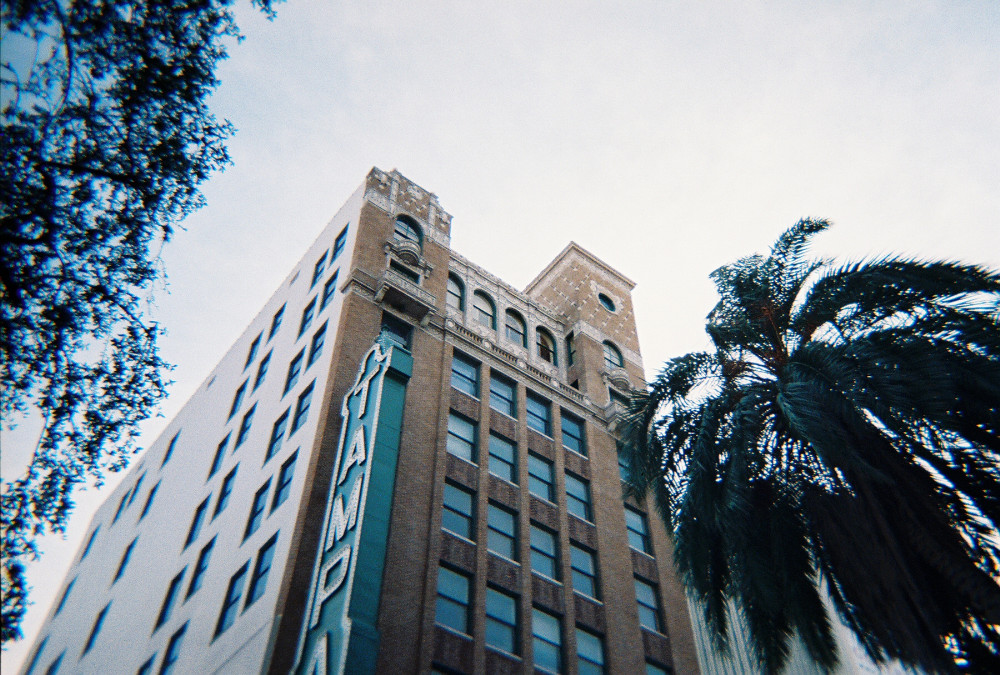

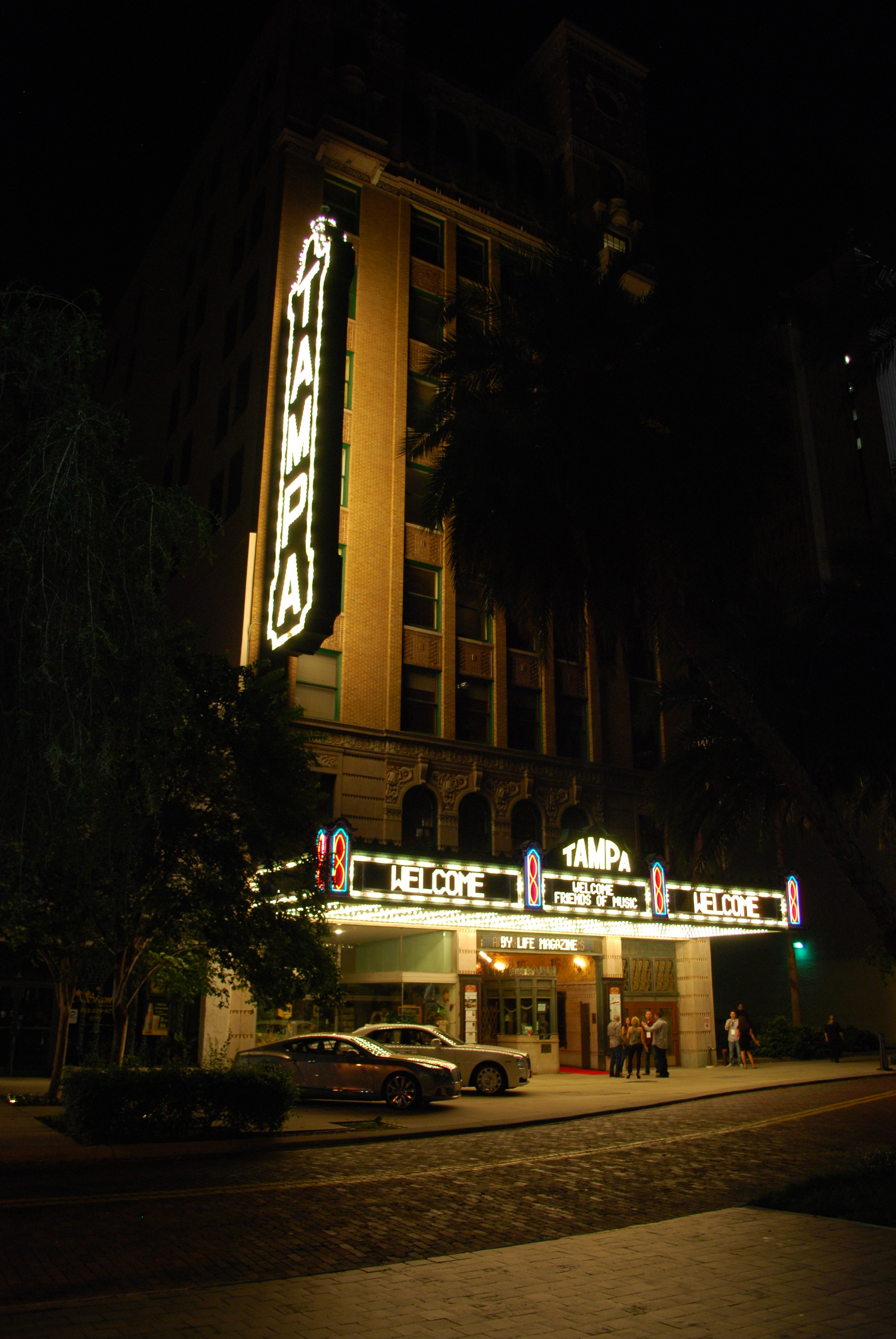

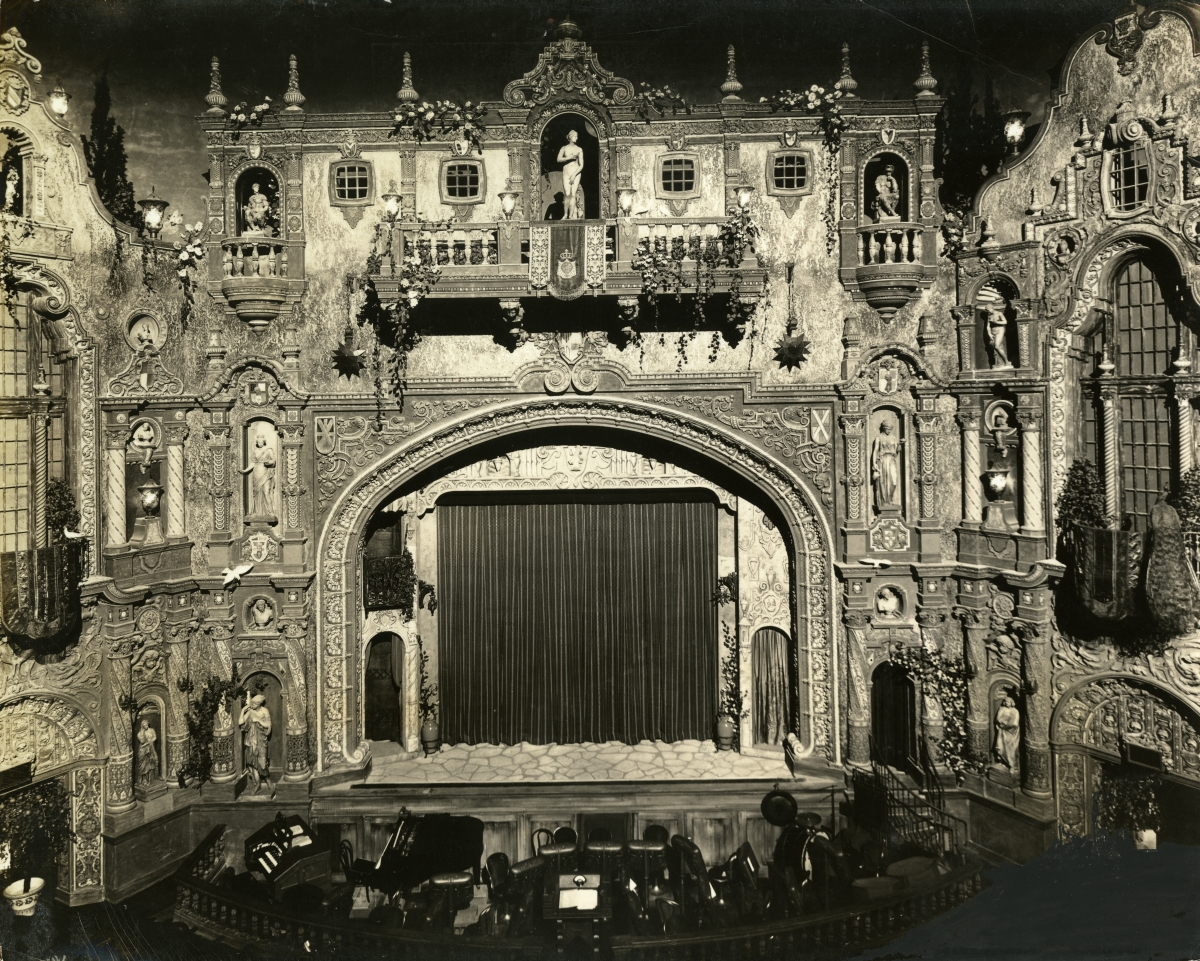
Wiew of the stage, probably around 1930s

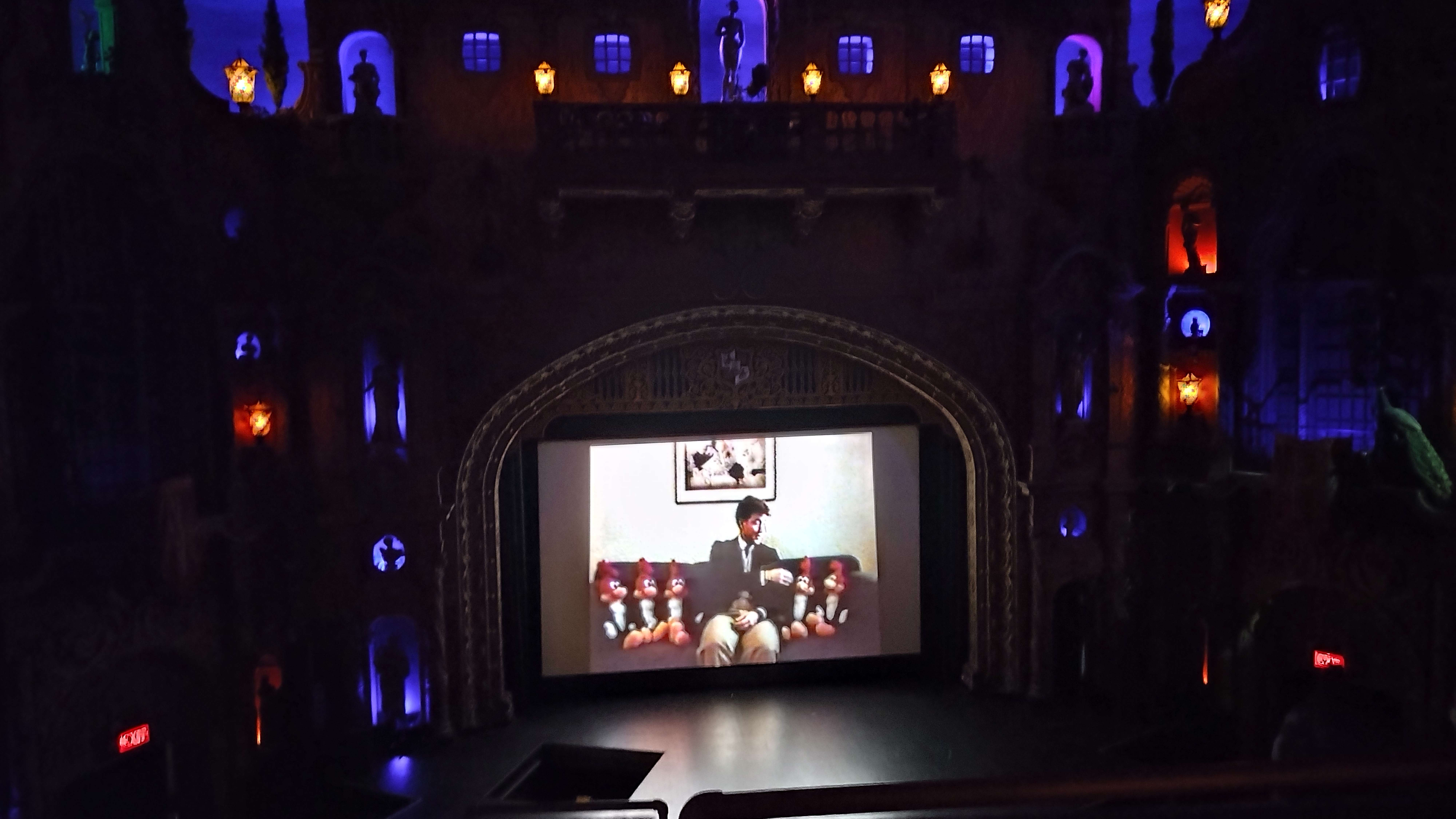

== See also ==
- National Register of Historic Places listings in Hillsborough County, Florida
