= Ybor Channel, Tampa =

Channel for boat traffic in Florida, US

Coordinates: 27°56′48″N 82°26′34″W

The Ybor Channel is one of several channels for boat traffic in and around the Port of Tampa in Tampa, Florida.

Depth in the Ybor turning basin is given as 34 feet.

The waterfront area along the channel has been home to maritime economic activity, including ships'chandlers, shipping companies, bonded warehouses and cargo operations.
