= Tampa Bay History Center =

History museum in Florida

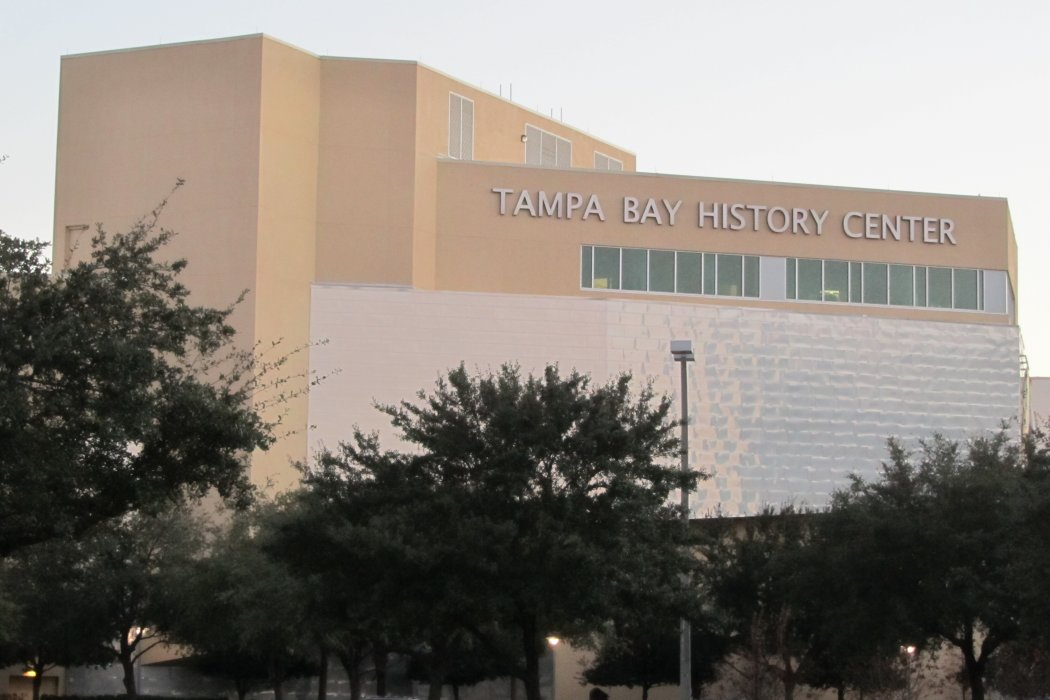
- Established: 2009
- Location: Tampa, Florida, United States
- Coordinates: 27.942702°N 82.45041°W
- Website: www.tampabayhistorycenter.org

Tampa Bay History Center is a history museum in Tampa, Florida, United States. It is a Smithsonian Affiliate and has been accredited by the American Alliance of Museums since 2015. Exhibits include coverage of the Tampa Bay area's first native inhabitants, Spanish conquistadores, and historical figures who shaped the area's history, as well as a reproduction of a 1920s cigar store. The museum is on the waterfront at 801 Water Street in Tampa's Channelside District. It opened on January 17, 2009. The History Center building is 60,000 square feet (5,600 m^{2}) with 25,000 square feet (2,300 m^{2}) of exhibit space.

The Tampa Bay History Center includes three floors of permanent and temporary exhibition space covering 12,000 years of Florida history, with a special focus on Tampa Bay and the Gulf Coast. The center has a museum store, classrooms, the Witt Research Center (a branch of the Tampa-Hillsborough County Public Library System), a map gallery, an event hall, and the Columbia Cafe (a branch of Ybor City's Columbia Restaurant).

== Timeline ==
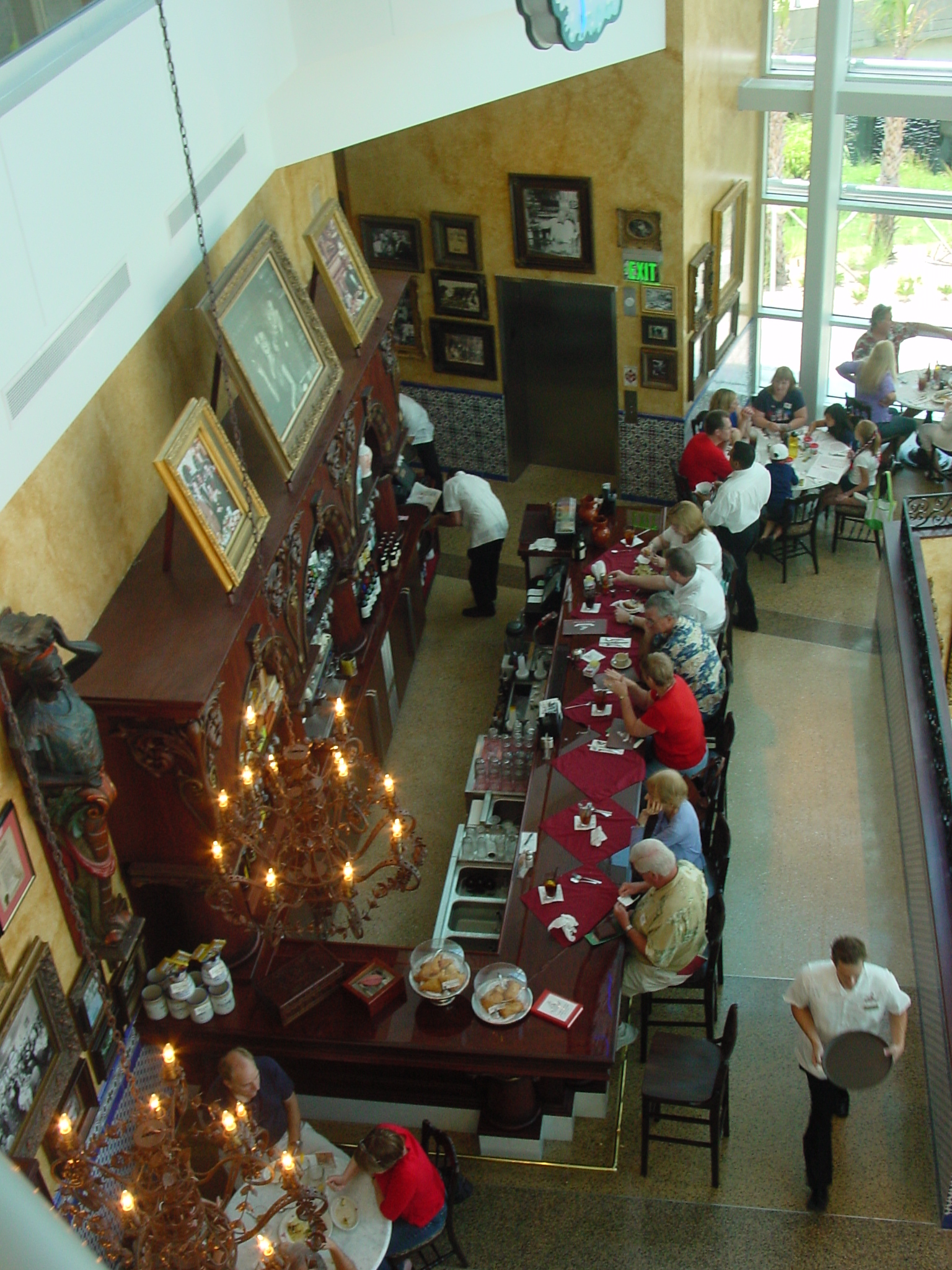
The Columbia Cafe

Hillsborough County was 14 times its present size when it was established by the Florida Territorial Legislature in 1834. Its boundaries included all or part of 24 present-day counties, stretching from Ocala to Lake Okeechobee and St. Petersburg to Orlando.

In the early 1880s, Tampa residents expressed concern that no organized effort had been made to preserve and display local artifacts. In the January 19, 1882, issue of The Sunland Tribune, County Judge J. G. Knapp wrote, "... no time should be lost in snatching the historical artifacts from the waste and death of oblivion. Who shall do it?"

Beginning about 100 years later:

- 1986: The Hillsborough County Commission assembled a taskforce to explore the feasibility of creating a regional history museum.
- 1989: The History Museum of Tampa-Hillsborough County, Inc., a 501(c) 3 not-for-profit, was established by a group of private citizens led by Tampa businessman J. Thomas Touchton. Touchton served as chairman of the board of trustees until 2000.
- 1993: A small museum space opened in the Shoppes of Harbour Island, showcasing objects from the museum's collection and other local and statewide institutions.
- 1993: The History Museum of Tampa-Hillsborough County, Inc. officially changed its name to the Tampa Bay History Center (TBHC).
- 1995: The Hillsborough County Commission charged TBHC with the care, in perpetuity, of the county collection.
- 1996: TBHC moved to the Tampa Convention Center Annex on Franklin Street, serving the community with permanent and traveling exhibitions, public programs, tours, outreach, research assistance, and publications.
- 1998: The Hillsborough County Commission committed $17 million in Community Investment tax funds toward the planning and construction of a new museum building for TBHC.
- 2000: Attorney George B. Howell III succeeded J. Thomas Touchton as chairman of TBHC's board of trustees and continued the commitment of the board, staff, members, and volunteers to acquire a permanent home for the museum.
- 2004: Tampa and Hillsborough County leaders signed an agreement to build the new history center in Cotanchobee-Fort Brooke Park on a 2.4-acre tract secured by the City of Tampa through a grant from the Florida Communities Trust.
- February 2006: To complete the process of building the new museum, the Campaign to Create the Tampa Bay History Center Experience was authorized by the board of trustees.
- September 2006: The Capital Campaign was launched, requiring the history center to raise $28 million in private funds, $17 million more than its initial pledge of $11 million to the Hillsborough County Commission. Touchton chairs the campaign.
- October 2007: Construction began on the museum's new 60,000-square-foot (5,600 m^{2}) home — Hillsborough County's first publicly owned LEED certified "Green Building".
- October 2007: Because of the success of the campaign and the need for an additional $4.5 million to build out the new museum, the board of trustees agreed to increase the private campaign goal from $28 million to $32 million.
- March 2008: TBHC closed its museum space on Franklin Street to begin staging for the move into the new building.
- June 2008: Local dignitaries, guests, board members, and staff gathered with more than 200 construction workers to celebrate the last milestone of construction — the topping-out of the Tampa Bay History Center.
- June 2008: The TBHC received word that it has been awarded a $1 million challenge grant from the prestigious Kresge Foundation to help build the museum and its exhibits. To receive the $1 million grant, the center must complete its fundraising campaign by April 1, 2009.
- January 2009: The TBHC celebrated the grand opening of its new facility.
- March 2009: The center successfully met the Kresge Challenge, raising $32 million in private contributions five days ahead of schedule.
- October 2009: The History Center Building, owned by Hillsborough County, was renamed the J. Thomas Touchton Tampa Bay History Center Building.
- 2012: The TBHC became a Smithsonian Affiliate museum.
- 2015: The center became accredited by the American Alliance of Museums.
- 2018: The TBHC opened its new Treasure Seekers exhibit about pirates, conquistadores, and shipwrecks.

== Exhibits ==
The museum's exhibition galleries explore 500 years of recorded history and 12,000 years of human habitation in the Tampa Bay region in its three floors of exhibitions.

=== Touchton Map Library ===
The Touchton Map Library, which is the only cartographic center in the Southeastern United States, is home to thousands of maps, charts, and other documents. The collection covers more than 500 years of cartography. The library partners with University of South Florida Libraries to provide the general public with access to thousands more maps. The collection is in the process of being digitized and can be viewed online.

=== Cuban Pathways ===
This exhibit is a recent addition to the Tampa Bay History Center, set to run until February 12, 2023. It details the shared history and experiences of Cuban migrants with Florida's history, the effect Cuban culture has had on Floridian culture, and the history of Cuba created by the people who lived and worked there in the past. The exhibition was presented in both English and Spanish, and covered topics from vacations to the political strife that has shaped Cuba as it is today.

=== Treasure Seekers ===
The Treasure Seekers exhibit spans much of the fourth floor of the museum, and offers patrons the ability to look at and engage with seafaring technology and practice of the past, including a section focusing on using recreations of astrolabes, devices that tracked celestial bodies to help sailors and pirates find their way on the sea. Pirates, conquistadores, and naval history are explored in this exhibit, with interactive presentations including "The Pirate's Fate Theater", immersing guests in a voyage on the sea.

=== Chinsegut Hill Historic Site ===
The museum partners with Hernando County to curate the artifacts at this site in Brooksville. It is a former plantation house and slave manor. The land was originally purchased in the 1840s by Bird Pearson, a lawyer and slave owner, who sold it to the Ederington family. The Ederingtons built the first part of the house. The home was renovated by the Robins, who renamed it Chinsegut Hill in 1904. During the Depression, the owners leased the land and manor home to the US government for $1 a year, with the stipulation that they could live in the home until their deaths. The history center's tour focuses on the stories of these families who lived at the site.

== Programs ==
Tampa Bay History Center offers docent-guided walking tours of Tampa's historic sites and neighborhoods. The tours last 90 minutes and cover about one mile. Two notable tours are Ybor City and Central Avenue East.

Tampa Bay History Center hosts a monthly book group focused on Florida literature. The event is free with registration. Florida Conversations is a free, monthly lecture series highlighting research into Florida history.

The center features several activities for youth engagement, including Summer History Adventure Camps. Teen volunteers are enlisted to work as counselors, providing a fun learning environment for kids. Teens are also recruited to serve on the Teen Council and as educational volunteers, where they assist with creating educational programming and events. Teens can gain educational assistance through AP Trivia Nights, which cover a variety of topics relevant to high school Advanced Placement courses.

The Tampa Bay History Center offers "History-to-Go" kids on Florida's First People, Florida's Seminoles, and Cigar City. These include primary sources, maps, lesson plans, and supplemental books, and are designed by educators for grades three to five.

The Tampa Bay History Center offers several kinds of field trips for students. The virtual field trips have museum staff talk via live link to students while showing exhibits, guided in-person field trips, a Central Ave, Black History walking tour, and the Chinsegut Hill Historic Site field trip.
