= Curtis Hixon Hall =

Multipurpose venue in Tampa, Florida

Coordinates: 27°56′57″N 82°27′43″W

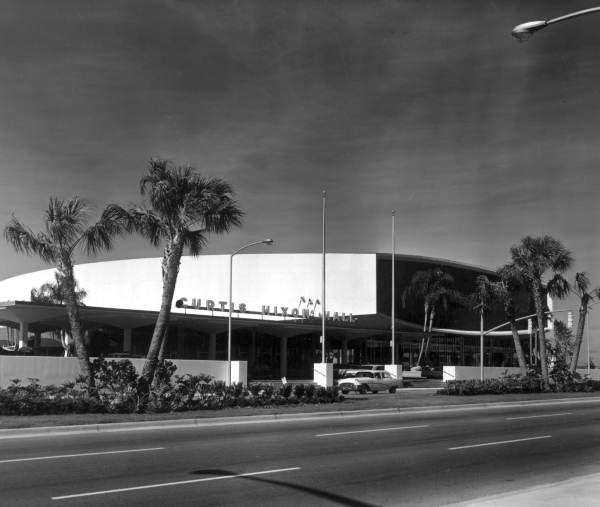
Brand-new Curtis Hixon Hall, 1965

Curtis Hixon Hall was an indoor sports arena, convention center, concert venue, and special events center which was located at 600 Ashley Drive along the Hillsborough River in downtown Tampa, Florida. Named after Curtis Hixon, a long-time Tampa mayor who died in 1956 during his fourth term in the office, it opened in 1965 and was the primary concert, indoor sports, and civic gathering place for the city for about twenty years. The construction of newer and more specialized facilities around town during the 1980s gradually reduced the number of events held at the Hall, and the opening of the much larger Tampa Convention Center in 1990 made it obsolete.

The Hall was demolished in 1993, and the land was converted into a public park. The park was redesigned and incorporated into the Tampa Riverwalk in 2010, and the facility's former footprint is now home to the Tampa Museum of Art, the Glazer Children’s Museum, and the northern portions of Curtis Hixon Waterfront Park.

== Construction ==
Curtis Hixon Hall was planned and built in the early 1960s during the administration of Tampa mayor Nick Nuccio, who pushed for the construction of many public works projects around town. It was named for Curtis Hixon, the mayor of Tampa from 1943 until he died while still in office in 1956. Local architect Norman Six designed the uniquely shaped building in a modified Googie architecture style. Construction of the 62,000 sq ft (5,800 m^{2}) facility cost approximately $5 million and was mostly financed by municipal bonds issued by the city of Tampa. It was dedicated on January 23, 1965.

== Events ==
Curtis Hixon Hall could be reconfigured and subdivided to accommodate many different events. It had a maximum capacity of about 8000 in a concert setup. It hosted concerts and sports, conventions and trade shows, large community events such as New Year's Eve dances and Gasparilla-related festivities, and political events, such as a large 1968 campaign rally for presidential candidate Richard Nixon.

=== Sports ===
Curtis Hixon Hall was the site of a wide variety of sporting events. The first event in the new facility was a boxing card held on February 15, 1965, and it hosted many subsequent boxing and wrestling cards throughout its lifetime, including a nationally televised 1971 light heavyweight championship bout between Bob Foster and Ray Anderson. Other notable fighters appearing at Curtis Hixon Hall included Earnie Shavers, Emile Griffith, José Roman, Vicente Rondón, and Maurice Watkins.

Curtis Hixon Hall also hosted many basketball games. It was the first home court of the University of South Florida's men's and women's basketball teams and the ABA's Floridians, and it was also used for high school basketball games and tournaments.

=== Music ===
Curtis Hixon Hall was Tampa's primary concert venue from the mid-1960s until the early 1980s, with only a handful of the biggest acts playing at much larger Tampa Stadium. Many of the top musical performers of the era played at Curtis Hixon Hall, including Bob Dylan (both solo and as part of the Rolling Thunder Revue),The Who, the Grateful Dead, Creedence Clearwater Revival, The Monkees, Chuck Berry, Led Zeppelin, Jefferson Airplane, Johnny Cash, Elton John, Elvis Presley, Black Sabbath, Sly & The Family Stone, The Jackson 5, Eagles, Santana, Bob Marley and The Wailers, The Beach Boys, Kiss, ZZ Top, Hank Williams Jr., The Isley Brothers, Van Halen, Tom Petty and the Heartbreakers, Rush, The Kinks, Talking Heads, Dire Straits, U2, Yes, and Stevie Ray Vaughan, among many others.

Notable shows included:

- Jimi Hendrix played Curtis Hixon Hall twice in 1968, on August 18 and November 23. In between those dates, The Jimi Hendrix Experience released their #1 charting album Electric Ladyland.
- Janis Joplin was arrested by the Tampa Police for "obscenity" while playing a show with B.B. King and others in the hall on November 16, 1969.
- Duane Allman made one of only two public performances with Eric Clapton and Derek and the Dominos in the hall on December 1, 1970.
- The Grateful Dead performed at the Hall four times. Their concert on December 19, 1973, appears in a condensed form on their 1993 live album Dick's Picks Volume 1. Their performance from the night before was later released as Dave's Picks Volume 58.
- David Bowie played the Hall during his 1974 Diamond Dogs Tour. The other stops on the tour featured very elaborate staging, backdrops, and costumes, but a truck carrying much of the scenery crashed on the way to Tampa, forcing Bowie to play a less theatrical concert that focused on the music. During his last tour, Bowie commented that the forced simplification of his 1974 Tampa show gave him the confidence to give music-centered performances later in his career.
- Elvis Presley played many sold-out shows at Curtis Hixon Hall, often performing two full concerts on the same day, a matinée and an evening show. His last concert at the venue was on September 2, 1976.
- While Patti Smith was opening for Bob Seger at the Hall on January 23, 1977, she fell off the stage and broke her neck, leading to a spinal injury and extensive physical therapy.

== Decline and demolition ==
Curtis Hixon Hall was considered small and outdated by the mid-1980s and was relegated to hosting smaller events such as small trade shows and local events such as high school graduations while most sporting events and concerts shifted to places like the USF Sun Dome (which opened in 1980) and the nearby restored Tampa Theater.

When the much larger Tampa Convention Center opened in 1990 and Tampa began making plans to build a new downtown sports arena (the future Benchmark International Arena, which opened in 1996), city leaders agreed that Curtis Hixon Hall had outlived its usefulness. Mayor Sandy Freedman's administration decided to tear down the building and replace it with Curtis Hixon Park. Demolition of the facility began in 1993 and the park was dedicated in 1995. Aquamarine-colored tiles from the hall were set into each bench at the park.

The site was redeveloped again in the late 2000s to integrate the area into the city's Riverwalk project. A new Tampa Museum of Art and the Glazer Children's Museum opened in 2010 on the footprint of Curtis Hixon Hall, while the open space immediately to the south became a redesigned Curtis Hixon Waterfront Park.
