= Blanche Armwood =

American activist

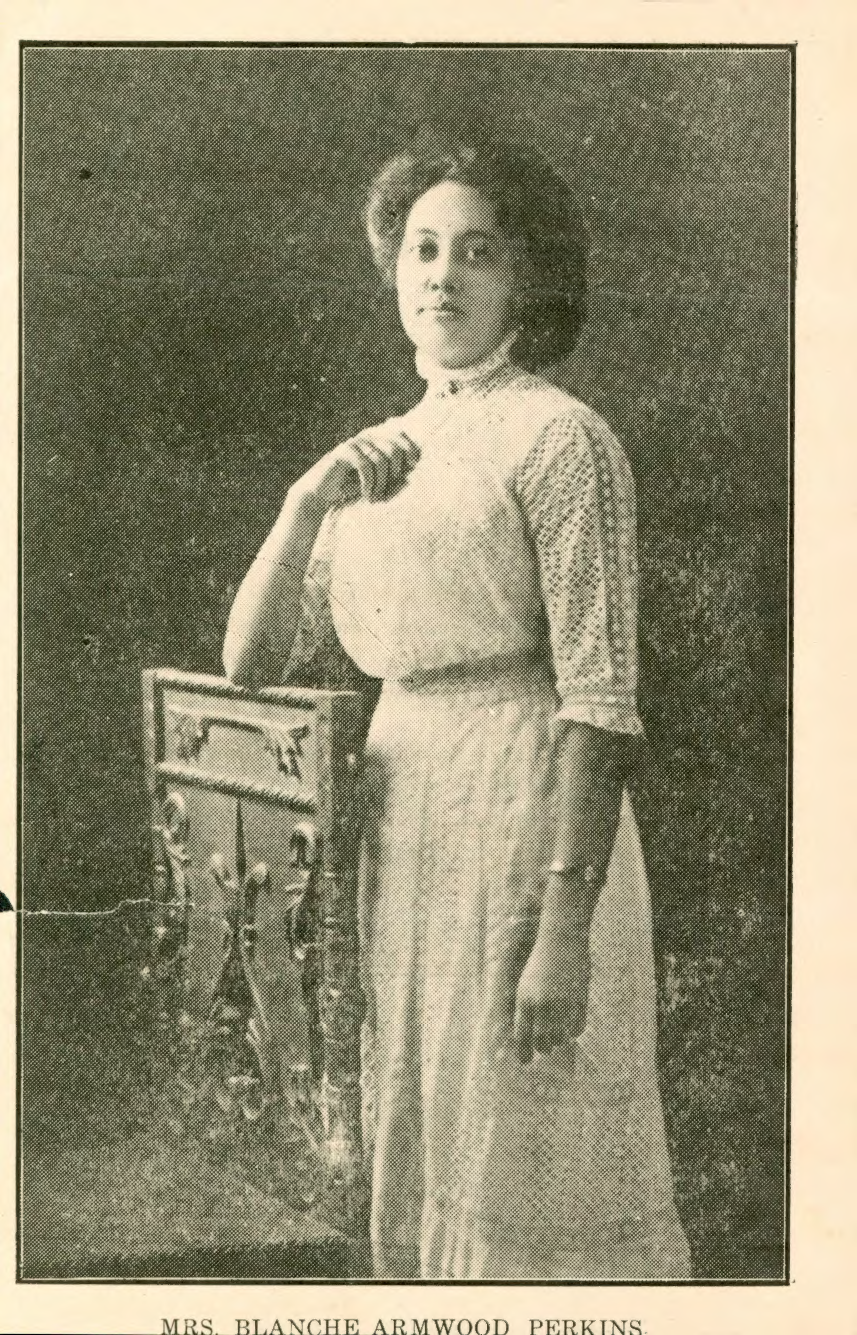
- Blanche Armwood Perkins from a 1916 flier
- Born: Blanche Mae Armwood; January 23, 1890; Tampa, Florida, US
- Died: October 16, 1939 (aged 49); Medford, Massachusetts, US
- Other name: Blanche Armwood Beatty
- Occupations: Educator; activist
- Spouse: John C. Beatty

Blanche Mae Armwood (January 23, 1890 – October 16, 1939) was an American educator, women's suffrage advocate, activist, and the first African-American woman in the state of Florida to graduate from an accredited law school. Armwood was also the first Executive Secretary of the Tampa Urban League and a founder of five Household Industrial Arts Schools for African-American women in five different states. Armwood High School in Seffner, Florida is named in her honor.

== Early life ==
Blanche Armwood was born on January 23, 1890, in Tampa, Florida to Levin Armwood Jr. and Margaret Holloman. Born into a prominent middle-class family, she was the youngest of five children. Her mother was a skilled dressmaker and her father was Tampa's first black policeman in the late 1870s and a county deputy sheriff in 1895. He was also the Supervisor of County Roads and the supervisor of Mt. Zion school. Her father and her brother, Walter, owned the only black-owned drugstore in Tampa, the "Gem." Walter Armwood was also a professor at Bethune-Cookman University and a state supervisor for the U.S. Bureau Negro Economics. Blanche Armwood's father and paternal grandfather, Levin Armwood Sr., were both born into slavery, in Georgia and North Carolina respectively. The family moved to Hillsborough County in 1866 when Levin Jr. was eleven years old. Her great uncle, John Armwood, was an early landowner who homesteaded 159 acres of land in Hillsborough County and served as a negotiator between the Seminole Native Americans and white settlers along the Florida frontier. Her maternal grandfather, Adam Holloman, was a freeman who spent his entire life in the Tampa area. He owned citrus groves and was the Hillsborough County Commissioner from 1873 to 1877.

Blanche Armwood's parents, having been unable to complete their formal educations, sent her to a private school, St. Peter Claver Catholic School. She graduated with honors in 1902. That same year, at the age of twelve, Armwood passed the State Uniform Teacher's Examination. As Tampa did not have a high school for black students, she attended Spelman Seminary (later Spelman College) in Atlanta, Georgia. She excelled in English and Latin courses. In 1906, at age sixteen, she graduated summa cum laude from Spelman, earning a teacher's certificate.

== Career and activism ==
Armwood returned to Tampa and began teaching in the Hillsborough County Public Schools where she would remain for the next seven years. In 1913, Armwood suspended her teaching career when she married attorney Daniel Webster Perkins and relocated to Knoxville, Tennessee. The marriage was annulled the following year, and Armwood returned to Tampa. Armwood's service to the community began in 1914 when the Tampa Gas Company, in conjunction with the Hillsborough County Board of Education and the Colored Ministers Alliance commissioned her to organize an industrial arts school designed to train black women in the domestic sciences. From this alliance spawned the Tampa School of Household Arts, which was founded around 1915. The school trained black women and girls to use then modern household gas appliances as well as other skills which would enable the students to excel in domestic service. Following the school's first year of operation, over two hundred women received certificates of completion. Later, Armwood would establish similar schools in Roanoke, Virginia; Rock Hill, South Carolina; Athens, Georgia and New Orleans, Louisiana.

In 1916 she was honored at the Oddfellows Hall for her establishment of schools teaching household arts.

Between 1917 and 1920, while living in New Orleans and married to dentist John C. Beatty, Armwood received state and federal acclaim for her work in training domestic workers. In 1918, she published A Collection of War-Time Recipes, a cookbook which was popular with women of all races. Published during World War I, it had a particularly poignant introduction, stating that: "Every pound of white flour saved is equal to a bullet in our Nation’s defense."

In 1922, Jesse Thomas of the National Urban League nominated Armwood as the first Executive Secretary of the Tampa Urban League. Under her leadership, the Tampa Urban League established a public playground, a daycare center, and a kindergarten for black children and played a significant role in the development of a subdivision offering blacks decent and affordable housing. Throughout her service with the league, she served as assistant principal at Tampa's Harlem Academy School.

Armwood was appointed as the first Supervisor of Negro Schools by the Hillsborough County School Board. During her tenure, 1926–1934, she was instrumental in the school board's establishment of five new school buildings, improving the older schools, providing a vocational school for black students, increasing black teacher salaries, organizing parent-teacher associations at each school, and extending the school year for black students from six to nine months. She is also credited with establishing Booker T. Washington School in 1925. Initially a junior high school, the first for black students in Tampa, it was quickly expanded to include black senior high school students, another first, and was the first accredited school for black students in the county.

In addition to her leadership positions in Tampa, Armwood held positions in several national organizations, including the Chair of the Home Economics Department of the National Association of Colored Women, National Campaign Speaker for the Republican Party, and as State Organizer for the Louisiana Chapter of the NAACP. She was a frequent speaker on national and international lecture circuits, speaking about voting rights and racial inequality.

Armwood participated in the suffrage and the anti-lynching crusades. She worked closely with anti-lynching advocate Mary McLeod Bethune, including helping to raise funds and other resources for Bethune-Cookman College and other black schools. She was close friends with Clara Frye, a black nurse who provided the first medical facilities for blacks in Tampa. Armwood raised funds for Frye and helped establish the first training program for licensed black nurses and some of the first blood banks for blacks in Florida.

Her increased interest in politics and equal rights for blacks and women led her to pursue a career in law. In 1934, Armwood enrolled in Howard Law School. She earned her Juris Doctor in 1938 making her the first black female from the state of Florida to graduate from an accredited law school.

== Death and legacy ==
While on a speaking tour in Medford, Massachusetts, Armwood became ill and died unexpectedly on October 16, 1939. She is buried in her family's plot at Tampa's L'Unione Italiana Cemetery, land purchased from the Armwood family by The Italian Club.

In 1984, Congressman Michael Bilirakis and the Florida House of Representatives paid tribute to Armwood's legacy. That same year, Blanche Armwood Comprehensive High School, known today as Armwood High School, was opened in Tampa in her honor. Armwood is also memorialized on historical markers for Booker T. Washington School and L'Unione Italiana Cemetery. In 2014 she was memorialized with a bronze bust on Tampa Riverwalk's Historical Monument Trail. Encore!, the revitalization of Tampa's black business and entertainment district, has renamed a street in Armwood's honor.

== See also ==
- List of Florida suffragists
