= Tampa Heights =

- Neighborhood
- Location within the state of Florida
- Coordinates: 27°58′12″N 82°27′36″W
- Country: United States
- State: Florida
- County: Hillsborough
- City: Tampa

Population (2000)
  - Total: 16,393
- Time zone: UTC-5 (Eastern (EST))
  - Summer (DST): UTC-4 (EDT)

Tampa Heights is one of the oldest neighborhoods within the city limits of Tampa, situated in the central part of the city. As of the 2000 census, the neighborhood had a population of 16,393.

Historic buildings in the area include the Tampa Free Library. Redevelopment efforts are underway in the community and include an extension of Tampa Riverwalk and renovation of Water Works Park (Tampa, Florida).

== Description ==
Tampa Heights is bounded by the North Boulevard to the west, Dr. Martin Luther King Jr. Boulevard to the north, Downtown Tampa to the south, and Ybor Heights, V.M. Ybor, and Ybor City to the east. The land area of the neighborhood is 3.5 square miles (9.1 km^{2}).

Thomas P. Kennedy is credited with naming the area when he moved there calling it the "Highlands" and it was developed as Tampa's first suburb in the 1880s. Today the neighborhood is known for its diversity and historic status, but gentrification of the area is causing controversy.

== Demographics ==
As of the census of 2010, there were 5,782 people residing in Tampa Heights. The racial makeup of Tampa Heights was 59.4% Black or African American, 32.4% White, 21.3% of the population was Hispanic or Latino of any race, 3.7% from two or more races, 3.4% from other races, 0.6% Asian and Pacific Islander and 0.3% Native American.

In Tampa Heights, the population was spread out, with 8% under 5 years; 8% 5 to 9 years; 14.7% 10 to 19 years; 29.7% 20 to 39 years; 24.7% 40 to 59 years; 11.6% 60 to 79 years; 3.3% 80 years and over.

== New development ==
In recent years, Tampa Heights has seen new people flow into the area aiming to restore it. Many new businesses have opened in the area such as art galleries and coffee shops. A new development called "The Heights of Tampa" has begun with some initial phases of construction. The project is mixed use for residential and commercial. It would be the northern end of the Tampa Riverwalk.

New developments also include Armature Works. Armature Works is a 73,000-square-foot space that consists of event spaces, trendy restaurants and bars, workspaces and the Heights Public Market.

The building dates back to 1910. It was originally a warehouse that stored TECO streetcars.

One way to access Armature Works is by walking along the Tampa Riverwalk.

== See also ==
- Downtown Tampa, due south of the neighborhood.
- Hillsborough River, borders the area to the west.
- Riverside Heights, historic neighborhood that hugs the Hillsborough River
- Seminole Heights, similar historic neighborhood also undergoing gentrification.
- West Tampa, historic neighborhood with Cuban roots a couple miles to the northwest
