= Riverside Heights =

- Neighborhood
- Location within the state of Florida
- Coordinates: 27°58′41″N 82°28′27″W
- Country: United States
- State: Florida
- County: Hillsborough
- City: Tampa

Population (2000)
  - Total: 2,949
- Time zone: UTC-5 (Eastern (EST))
  - Summer (DST): UTC-4 (EDT)
- ZIP codes: 33602, 33603 and 33607

Riverside Heights is a neighborhood within the city limits of Tampa, Florida. As of the 2000 census the neighborhood had a population of 2,949. The ZIP Codes serving the area are 33602, 33603 and 33607.

== Geography ==
Riverside Heights boundaries are South Seminole Heights to the north, Hillsborough River to the west, Columbus Drive to the south, and Tampa Heights to the east. A new marker sign has been put up in the middle of the neighborhood.

== Demographics ==
Source: Hillsborough County Atlas

At the 2000 census there were 2,949 people and 1,299 households residing in the neighborhood. The population density was 4,229/mi^{2}. The racial makeup of the neighborhood was 79.0% White, 14.0% African American, less than 1% Native American, 1% Asian, 4.0% from other races, and 2.0% from two or more races. Hispanic or Latino of any race were about 31%.

Of the 1,299 households 23% had children under the age of 18 living with them, 36% were married couples living together, 17% had a female householder with no husband present, and 9% non-families. 32% of households were made up of individuals.

The age distribution was 20% under the age of 18, 20% from 18 to 34, 24% from 35 to 49, 17% from 50 to 64, and 18% 65 or older. For every 100 females, there were 84.6 males.

The per capita income for the neighborhood was $19,702. About 10% of the population were below the poverty line. Of those, 27% are under age 18.

== See also ==
- Hillsborough River
- Neighborhoods in Tampa, Florida
- Seminole Heights
- Tampa Heights
- Ybor City
