= Clara C. Frye =

American nurse (1872–1936)

- Born: April 17, 1872; Albany, New York, U.S.
- Died: April 8, 1936 (aged 63); Florida, U.S.
- Occupation: Nurse

Clara C. Frye (April 17, 1872 – April 8, 1936) was an American nurse in Tampa, Florida who established the Clara Frye Hospital, where she worked for twenty years in the early 1900s. Frye's hospital admitted patients of all ethnicities. She was inducted into the Florida Women's Hall of Fame in 2013.

== Early life and education ==
Frye was born Albany, New York and raised in Montgomery, Alabama, the daughter of Joseph Draughn and Frances "Fannie" Fordham Draughn. Her mother was born in England. She trained for a nursing career in Chicago and in Montgomery.

== Career ==
Frye moved to Tampa with her husband. In 1908, after doing some informal nursing for Black patients in Tampa, she opened a hospital in her home, making it Tampa's only hospital to admit Black people. Her dining room table was the operating table. Frye was the only permanent employee of the hospital; many of her patients were unable to pay for their care. A larger, separate building was secured in 1923 and was purchased by the City of Tampa in 1928. At the time, the Tampa Municipal Hospital, now Tampa General Hospital, did not admit African American patients. The children of Donald Brenham McKay were among her first patients, and Mary T. Cash, Florida's first Black registered nurse, worked with Frye in the 1920s.

Frye invented a hospital bed and submitted the design for a patent in 1907. In 1919, she was also part of an effort to open an orphanage for Black children near Tampa.

== Personal life and legacy ==
Clara Draughn married barber Sherman H. Frye in 1888. They had two sons, and divorced in 1912. She died in 1936. The Clara Frye Memorial Hospital that existed in West Tampa from 1938 to 1967 was named after her. The original Tampa General Hospital building was renamed after Frye in 1991. Frye is represented among other prominent Tampa historical figures on the Tampa Riverwalk with a bronze bust. A memorial garden at Water Works Park (Tampa) honors her legacy. She was inducted into the Hillsborough County Women's Hall of Fame in 2011, and into the Florida Women's Hall of Fame in 2013. There is a historical marker displaying Frye's story in Tampa Heights.
