= Gasparilla Pirate Festival =

Parade and holiday in Tampa, Florida

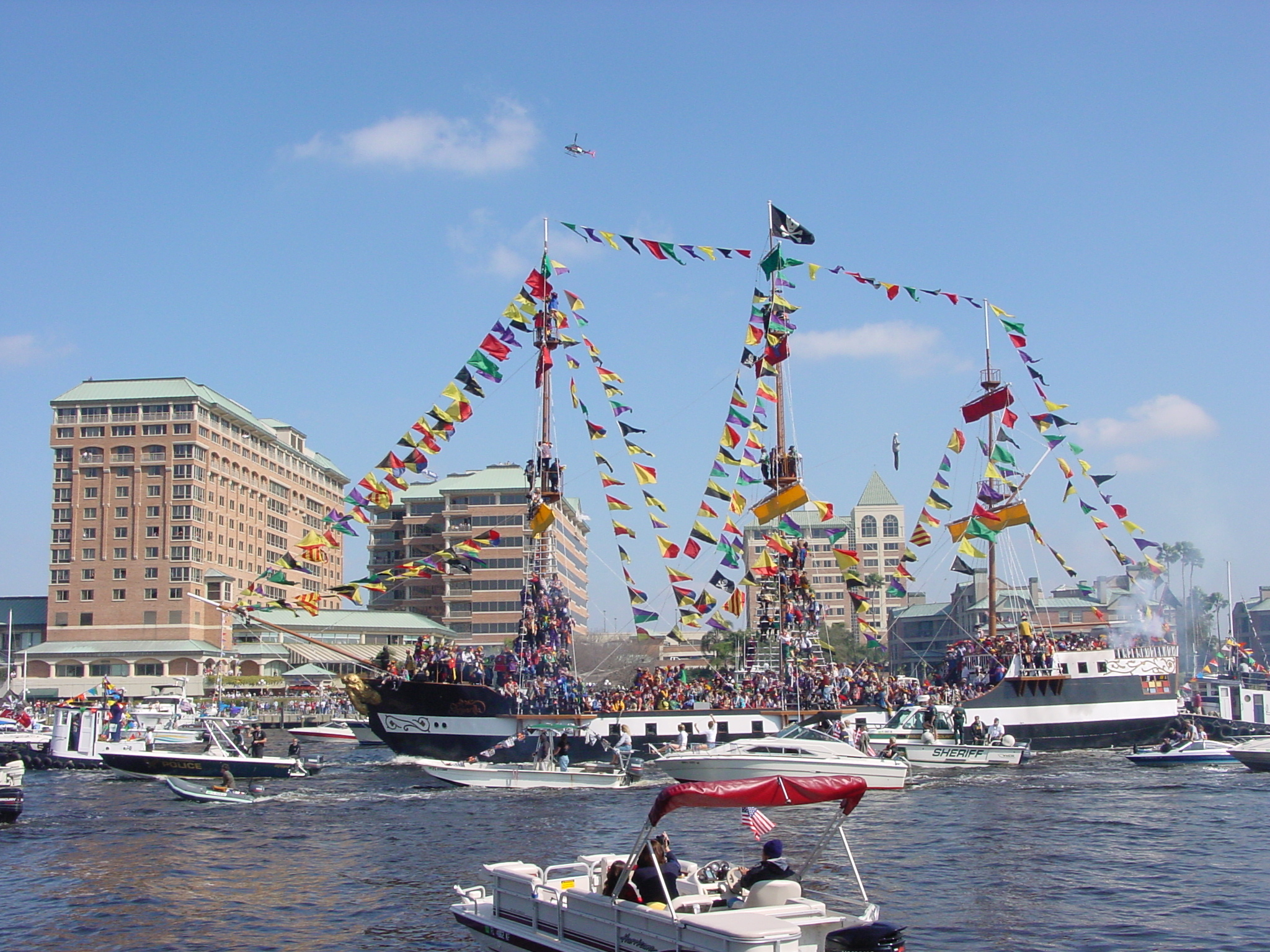
- The Jose Gasparilla II sails to downtown Tampa, Gasparilla Day 2003.
- Genre: Parades and related events
- Date: Last Saturday in January (Parade of Pirates)
- Begins: Mid-January (Children's Parade)
- Ends: Early March (Outward Voyage Home)
- Frequency: Annual
- Location: Tampa, Florida
- Country: United States
- Inaugurated: 1904
- Most recent: 31 January 2026
- Next event: 30 January 2027
- Attendance: 300,000
- Organiser: Ye Mystic Krewe of Gasparilla, City of Tampa
- Website: gasparillapiratefest.com

The Gasparilla Pirate Festival (often simply referred to as Gasparilla /ˌɡæspəˈrɪlə/) is a large parade and a host of related community events held in Tampa, Florida, United States, most years since 1904. The centerpiece of the festivities is the Parade of Pirates, which is framed as a friendly invasion by the crew of the mythical pirate José Gaspar (also known as Gasparilla), a popular figure in Florida folklore. The Parade of Pirates is often referred to as the Gasparilla Parade by locals, and the date of the event is known as Gasparilla Day.

The Parade of Pirates and some related events are organized by Ye Mystic Krewe of Gasparilla (YMKG), a local club modeled after the krewes of Mardi Gras in New Orleans. On Gasparilla Day, members of YMKG play the parts of Gaspar and his crew by donning pirate regalia and sailing across Tampa Bay aboard the Jose Gasparilla II, a 137-foot-long (42 m) replica pirate ship which is actually a steel barge converted to look like a large West Indiaman. Accompanied by hundreds of private boats and firing a continuous barrage of loud mini-cannons, Gaspar's motley band make their way to the Tampa Convention Center, where they meet the mayor and demand the key to the city in a playful ceremony. YMKG then stages a 4.5-mile-long (7.2 km) victory parade down Bayshore Boulevard featuring over 100 floats, marching bands and other live entertainers, and dozens of additional krewes and community organizations. Participants on floats and on foot throw beads, coins, and other trinkets to a crowd of spectators that usually numbers about 300,000, making the Parade of Pirates one of the largest annual parades in the United States.

The Gasparilla Parade began as a surprise land-based pirate "invasion" by a few costumed civic leaders during the city's May Day festival in 1904. Over the next decade, a pirate-themed parade and festival was sometimes staged as an add-on to other community events, with the highlight of the early period being the first seaborne invasion in 1911. The Gasparilla Festival became a stand-alone event in 1913, and with the exception of hiatuses during world wars, it has been celebrated almost every year since. The parade has been scheduled for late January or early February for much of its existence, and since 2005, it has taken place on the last Saturday in January. The route of the Gasparilla Parade has traditionally wound along the waterfront into downtown Tampa, and since 2011, it has ended along the Tampa Riverwalk, where festivities continue into the nighttime hours.

Over time, the formerly one-day event has evolved into a "Gasparilla Season" which runs from approximately the beginning of the year until mid-March. Two other major parades during this time are the Gasparilla Children's Parade, which runs a shorter route on Bayshore Boulevard one week before the main parade, and the Sant' Yago Illuminated Knight Parade, which is organized by the Krewe of the Knights of Sant' Yago in the historic neighborhood of Ybor City two weeks after the main parade. Besides the three large parades, the city hosts many other community events during this time including the Gasparilla Film Festival, the Gasparilla Festival of the Arts, the Gasparilla Distance Classic, the Gasparilla Music Festival, the Gasparilla Bowl college football game, and a broad slate of other events that varies from year to year. Most of these events are not organized or officially sanctioned by the city or YMKG, which have only limited legal control of the Gasparilla name. Taken together, the events of Tampa's Gasparilla Season have an estimated local economic impact of over $40 million.

== Description ==
=== Parade of Pirates ===
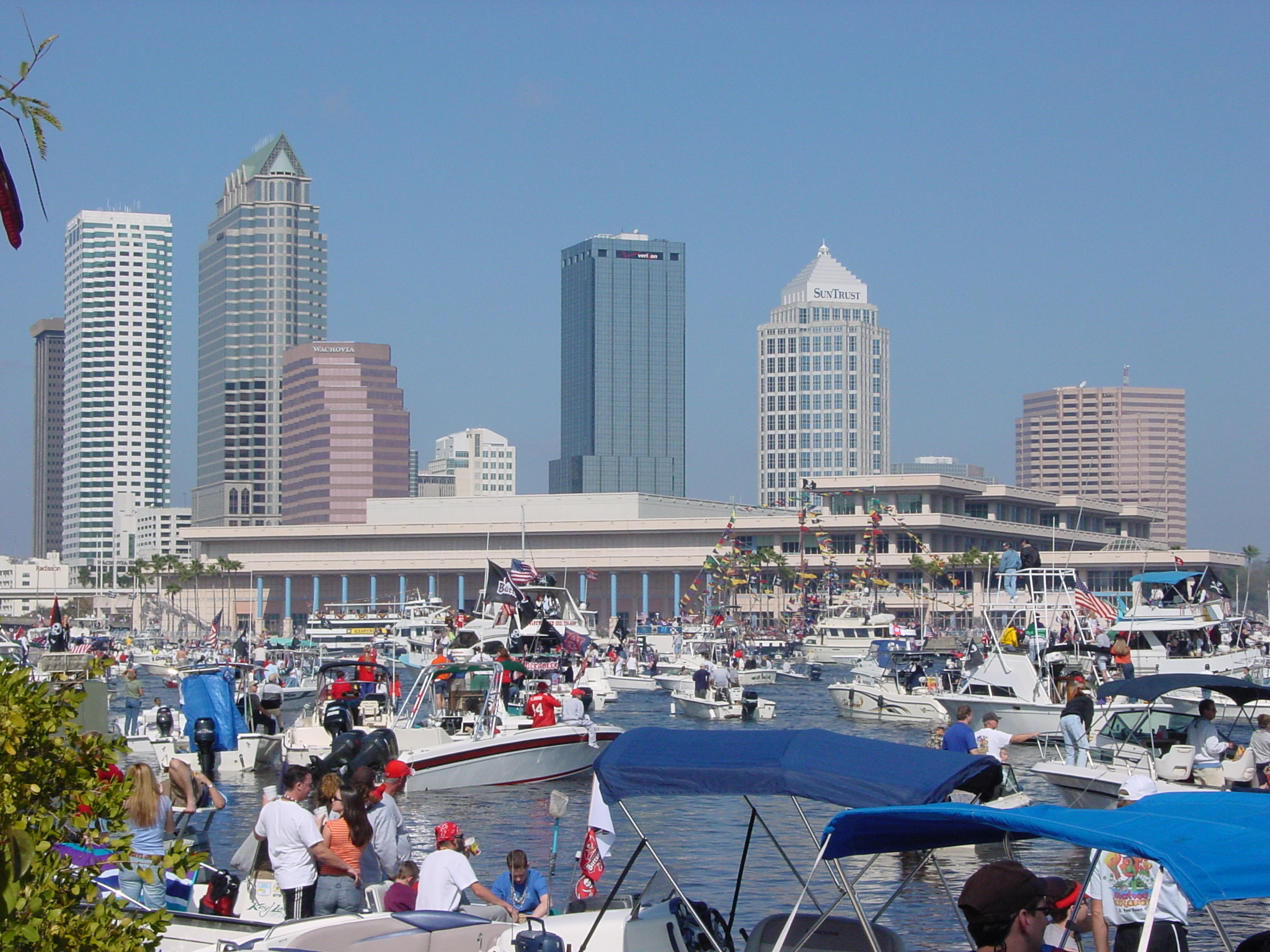
Flotilla of boats near downtown during the pirate invasion, 2003

The Jose Gasparilla II maneuvers into Garrison Channel in 2024

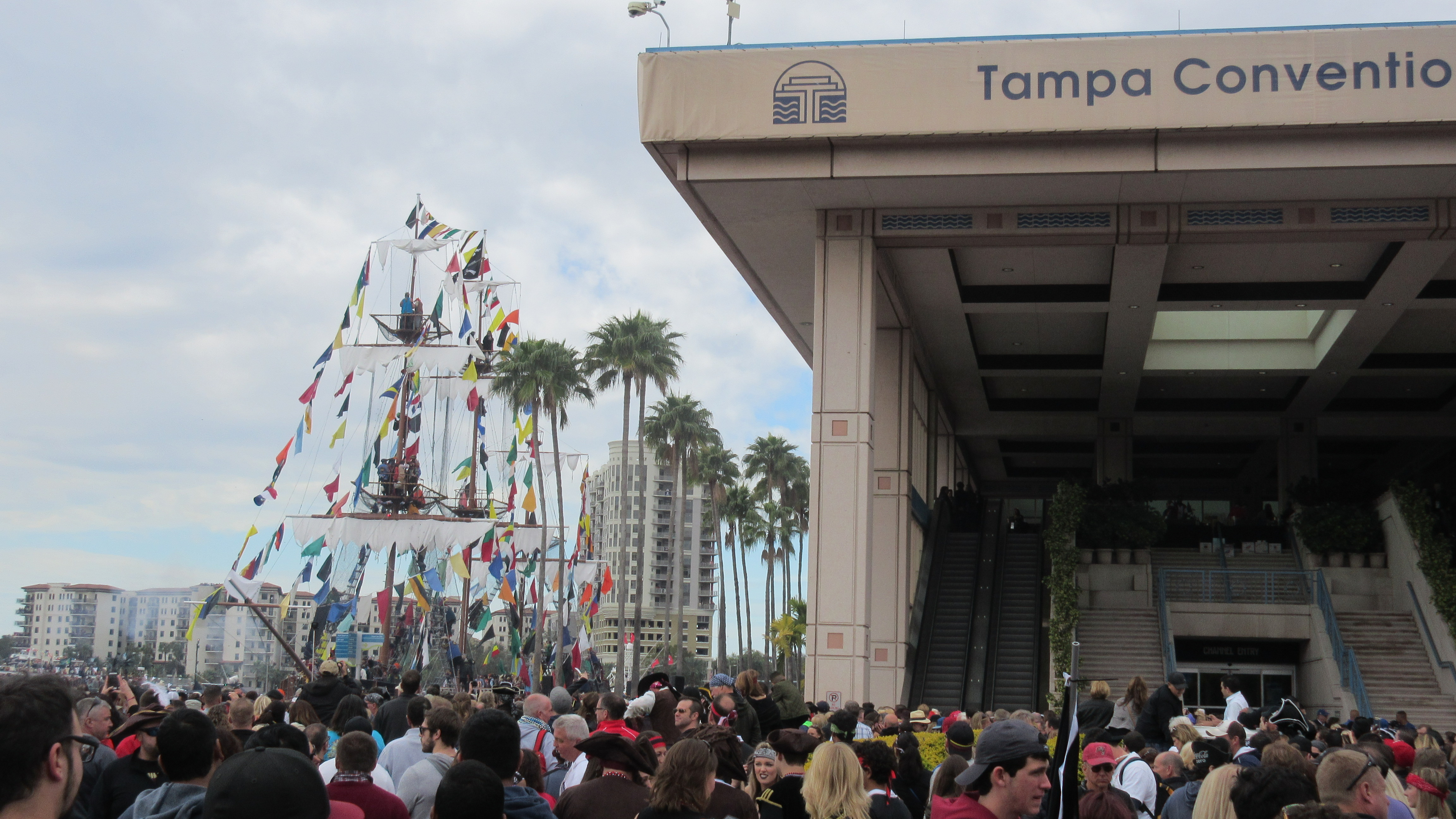
The Jose Gasparilla II moors behind the Tampa Convention Center in 2017

The theme and focal point of Gasparilla is a theatrical invasion by mythical pirate José Gaspar and his crew, who are portrayed by members of Ye Mystic Krewe of Gasparilla (YMKG), an organization created for this purpose in 1904. Around noon on Gasparilla Day, members of YMKG set sail across Tampa Bay from the Tampa Yacht Club near Ballast Point Park on the Jose Gasparilla II, a replica pirate ship built from a flat-bottomed steel barge. Firing a near-continuous barrage of loud mini-cannons and accompanied by hundreds of private boats, the ship makes its way between Davis Island and Harbour Island to the Garrison Channel, where it moors along the Riverwalk behind the Tampa Convention Center. The krewe disembarks into a crowd of revelers and the pirate captain demands that the mayor hand over the key to the city in a playful ceremony which has had different outcomes in different years. Whether or not the mayor actually "surrenders", the pirates stage a victory parade along Bayshore Boulevard.

During the parade, members of Ye Mystic Krewe of Gasparilla along with about fifty other krewes throw beads, coins, and various souvenirs to the throngs from over 100 floats, most of them pirate-themed. In addition to the krewes, high school and university marching bands and drill teams often participate, and many local businesses and organizations build and enter their own elaborate floats from which they also throw trinkets to the crowd. The parade has been broadcast live on local television for decades: WFLA-TV has provided coverage since 1955, and WTVT-TV also covered the parade from 1955 to 1980.

==== Krewes ====
Many of the events of Tampa's Gasparilla season are organized by social and charitable organizations known as krewes, which were originally modeled on the Mardi Gras krewes of New Orleans. Ye Mystic Krewe of Gasparilla came together informally in 1904 to stage a mock invasion during a community festival. The organization has continued to stage the Gasparilla Parade ever since and has evolved into an exclusive social club and registered non-profit. As the festivities have become larger and more complicated over the years, YMKG has accepted corporate sponsorships to defray costs and has employed local firm EventFest to plan the parade with the city. Each year, YMKG members elect a King and Queen of Gasparilla to preside over various club galas and events during the season. Besides the Gasparilla parades and holding its own private events, YMKG raises money for various charitable causes and annually endows several college scholarships through its community fund.

The Krewe of Gasparilla was Tampa's only officially recognized Gasparilla krewe until the co-ed Krewe of Venus was organized in 1965. This was followed by the Ybor City–based Krewe of the Knights of Sant' Yago in 1972 and the Tampa Rough Riders in 1978. The first all-female Ye Loyal Krewe of Grace O'Malley joined in 1992. More krewes were established after YMKG opened up participation in the parade in the 1990s. Krewes are centered around various ethnic, cultural, and historical themes or favorite charity causes, and much like the krewes of Mardi Gras, members often spend a great deal of money on elaborate costumes, beads, and floats.

Currently, over fifty krewes march in the Gasparilla Parade of Pirates, with smaller krewes participating on a rotating basis due to the limited number of available slots. Many of the same krewes—large and small—also participate in the Gasparilla Children's Parade and the Sant' Yago Knight Parade.

==== Floats ====
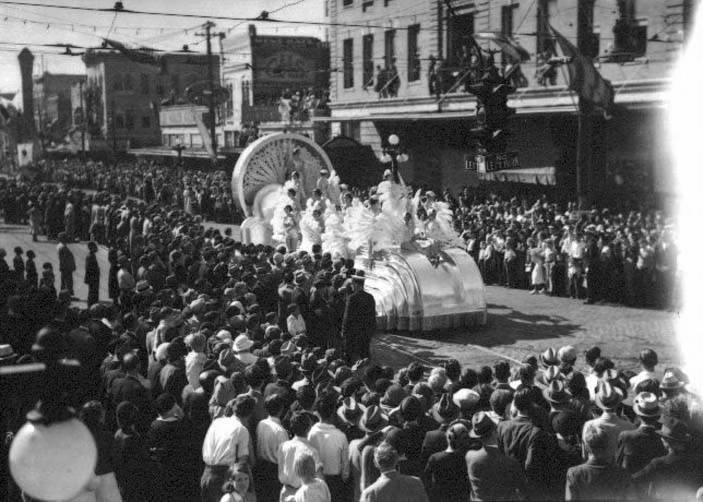
Art deco–style float downtown, 1934

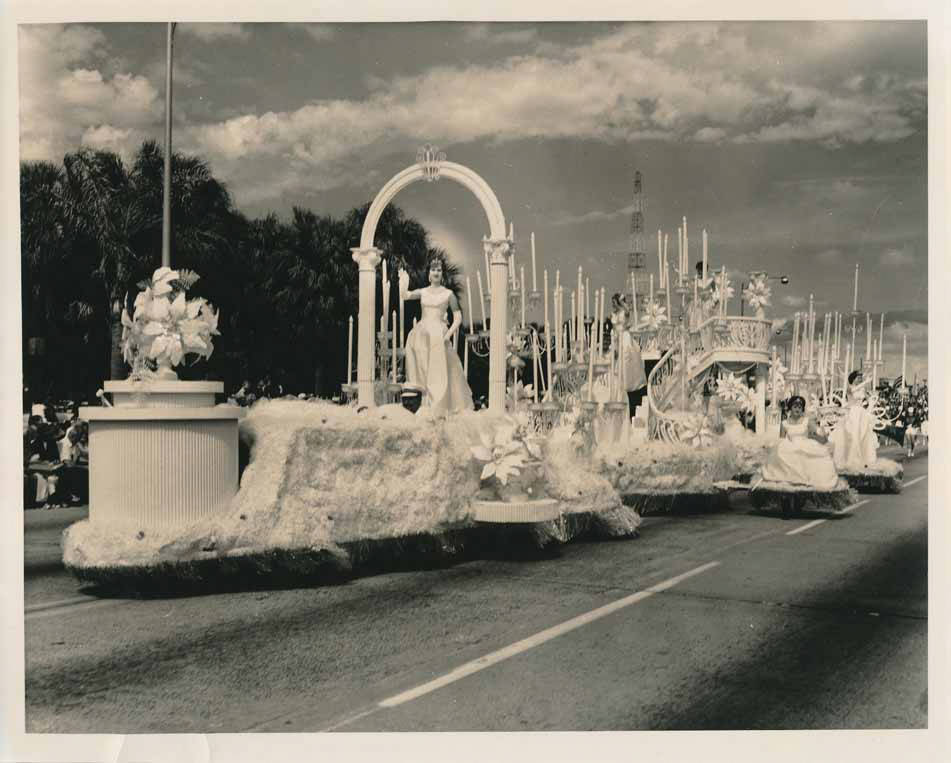
Multi-segmented Hav-A-Tampa float on Bayshore Blvd, 1963

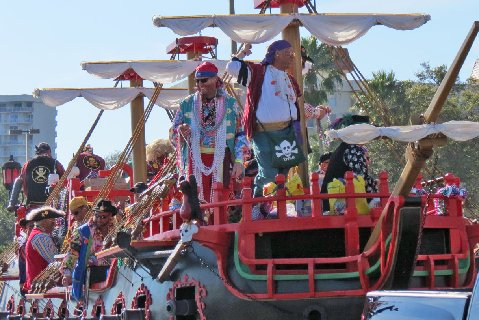
Typical YMKG float, 2013

Members of YMKG fire mini-cannons and throw beads, 2024.

Parade floats have long been a part of Gasparilla festivities. The earliest examples were decorated wagons or flatbeds pulled by horses or trucks, or simply a decorated truck by itself. More involved designs became more common after World War I, and by the 1950s, several multi-segmented floats with elaborate decorations rolled down Bayshore Boulevard on Gasparilla Day.

As of 2024, 115 floats participated in the Parade of Pirates; 14 used by YMKG and the rest by other krewes, local businesses, civic organizations, and sports teams. Some remain relatively simple in design, but a trend in recent years has been to build more elaborate floats with lights, moving animatronic elements, water or smoke effects, and hidden wet bars and bathrooms for riders, with some costing as much as $100,000 to design and construct. Outside of Gasparilla season, YMKG's active and retired floats along with the floats of several other krewes and organizations are stored in the "float barn", a warehouse procured by YMKG for that purpose.

==== Throws and cannons ====
Parade participants on floats and on foot have traditionally tossed souvenirs as they make their way along the route, but the specific items have changed over time. Plastic beads like those at New Orleans Mardi Gras festivities are by far the most prevalent item, with varieties ranging from simple single-color necklaces to intricate and expensive designs, most of which are purchased by krewe members themselves. So many beads are thrown that in recent years, the city has organized post-parade volunteer cleanup efforts which annually collect thousands of pounds of plastic from the parade route and nearby Tampa Bay.

Though very popular now, beads were rarely seen at Gasparilla Parades before the mid-1980s. The two most common throws before that were plastic or metal commemorative coins produced annually by various krewes and spent gun cartridges. For decades, many members of YMKG walked the parade route armed with six-shooters or other handguns loaded with blanks which they frequently fired in the air. The empty shells were tossed aside as the pirate reloaded, sending children scrambling for the unique souvenirs. This tradition was restricted in the interest of safety in 1992 and ended entirely several years later. While pirates on foot are no longer allowed to use firearms during the parade, trained members of YMKG still fire loud mini-cannons from several specialized floats and during the cross-bay voyage of the Jose Gasparilla II.

=== Prelude and departure ===
Several semi-theatrical events take place before and after the Gasparilla Day pirate invasion:

- About two weeks before the Parade of Pirates, a U.S. Navy ship volunteers to be attacked by several small boats of the "Ybor City Navy" armed with stale loaves of Cuban bread and water hoses. The U.S. Navy returns fire with their water hoses and (on occasion) rotten vegetables, but they are eventually forced to surrender to the Alcalde of Ybor City, who, as the story goes, has been hired by José Gaspar to help clear resistance to his impending pirate attack. The event was staged on an annual basis beginning in the early 1950s but was discontinued after the September 11, 2001 attacks. It has taken place intermittently since then, with the museum ship SS American Victory standing in for the U.S. Navy.
- A few days before the Parade of Pirates, members of Ye Mystic Krewe of Gasparilla in full pirate regalia "kidnap" the mayor from city hall and transport them to a downtown park before assembled local media and onlookers to demand the city's surrender. The mayor playfully refuses, and the pirates warn that José Gaspar will arrive with an invasion force on the following Saturday to steal the key to the city.
- The Outbound Voyage is the culminating event of the Gasparilla season which was revived in 2008 after being discontinued in 1964. During this ceremony, the pirates return the key of the city to the mayor, climb aboard the Jose Gasparilla II, and retrace their route from Gasparilla Day by sailing away across Tampa Bay while festivities continue along the Tampa Riverwalk. The Outbound Voyage usually takes place on the first Saturday in March.

=== Children's Parade ===
Gasparilla Children's Parade in 2018

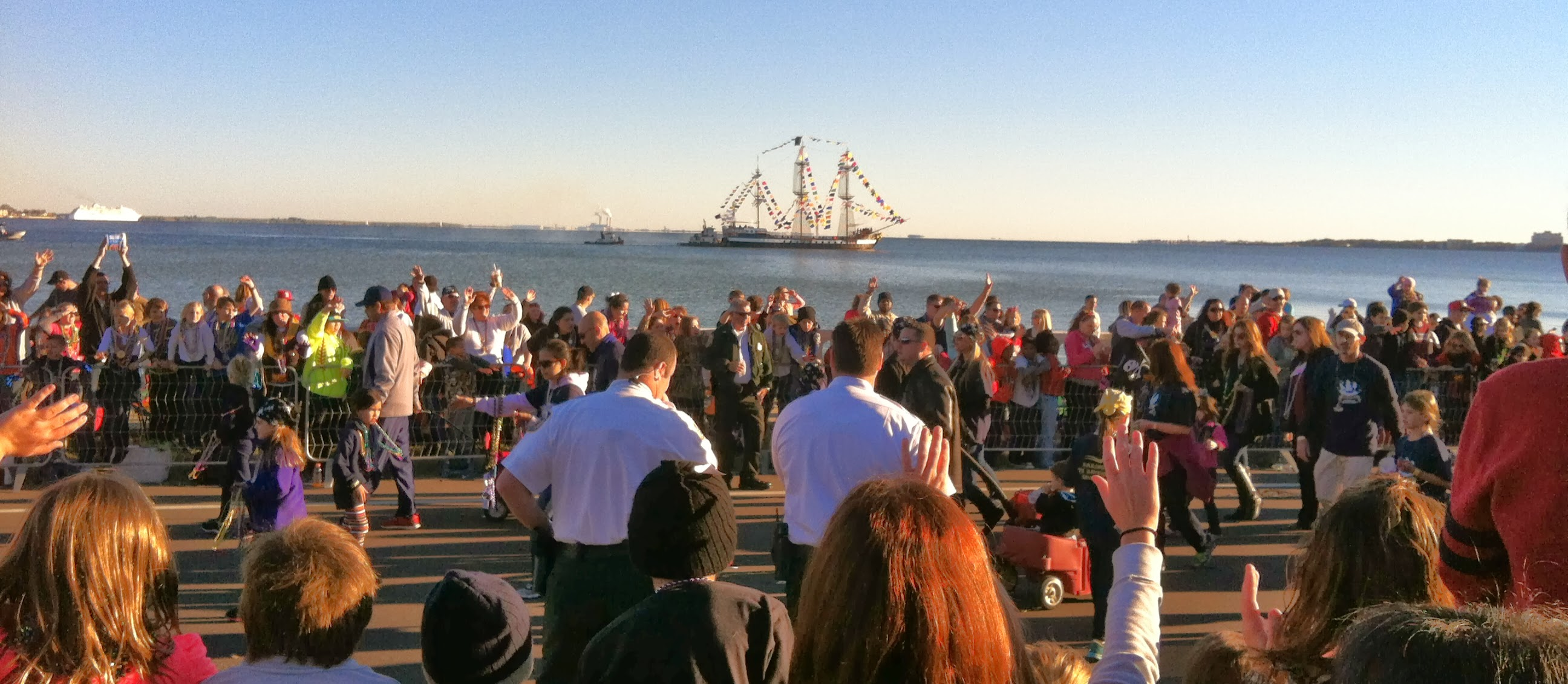
The Jose Gasparilla II sailing in Tampa Bay during the Children's Parade

The Children's Gasparilla Extravaganza is held on the Saturday prior to the main parade, currently the second-to-last Saturday in January. It is billed as a family-friendly event, as unlike the Parade of Pirates, alcohol is not allowed along the parade route, which runs along Bayshore Boulevard and is about half as long as the main Gasparilla Parade. The Children's Parade was first held in 1947 and was a simple affair that mostly featured schools and children's organizations pulling homemade floats for a few blocks in downtown Tampa, though it slowly increased in complexity and popularity over the decades. It moved to its current route in 2002 and usually draws about 100,000 attendees.

The Children's Parade now features many of the same krewes and several of the same professional floats featured in the main parade. Children of krewe members don costumes and ride on the floats tossing beads and trinkets to the crowd, and local youth organizations such as sports and dance teams also participate, usually performing along the route. Various activities and events for children are held in and around downtown Tampa in the hours before the Children's Parade, including the Preschooler's Stroll, which is a short, informal parade of small children riding pirate-themed wagons, strollers, bicycles, and scooters reminiscent of the earliest versions of the children's parade. To add noise to the festivities, the pirate ship Jose Gasparilla usually sails nearby firing its mini-cannons during the parade, and the day ends with a fireworks display over Tampa Bay.

=== Sant' Yago Illuminated Knight Parade ===
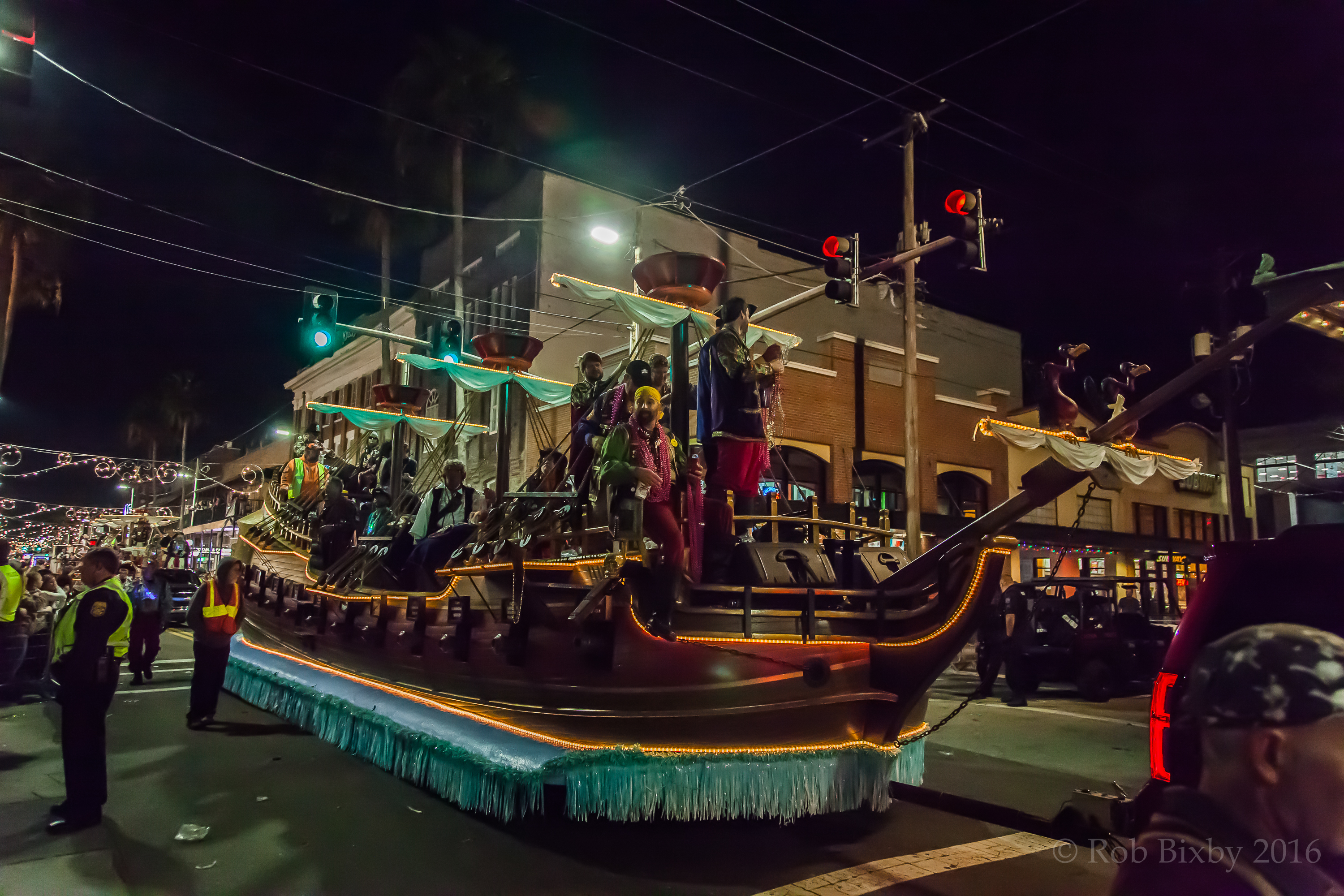
The Sant' Yago Illuminated Knight Parade in 2016

The Sant' Yago Illuminated Knight Parade (sometimes referred to as the Gasparilla night parade) has been organized since 1974 by the Krewe of the Knights of Sant' Yago. It is held in the historical neighborhood of Ybor City on a Saturday night, usually two weeks after the Parade of Pirates in early to mid-February. The Knight Parade features a similar mix of participants as the Parade of Pirates with the twist that most of the floats are brightly illuminated since the event begins after dark. Though it once had the reputation of being the most adult-oriented parade of Tampa's Gasparilla season, the city has tried to reduce public drunkenness and other unruly behavior in recent years and has promoted the parade as a family-friendly event, with some success.

=== Additional events of Gasparilla Season ===
Besides the three main parades and the many galas, parties, and fundraisers hosted by individual krewes, Tampa has long hosted a variety of other Gasparilla-related events from approximately January through March. Large-scale events during Gasparilla Season include the Gasparilla Festival of the Arts (established 1970), the Tampa Rough Rider's St. Patrick's Day Parade (first held in 1977), the Gasparilla Distance Classic road race (established 1978), the Gasparilla Film Festival (established 2006), the Gasparilla Music Festival (established 2013), and the Gasparilla Bowl college football game (renamed in 2018) along with a variety of other events that change from year to year.

One of the first related events was the Gasparilla Open, a PGA Tour stop sponsored by Ye Mystic Krewe of Gasparilla from 1932 to 1935. The 1935 edition had the largest prize purse on that year's PGA Tour ($4000), but with the deepening of the Great Depression, the tournament was discontinued. It returned in 1956 as the Gasparilla Invitational Tournament, an amateur competition which has been held annually ever since, usually at the Palma Ceia Golf and Country Club.

=== Economic impact ===
Crowd size for the Parade of Pirates is typically about 300,000, making it one of the largest annual parades in the United States. Most of the expense is paid by YMKG through memberships dues, vendor fees, tickets for premium seating areas, and corporate sponsorships, with the city redeploying police and other staff and resources to limit its financial contribution.

According to a 2004 study, the main parade alone had a local economic impact of $22 million and the combined events brought in over $40 million, with officials estimating that the impact has increased in the years since. To promote the area's many springtime events, Visit Tampa Bay, the local tourist bureau, has run multimillion-dollar advertising campaigns across the United States, Canada, and Europe encouraging visitors to experience "Gasparilla Season".

== Other local connections ==
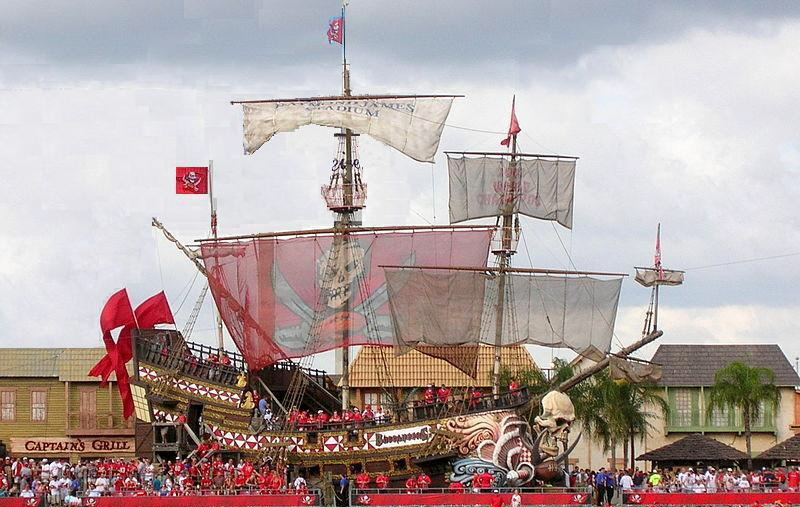
The pirate ship inside Raymond James Stadium

=== Tampa Bay Buccaneers ===
After Tampa was awarded an National Football League (NFL) franchise in 1974, the new owners ran a "name the team" contest in which "Buccaneers" was the clear winner due to the area's cultural association with Gasparilla and pirates. The Tampa Bay Buccaneers took the field at Tampa Stadium in 1976 wearing "creamsicle" orange and red uniforms with the image of "Bucco Bruce" on their helmets. "Bruce" was intended to be "swashbuckling Erroll Flynn-type character", but the Bucs' struggles on the field soon associated the winking/sneering logo with losing football. The team changed their color scheme and logo in the mid-1990s but kept the pirate theme, and when their new home at Raymond James Stadium opened in 1998, it included a replica pirate ship behind the north endzone from whence canons are fired during games.

=== Tampa Bay Lightning ===
The Tampa Bay Lightning's home ice is at Benchmark International Arena in downtown Tampa, which is a short distance along the Tampa Riverwalk from where the Jose Gasparilla II docks before the Gasparilla Parade. The team has played several home games on the day of the parade and have worn special Gasparilla-themed uniforms for some of those games. In 2018, the Lightning hosted the NHL All-Star Game on Gasparilla weekend, and the NHL entered a float in the parade and included pirate elements in the game logos and festivities, including having the Stanley Cup ride on the Jose Gasparilla II wearing a lifejacket.

On February 1, 2026, the day after one of the coldest Gasparilla Parades on record, the Lightning hosted their first NHL Stadium Series game on the Buccaneers' home field at Raymond James Stadium. Leaning into the pirate theme, the temporary rink was surrounded by Gasparilla-related decorations, members of Ye Mystic Krewe of Gasparilla theatrically introduced the teams, and canons were fired from the pirate ship and from smaller canons around the rink to celebrate the Lightning's victory.

=== Use of the name "Gasparilla" ===
A wide variety of local businesses, organizations, and smaller events ranging from restaurants to beauty pageants to classic car shows and food festivals use the names "Gaspar" or "Gasparilla"; according to the Florida Department of State, over 100 entities have registered related names.

Most of the organizations, events, and businesses who use "Gaspar" or "Gasparilla" are not affiliated with Ye Mystic Krewe of Gasparilla or the City of Tampa, neither of which owns the monikers. While some feel that the widespread use of the name constitutes a co-branding which promotes all similarly named organizations and Tampa in general, others believe that overuse could dilute the meaning and significance of the festival, and that the potential failures or missteps of one event or organization might reflect poorly on all the others. In 2019, YMKG began an effort to legally trademark the name Gasparilla to "protect" it for use by "appropriate community events", drawing complaints and counterclaims from others who have used the name or own the trademark for other, more narrow uses. In 2020, the issue was considered by the United States Trademark Trial and Appeal Board.

== History ==
=== Legend of José Gaspar ===
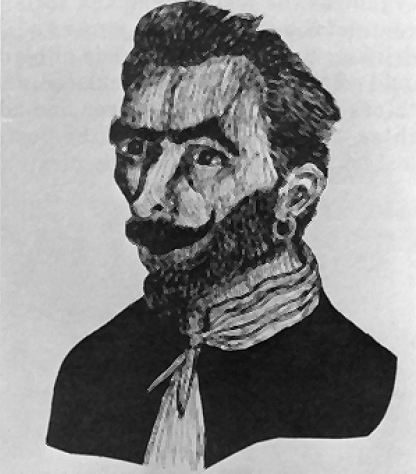
Sketch of José Gaspar from a 1900 advertising brochure

The theme of Gasparilla was inspired by the legend of the pirate José Gaspar, who supposedly operated off the west coast of Spanish Florida from the 1780s through the 1820s. Different versions of the story say that he was either a Spanish nobleman and advisor to King Charles III of Spain who was exiled after a romantic scandal in court, a traitorous admiral of the Spanish Royal Navy, who stole a ship and fled when his treachery was revealed, or an ambitious young officer who led a mutiny against either a cruel or cowardly captain, depending on the source. Whatever his origins, the legends agree that Gaspar fled to the virtually uninhabited southwestern coast of Spanish Florida in the 1780s and established his "pirate kingdom" on Gasparilla Island in Charlotte Harbor, south of Tampa Bay. Gaspar is said to have taken many ships and held many female hostages for ransom while preying on ships in the Gulf of Mexico from Louisiana to the Spanish Main aboard his flagship, the Floriblanca. His exploits came to a sudden end in 1821 when, to avoid being captured by the U.S. Navy pirate hunting schooner the USS Enterprise, he wrapped himself in anchor chains and threw himself overboard while shouting, "Gasparilla dies by his own hand, not the enemy's!"

Despite this colorful history, there is no evidence that a pirate named "Gaspar" or "Gasparilla" ever roamed the Florida coast. Archives in Spain make no mention of Gaspar as a member of the Spanish court or an officer in the Spanish navy; the U.S. Navy has no documentation indicating that any of its vessels ever encountered the pirate, and neither Gaspar nor anyone claiming to be a member of his crew are mentioned in the records of piracy trials from the period in which he was supposedly the "scourge of the Gulf of Mexico", which was well after the region's Golden Age of Piracy. Also, despite the fact that the supposed location of Gaspar's "regal base" at Gasparilla Island has been developed into the resort town of Boca Grande, no artifacts or other physical evidence of the hideout, his ship, or his lost treasure has ever been found in southwest Florida despite years of searching by amateur and professional treasure-seekers.

The first written account of José Gaspar appeared in the early 1900s as part of an advertising brochure for the Gasparilla Inn in the newly established town of Boca Grande on Gasparilla Island. The brochure was produced and widely distributed by the Charlotte Harbor and Northern Railway, which built the resort at the end of its rail line. Besides promotional material and contact information for the Gasparilla Inn, the brochure prominently featured the "Story of Jose Gasparilla", the "last of the Buccaneers" who it said had terrorized the Gulf of Mexico for almost 40 years. Among its many dubious claims, the short biography said that the nickname "Gasparilla" means "Gaspar the outlaw" in Spanish when it is actually a diminutive form meaning "little Gaspar"; it claimed that Gasparilla Island was named for the pirate when the name actually appears on Spanish and English maps from well before his supposed arrival; and it claimed that the "bleached bones" of Gaspar's victims along with many old coins had been discovered in local "Indian mounds" when no such find has ever been documented. The brochure also claimed that the bulk of Gaspar's vast treasure cache "still lies unmoved" somewhere in the vicinity of Boca Grande.

The brochure was penned by publicist Pat Lemoyne, who combined and embellished regional tall tales attributed to well-known and recently deceased local fishing guide "Panther John" Gomez to create the legend of the pirate Gaspar. Years later, Lemoyne gave a local history lecture in which he explained that he had written the Gasparilla story "in a style that tourists like to hear" but that it was "without a true fact in it."

In 1923, author Francis Bradlee obtained a copy of the Gasparilla Inn brochure and, assuming it was factual, included Gaspar in a book he was writing about piracy in the West Indies. This error led to José Gaspar being mentioned in several additional non-fiction books about piracy and Florida history, causing ongoing confusion as to the authenticity of the legend. However, though many versions of Gaspar's adventures have been told in various forms over the years—including pulp adventure novels, tourist guides, and the official histories of Ye Mystic Krewe of Gasparilla—all have their basis in the fanciful version first printed in an advertisement for the Gasparilla Inn.

=== Parade origins ===
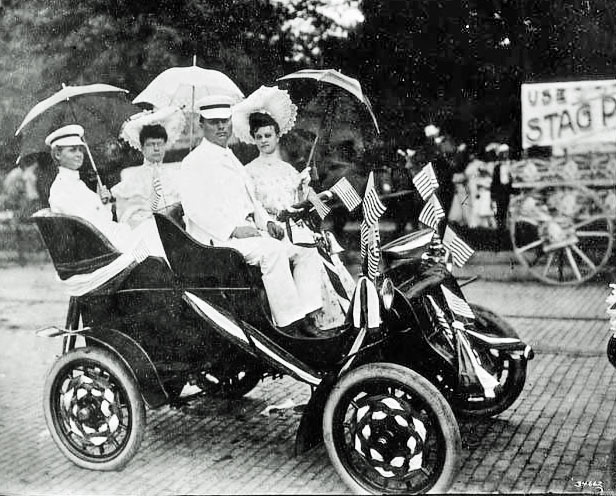
The second Gasparilla parade, 1905

The first Gasparilla parade was held in May 1904, after Tampa Tribune society editor Louise Frances Dodge and Tampa's director of customs George Hardee decided to combine elements of New Orleans Mardi Gras with the legend of the local pirate to promote and enliven Tampa's May Day celebration. The first occurrence consisted of several dozen local businessmen disguising themselves as pirates, riding horses through town to simulate a surprise pirate invasion, and encouraging startled observers to follow them to the May Day festival. The second Gasparilla the following year was not a surprise, as every automobile owner in town was invited to join the mounted pirates in the parade. The pirate-themed festival was not held again until 1910, when it was revived as part of a community celebration marking the opening of the Panama Canal. In 1913, a Gasparilla Carnival that included a pirate parade and weekend festival was organized as an independent event, as it has remained ever since.

==== Pirate ship ====
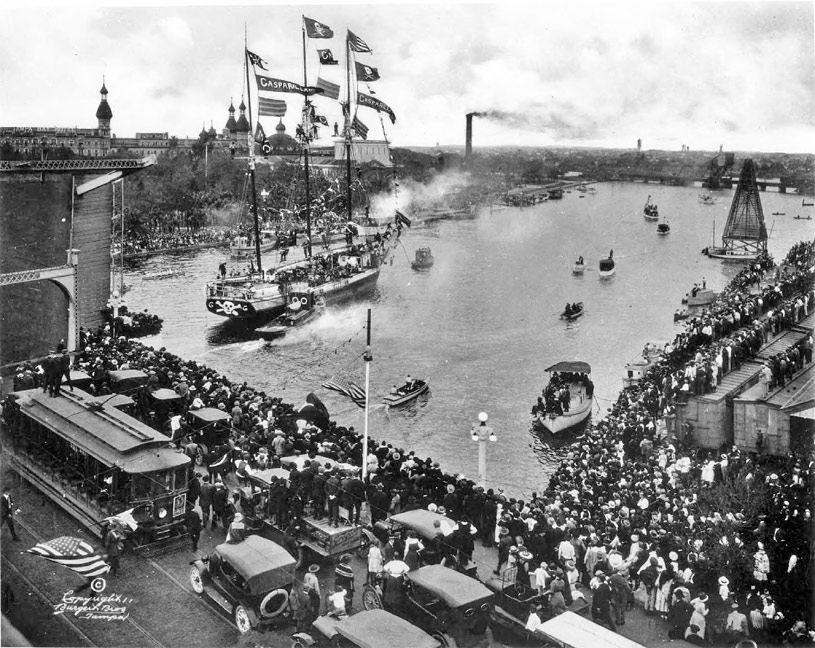
Gaspar's ship sails into downtown, 1922. Early pirate ships were borrowed and decorated for the day.

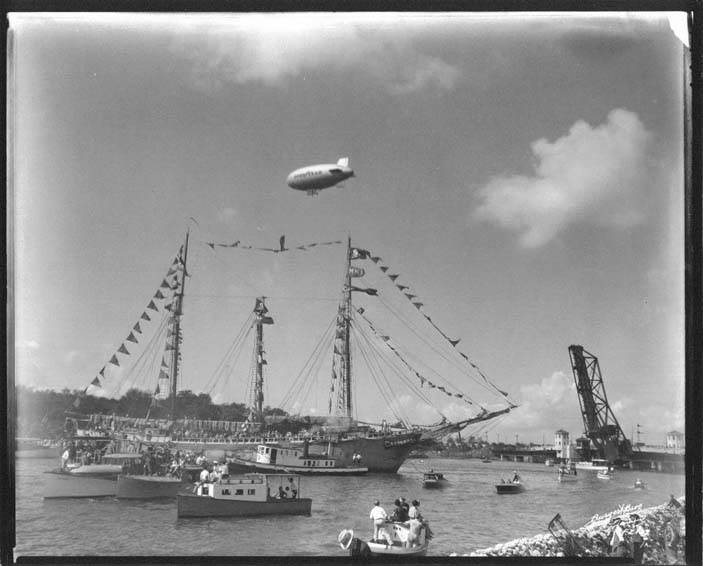
The Jose Gasparilla on the Hillsborough River with the Goodyear Blimp overhead, 1932

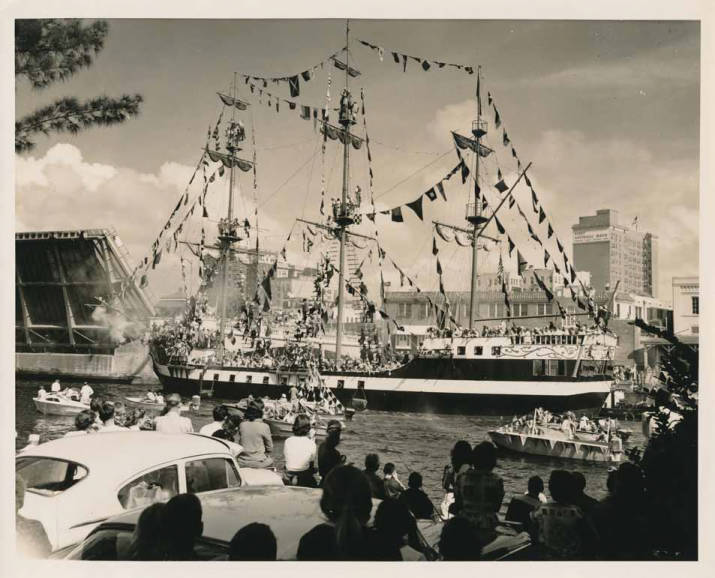
The Jose Gasparilla II near the same location, 1959. This modified barge is still used.

The first several mock pirate invasions were land-based, with the backstory depicting the pirate ship Octopus anchored offshore. The first shipborne invasion came in 1911, when a merchant vessel was borrowed, decorated, and temporarily rechristened the Jose Gaspar for the day. A series of borrowed ships were used until the 1930s, when Ye Mystic Krewe of Gasparilla bought an old merchant sloop and repurposed it as the Jose Gasparilla, which they used for about twenty years. The old wooden ship was in serious need of repairs and renovation by the early 1950s, so with financial assistance from the city of Tampa and the local chamber of commerce, YMKG commissioned a $100,000 replacement. The Jose Gasparilla II debuted during Gasparilla's 50th anniversary celebration in 1954 and has been used ever since.

Though designed to resemble an 18th-century West Indiaman, the Jose Gasparilla II is actually a 137-foot-long (42 m), 36-foot-wide (11 m) steel barge to which tall masts, a bowsprit, and other decorative elements have been added. Unlike earlier Gasparilla ships, the current pirate vessel has neither operable sails nor an engine, so on Gasparilla Day, it is guided through the flotilla of hundreds of private boats and watercraft by three tugboats under the direction of experienced harbor pilots. The Jose Gasparilla II has crossed Tampa Bay to lead every invasion since its launching except in 1971, when bad weather and rough seas canceled the flotilla, though not the parade.

For over half a century, various Gasparilla pirate ships would sail about half a mile up the Hillsborough River to Plant Park on the grounds of the University of Tampa, where members of YMKG would disembark for the parade. The construction of the Tampa Crosstown Expressway in 1976 ended that tradition, as the 100-foot (30 m) masts of the Jose Gasparilla II do not fit under the highway where it bridges the river near its mouth. Since 1992, the ship has made its way into Garrison Channel on Gasparilla Day to dock along the Tampa Riverwalk behind the Tampa Convention Center, where the pirate crew disembarks among thousands of revelers. Outside of Gasparilla season, the Jose Gasparilla II can usually be found moored near the northern end of Bayshore Boulevard within sight of downtown.

=== Historical Location and dates ===
==== Parade route ====
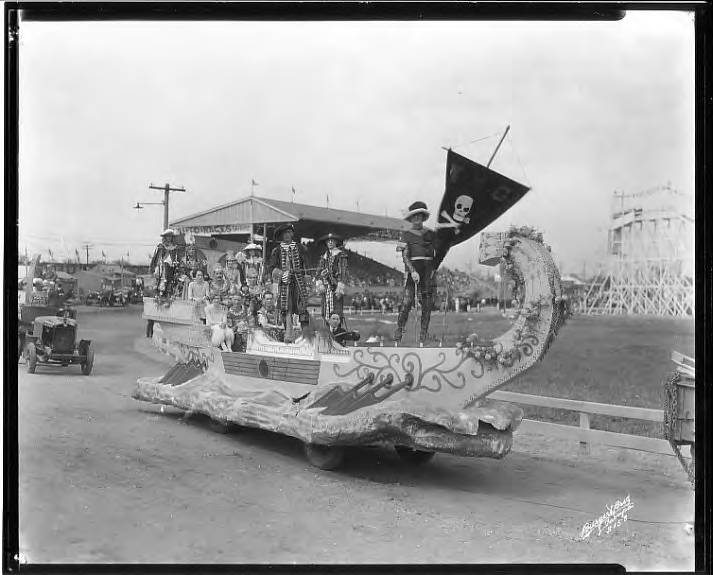
The 1925 parade concludes at the Plant Field track. Note Florida State Fair rides in background.

At least a portion of the Gasparilla Parade of Pirates has traversed Bayshore Boulevard near downtown almost since its inception. For several decades, the parade route ended at Plant Field where the Florida State Fair was taking place, drawing more attendees to the simultaneous events. The fair moved to much larger grounds east of Tampa in 1976, but the parade route has usually remained the same, traveling north up Bayshore Boulevard and ending in or near downtown, approximately 4.5 miles (7.2 km) in total. Since 2011, the parade route has concluded at Curtis Hixon Waterfront Park along the Tampa Riverwalk, where festivities continue into the evening.

Though their exact route varies slightly from year to year, the route of the Gasparilla Children's Parade is about half the length of the main parade route and runs along Bayshore Boulevard, while the main leg of the Krewe of San'Yago Illuminated Knight Parade runs down 7th Avenue in Ybor City.

==== Schedule ====
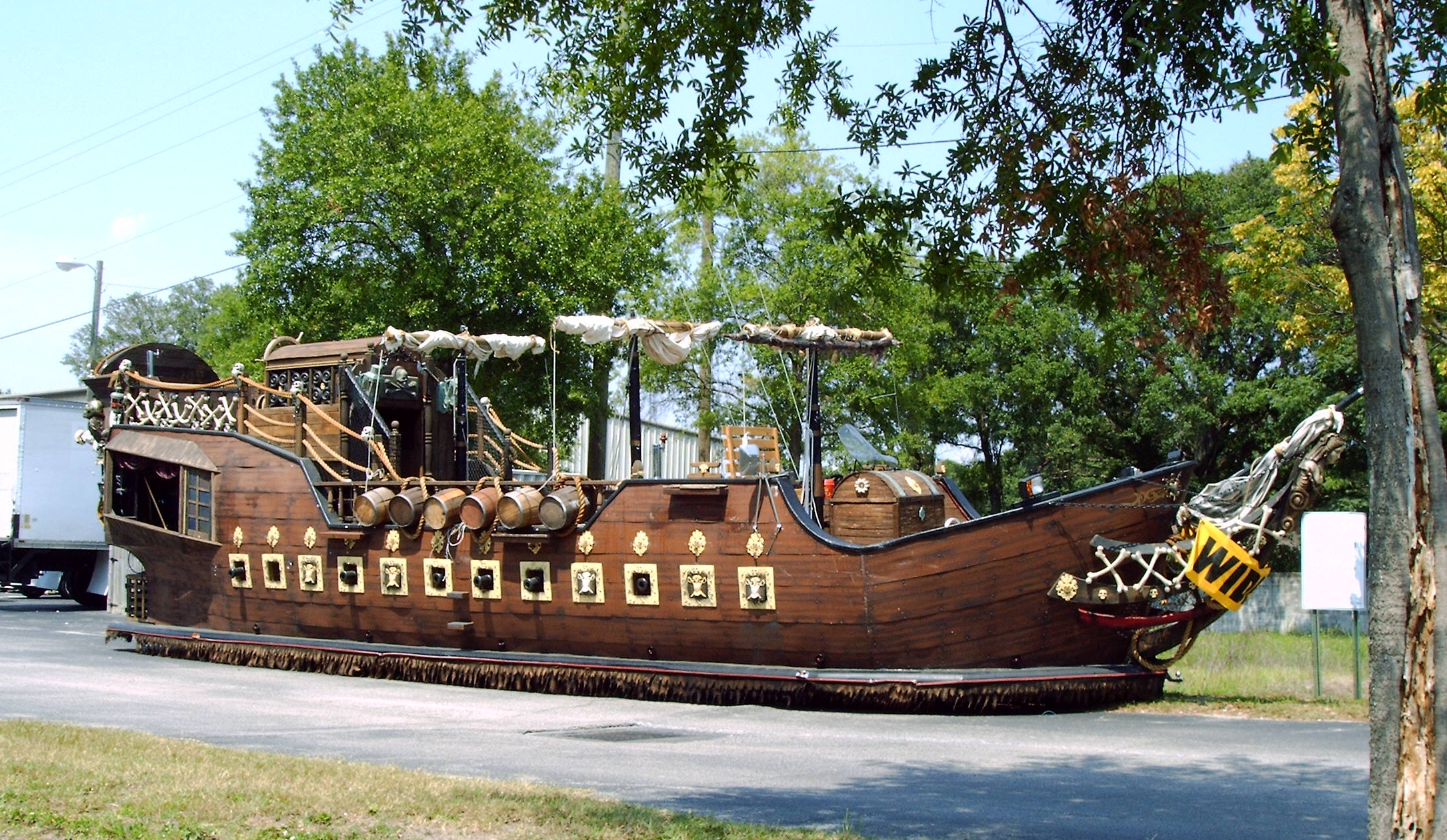
A float between events

The Gasparilla parade was held in conjunction with various other events in its early years, so its timing varied when it took place at all. The first mock invasion was held on May 4, 1904, and pirate-themed community festivities were held on dates ranging from February to November prior to World War I. The parade and related events were canceled during the involvement of the United States in the war, and when the festivities resumed in 1920, they were regularly scheduled for mid-February to coincide with the Florida State Fair. The Parade of Pirates went on another hiatus from 1942 through 1946 during World War II. When it returned in 1947, it was set for a Monday in mid-February, a tradition which lasted for almost four decades. Gasparilla Day became an official holiday in Hillsborough County during that period, with local schools and government offices closed for the festivities. In 1988, the Parade of Pirates was moved to the first Saturday in February so that out-of-towners could more easily take part. Since 2005, the parade has been held on the last Saturday in January except in 2021, when all major events of the Gasparilla Season were canceled due to the ongoing impact of the COVID-19 pandemic.

As the scheduling of the Parade of Pirates shifted over the years, the dates of the other two large parades of the season have generally shifted as well, with the Children's Parade held one week before and the Krewe of San'Yago Illuminated Knight Parade held two weeks after the main Gasparilla Parade.

=== YMKG integration / Super Bowl controversy ===
==== Background ====
The Parade of Pirates and related festivities have faced various criticisms over their long history, from complaints about unruly crowds and public drunkenness to observations that the tradition of local elites pretending to be a rapacious pirate crew plundering the city could be seen as problematic. Other criticism had its roots in the earliest iterations of the parade and the original organization behind the festival, and these critiques led to a controversy which gained national attention in the early 1990s.

Though Tampa was home to one of the largest and most prosperous Hispanic communities in the American South in the early 20th century, it was strictly racially segregated like the rest of the Deep South. Ye Mystic Krewe of Gasparilla was established by Tampa's business and civic elite during the depths of the Jim Crow era, and the private and somewhat secretive organization remained exclusively white and male even after most public segregation had been rolled back during the Civil Rights era.

The parade itself made small steps towards inclusion over the years. Female relatives of YMKG members formed the Krewe of Venus in 1966 and were allowed to participate in the Gasparilla Parade the following year. Leading members of Tampa's Latin community formed the Krewe of the Knights of Sant' Yago in 1972 and organized their own parade in Ybor City beginning in 1974. However, though they could participate as spectators, African-Americans and others among Tampa's diverse population remained excluded from YMKG and direct participation.

By the 1980s, local minority organizations were publicly pointing out that exclusion from YMKG symbolized their continued exclusion from Tampa's top social and economic circles, as membership largely overlapped that other local organizations such as the Chamber of Commerce and key yacht and country clubs. An invitation to join YMKG did not only allow the invitee to dress like a pirate for the parade; it was a sign that they had "arrived in the community". As former Tampa mayor Bob Buckhorn later reflected, "You had this huge ... public debate about the role of the Krewe of Gasparilla, but the larger issue was making sure that everyone had a seat at the table, particularly African Americans."

==== 1991 cancelation and replacement ====
This simmering issue grew into a heated controversy in 1990. Tampa and YMKG had agreed to stage the 1991 Parade of Pirates a week earlier than usual to coincide with Super Bowl XXV, which was to be played in Tampa Stadium in January. As planning commenced in 1990, local chapters of the NAACP and the Urban League made use of the international media's focus on the Super Bowl to highlight YMKG's segregated membership, causing the city and the National Football League to pressure the Krewe to admit its first African-American members.

While claiming that it was not a racist organization and was open to accepting Black members, YMKG argued in September 1990 that it was "too late" to expand its membership before the 1991 parade and canceled Parade of Pirates instead. The city of Tampa hastily put together a replacement parade called "Bamboleo", which was billed as a "multicultural festival" and did not have a pirate theme. Rainy weather helped to dampen the crowds for the event, which some observers considered a "flop" while others hailed it as a step toward a more inclusive local community.

Later in 1991, YMKG admitted two Black members and agreed to allow additional krewes to join the main Gasparilla Parade. The Parade of Pirates returned in 1992 with an expanded participant list that better reflected the community's population.

==== 2001 "Supersized" Gasparilla ====
When Tampa hosted Super Bowl XXXV in 2001, the parade moved to the Saturday before the game as planned a decade before, and an integrated Krewe of Gasparilla was joined by over thirty other krewes before a record crowd of 750,000. Though "Supersized Gasparilla" was well received and was seen as a sign of the community's social progress, the city has opted not to repeat the schedule change when hosting subsequent Super Bowls due to the serious challenges posed by large crowds and snarled traffic across downtown and South Tampa.

==== Later developments ====
The number of krewes and other participating civic organizations has continued to grow in recent years, dampening controversies over inclusion. Due to practical concerns, participation in the Parade of Pirates is limited to fifty krewes per year, with smaller krewes taking turns on a rotating basis.
