= Tampa Riverwalk =

Open space and pedestrian trail in Florida

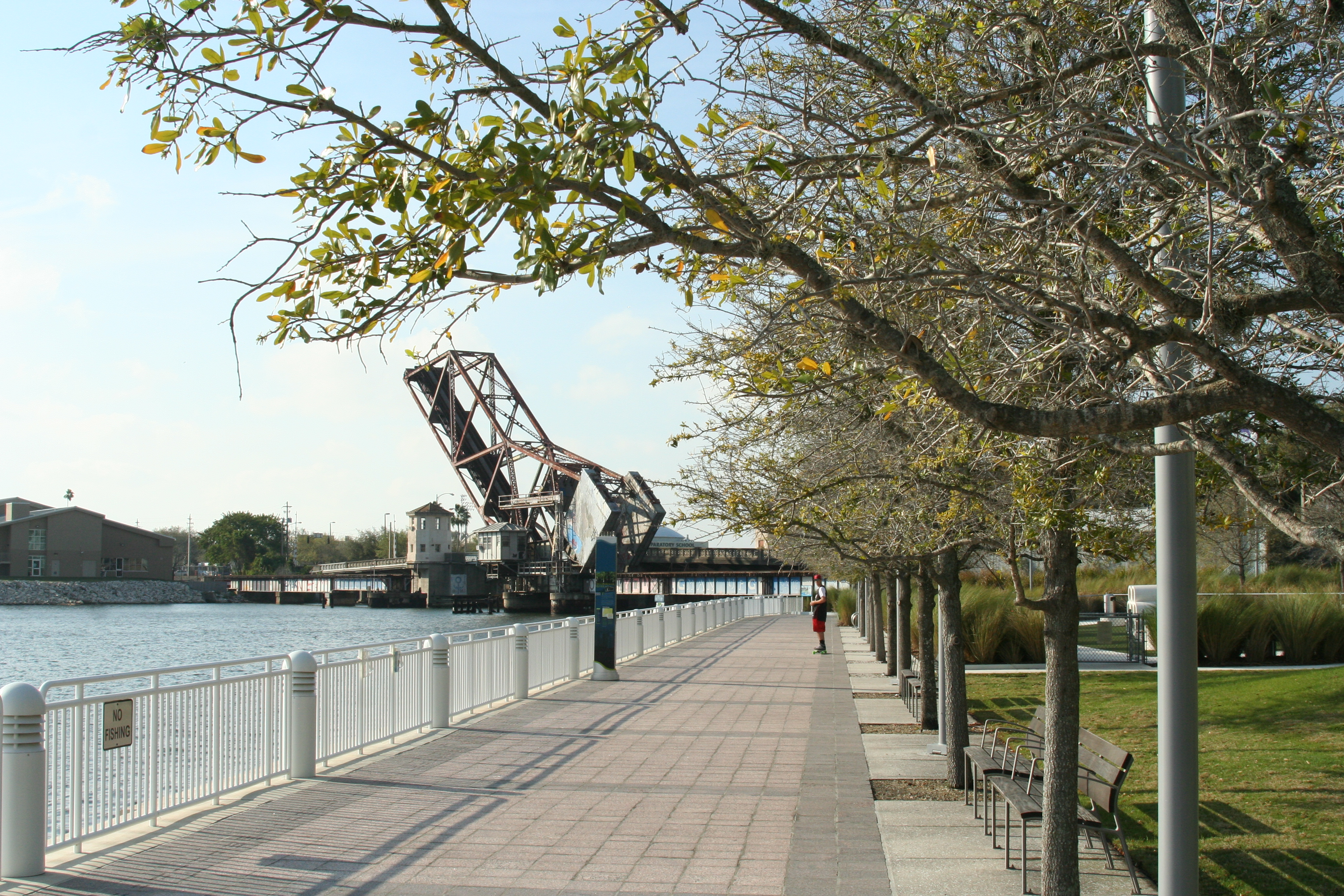
- A section of Tampa's Riverwalk along the Hillsborough River and Curtis Hixon Park

- Location within Florida
- Location: Tampa, Florida
- Coordinates: 27°56′41″N 82°27′32″W
- Established: 1989
- Open: Year round
- Public transit: TECO Line Streetcar
- Website: thetampariverwalk.com

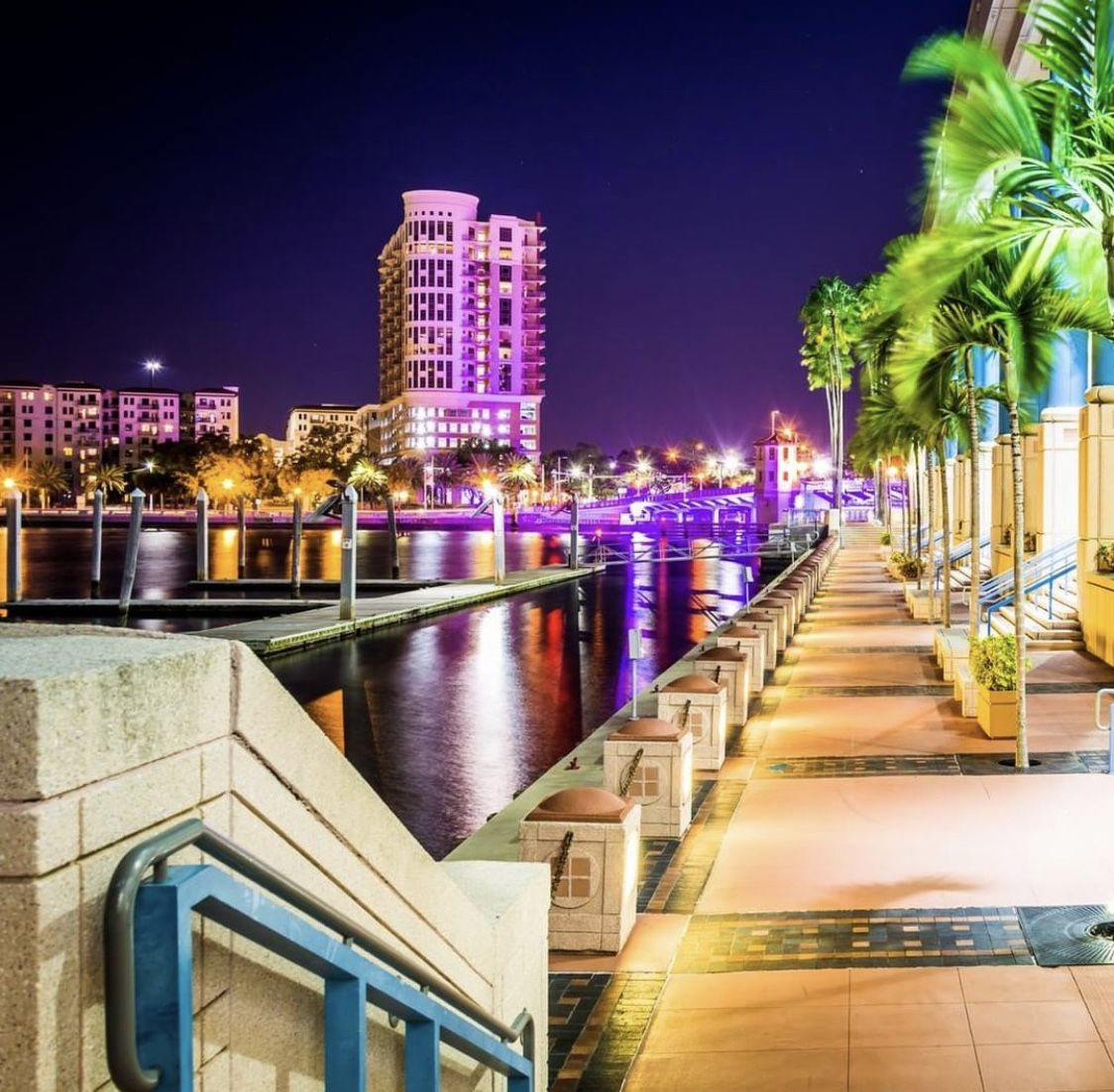
The Tampa Riverwalk looking towards the mouth of the Hillsborough River beside the Tampa Convention Center

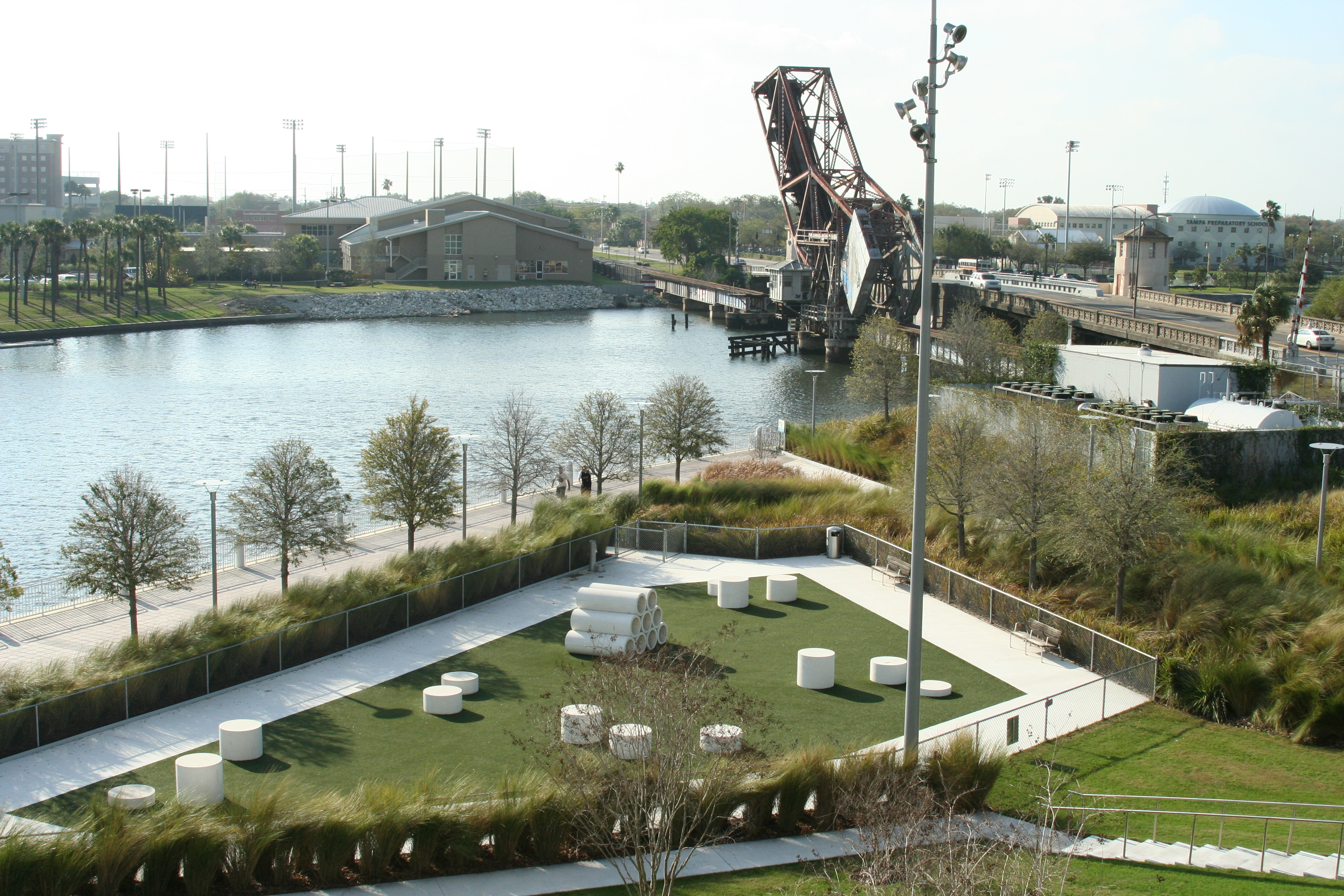
A dog park along Tampa's Riverwalk and the Hillsborough River

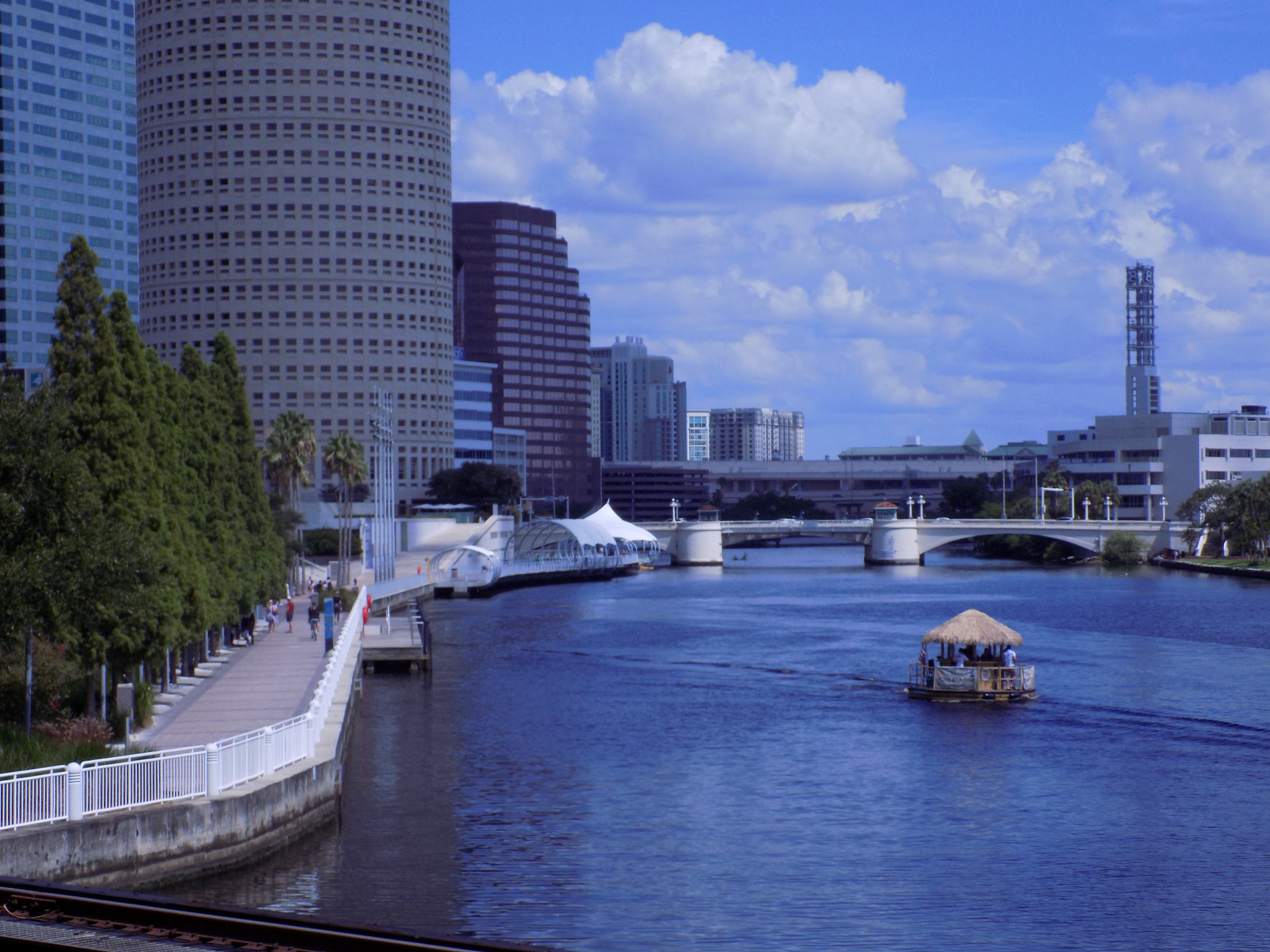
The Riverwalk (left) and Hillsborough River seen looking south from the Cass Street Bridge

The Tampa Riverwalk is a 2.6-mile-long (4.2 km) open space and pedestrian trail along the Hillsborough River in Tampa, Florida. The Riverwalk extends along most of the downtown Tampa waterfront from the Channelside District on the eastern terminus to the mouth of the Hillsborough River and then north along the riverside to Tampa Heights, forming a continuous path that connects a multitude of parks, attractions, public spaces, and hotels. Among the notable points of interest along the Riverwalk are the Tampa Bay History Center, Benchmark International Arena, the Tampa Convention Center, Rivergate Tower, Curtis Hixon Waterfront Park, Water Works Park, and the Waterfront Arts District which includes the Tampa Museum of Art, Florida Museum of Photographic Arts, Glazer Children's Museum, and the Straz Center for the Performing Arts. Locations along the Riverwalk play host to many community events, most notably the numerous festivals held at Curtis Hixon Park and the arrival of the "pirate ship" Jose Gasparilla, which moors at the Riverwalk behind the Convention Center during the Gasparilla Pirate Festival.

According to the city, the purpose of the Riverwalk is to "enhance the image of Tampa as a beautiful and unique destination" and highlight Tampa's waterfront.

== Origin and description ==
Tampa's Riverwalk has its origins in the 1970s, when much of the downtown waterfront consisted of aging warehouses and industrial facilities related to the nearby Port of Tampa. Tampa mayor Bill Poe conceived the idea of a park and walkway behind Curtis Hixon Hall, a civic center along the Hillsborough River that was one of the few public spaces in the area. The city built a short stretch of boardwalk on the east side of the river behind the Hall, but a lack of funds to buy adjoining properties and subsequent mayors' disinterest in the project paused further construction. Tampa renewed its push to revitalize its "desolate" downtown in the mid-1980s, and over the next decade, obsolete Curtis Hixon Hall was replaced by a riverside park and the Tampa Convention Center, Benchmark International Arena, and the Florida Aquarium were constructed with mostly public funds along the waterfront. However, change was limited by many underutilized spaces and poor transportation options inside the downtown area.

In 2002, mayoral candidate Pam Iorio pledged to jumpstart the Riverwalk project if elected. She won, and construction soon began on two parks behind Benchmark International Arena and a connecting pathway along the Garrison Channel. The Riverwalk progressed in phases over the next few years with funds from the city, a $20 million fundraising campaign, and occasional state and federal grants. The project reached a significant milestone in 2010 when Curtis Hixon Waterfront Park, a new Tampa Museum of Art, and the Glazer Children's Museum all opened near the location of the original 1970s boardwalk, which had been replaced by the widest portion of the modern Riverwalk directly across the river from the University of Tampa. Bob Buckhorn, who succeeded Iorio as Tampa's mayor, was a strong advocate for downtown redevelopment and continued the push to expand the Riverwalk. In 2014, a federal transportation grant was used to complete a $9.2 million boardwalk under the Kennedy Boulevard bridge, connecting all existing segments into one continuous path about two miles long. A further northward extension completed in 2016 stretched the path past the Straz Center for the Performing Arts and under Interstate 275 to newly opened Waterworks Park in the adjoining neighborhood of Tampa Heights, bringing the total length of the Riverwalk to 2.6 miles (4.2 km).

Upon completion, Tampa's Riverwalk quickly became both a community gathering place and a busy non-vehicular corridor connecting various downtown attractions and hotels. Besides pedestrian traffic, bicycles and motorized scooters are available for rent at many stations along the path, and a water taxi provides service between the Riverwalk and nearby areas such as Hyde Park, West Tampa, Harbour Island, and Davis Islands. In addition, the TECO Line Streetcar runs parallel to the Riverwalk along the Garrison Channel and provides a connection to the interior of downtown and the nearby historic neighborhood of Ybor City.

== Future plans ==
In 2022, the city announced plans to develop new segments of the Riverwalk along the west side of the Hillsborough River, across from the existing path. The west bank addition would stretch north into the neighborhood of West Tampa and would be connected to a "Green Spine" of pedestrian and bike-friendly greenways and protected lanes that extend into areas well away from the river, adding an additional 6 miles (9.7 km) to the combined project and creating a large loop.

== Public art ==
In recent years, the city has installed a color-changing LED lighting system along portions of the Riverwalk to add nighttime color to the path and nearby bridges. It is specially lit for various events, such as green and gold for University of South Florida commencement ceremonies and blue for Tampa Bay Lightning games.

=== Historical Monument Trail ===
In 2012, commissions for six $15,000 bronze busts of prominent figures from the History of Tampa were secured by the Friends of the Riverwalk with sculptor Steven Dickey. Nine historians including, former Tampa Tribune reporter Leland Hawes and Tampa Bay History Center curator Rodney Kite-Powell, made the selections. The first honorees were:

- Vicente Martinez Ybor, cigar manufacturer and founder of Ybor City
- Henry B. Plant, railroad developer and builder of the Tampa Bay Hotel
- Eleanor McWilliams Chamberlain, leader of Florida's women's suffrage movement
- Clara C. Frye, founder of Tampa's first non-segregated hospital
- James McKay Sr., key mayor of Tampa
- the Mocoso, Tocobaga, and Pohoy indigenous peoples

Additional honorees have been selected and busts added along the Riverwalk in subsequent years. As of 2022, a total of thirty historical figures have been honored. Among them are:

- Frank Adamo, leading local doctor and medical advocate for POWs as fellow prisoner during World War 2
- Cyril Blythe Andrews, prominent local minister, civil rights advocate, and publisher of the Florida Sentinel Bulletin newspaper
- Blanche Armwood, educator and community leader
- Elizabeth D. Barnard, first female postmaster of Tampa
- Meroba Hooker Crane, businesswoman and owner of the first hotel in Tampa, the Orange Grove Inn; key preserver of Oaklawn Cemetery
- Edward Daniel Davis, local educator and civil rights advocate
- Cody Fowler, local attorney and civil rights advocate
- Herman Glogowski, community leader and first Jewish mayor of Tampa
- Gavino Gutierrez, civil engineer who urged Vicente Ybor to locate in Tampa; early developer of Ybor City
- Ossian B. Hart, governor of Florida and noted civil rights advocate during the Reconstruction era
- Ignacio Haya, friendly competitor to Vicente Martinez-Ybor whose factory rolled Ybor City's first cigars
- Kate V. Jackson businesswoman, philanthropist, environmentalist, and local leader
- Peter O. Knight, key local politician and attorney during Tampa's early development period
- Bena Wolf Maas, businesswoman, civic leader, and humanitarian
- Hugh Campbell Macfarlane, attorney, businessman, and developer of West Tampa
- Victoriano Manteiga, popular lector in Ybor City's cigar factories and founder of La Gaceta, the nation's last published tri-lingual newspaper
- Benjamin Elijah Mays, nationally known educator and mentor of Martin Luther King Jr.; leader of the Tampa Urban League in the 1920s
- Paulina Pedroso, activist for Cuban independence and civil rights leader
- Francisco Aristides Rodriguez Jr., prominent lawyer advocating for fair treatment for African Americans in Florida's criminal justice system; leader of local NAACP and La Union Marti-Maceo
- Garfield Devoe Rogers, businessman, philanthropist and developer of Rogers Park
- Norma Tina Russo, former prima donna from Italy who became a strong advocate for the arts in Tampa
- Stephen M. Sparkman, first member of the US House of Representatives from Tampa; instrumental in securing federal support for the development of the Port of Tampa
- Moses White, businessman, community leader and philanthropist
- Mack R. Winton, prominent local surgeon; worked with Clara C. Frye to establish an unsegregated hospital, then hospital for members of El Centro Español de Tampa

=== Other art ===
In 2016, the city of Tampa commissioned a lenticular mural to be placed underneath the Laurel Street Bridge by the Hillsborough River. The mural was created by RE:site, Metalab, Designtex, and PolyVision and is titled "Woven Waves." "Woven Waves" is designed to evoke the concept of a quilt, inspired by the currents of the river and the diverse cultural makeup of Tampa.
