= Curtis Hixon =

American politician

45th Mayor of Tampa
- In office November 3, 1943 – May 21, 1956
- Preceded by: Robert E. Lee Chancey
- Succeeded by: Junie L. Young Jr.

Member of the Tampa City Council
- In office 1939–1943

Member of the Board of County Commissioners of Hillsborough County
- In office 1929–1939

Personal details
- Born: November 23, 1891 Louisville, Alabama, U.S.
- Died: May 21, 1956 (aged 64) Tampa, Florida, U.S.

Military service
- Allegiance: United States of America
- Branch/service: Navy
- Rank: Pharmacist's mate
- Battles/wars: World War I

Curtis Hixon (November 23, 1891 – May 21, 1956) was mayor of Tampa, Florida, from November 1943 until his death in 1956.

== Early life ==
Hixon was born and raised in Louisville, Alabama. Hixon studied pharmacology at the School of Pharmacy in Atlanta, Georgia (now a part of Mercer University). In 1914, Hixon would move to Tampa, Florida, becoming a pharmacist there with his older brother Marvin. During World War I he joined the US Navy serving as a Pharmacist's mate. After World War I he came back to Tampa and bought a drugstore located on Franklin Street.

== Political involvement ==
He was elected to the Tampa City Council in 1929, serving until his resignation in 1937. In 1939, Hixon was elected to the Hillsborough County Commission serving until 1943 when he successfully ran to be the Mayor of Tampa. Curtis won the office of mayor in his first election by the highest margin in Tampa history and went on to serve 3 more terms before his death.

=== Mayor of Tampa ===
When Curtis assumed office, Tampa was facing issues because of World War II's rationing and a host of others but did benefit from military contracts. Another significant issue during his first term was with Tampa's city government not being able to collect enough money. In response, Hixon would end tax adjustments, increase tax auditing and collecting overdue taxes. After the end of World War, Tampa would expand greatly. Drew Field after being deactivated would be transferred over to the city government in October 1947 later becoming Tampa International Airport.

During 1947 the municipal government would purchase former industrial facilities located at Hooker's Point and expanded the point itself physically. In 1949, the city charter would be revised giving the mayor more power and responsibilities. Sulfur Springs and the area surrounding Rocky Point would be annexed in 1953.

== Death ==
Hixon was rushed to the hospital on May 11, 1956, after contracting pneumonia. He died of heart failure ten days later on May 21.

== Legacy ==
Curtis Hixon Waterfront Park is named for him, as well as Curtis Hixon Hall before it was demolished in 1993.

== See also ==
- List of mayors of Tampa, Florida
