= Glazer Children's Museum =

Coordinates: 27.949573°N 82.461527°W

- Former name: Kid City, Children's Museum of Tampa
- Established: 1986
- Location: 110 W. Gasparilla Plaza; Tampa, Florida
- Type: Children's museum
- President: Sarah Cole
- Website: https://glazermuseum.org/

The Glazer Children's Museum is a non-profit children's museum located in downtown Tampa, Florida, next to the Tampa Museum of Art and Curtis Hixon Waterfront Park, alongside the Tampa Riverwalk. It is part of the Downtown River Arts neighborhood.

Housed in a 53,000-square-foot facility in downtown Tampa, the museum features interactive exhibits in multiple themed areas. Traveling exhibits occasionally supplement the museum's permanent collection as well.

== History ==
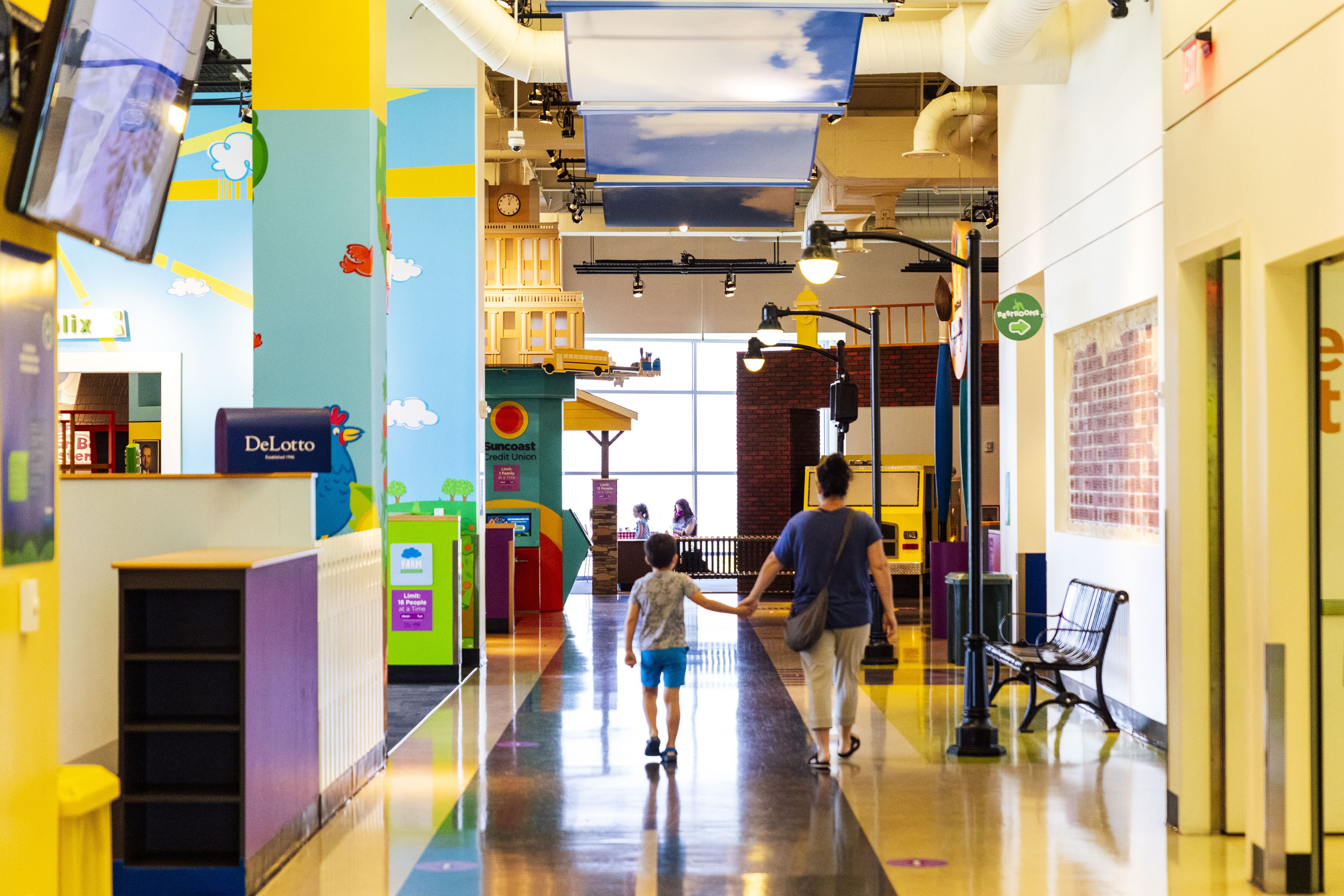
Level 2 of Glazer Children's Museum

The history of Glazer Children's Museum dates back to the 1965 opening of Safety Village in Lowry Park.

The Children's Museum of Tampa, Inc. was founded in 1986 by community volunteers and with support of many private and public partners. The Children's Museum of Tampa served children and families in the Tampa Bay Area for over two decades. From humble beginnings in a small storefront location, the museum provided exhibits that gave children a safe place to learn and play.

In 1989, with support from the City of Tampa, the museum relocated next to the city zoo. This site operated under the name Kid City and consisted of a series of outdoor miniature buildings simulating a small town. From 1989 to 2003, Kid City was an ideal space for the museum to provide curriculum centered on the value of community. Kid City served over 750,000 visitors from the Tampa Bay Area and became an important part of the cultural and educational fabric of the community.

In 2003, museum volunteers and staff began looking at the next step of expansion to meet the needs of its community. After conducting a feasibility study and gathering input from more than 400 people, plans were drawn for a new 53,000-square-foot state-of-the-art children's museum in downtown Tampa's new Curtis Hixon Waterfront Park. After a $22 million capital campaign to build the new building, construction began in March 2009 and was completed in April 2010, the museum was then opened on September 25, 2010. In honor of the Glazer Family Foundation, who had donated $5 million, the Museum was named as Glazer Children's Museum. In its first year of operation, the museum served 250,000 guests, donated more than 25,000 admission tickets to underserved youth populations, and saw approximately 26,000 children during school field trips and educational programs.

Since its opening in 2010, Glazer Children's Museum has hosted more than two million guests and is an integral part of the cultural corridor of museums, libraries, theaters, and performing arts centers in Tampa Bay.

== Big John fossil ==
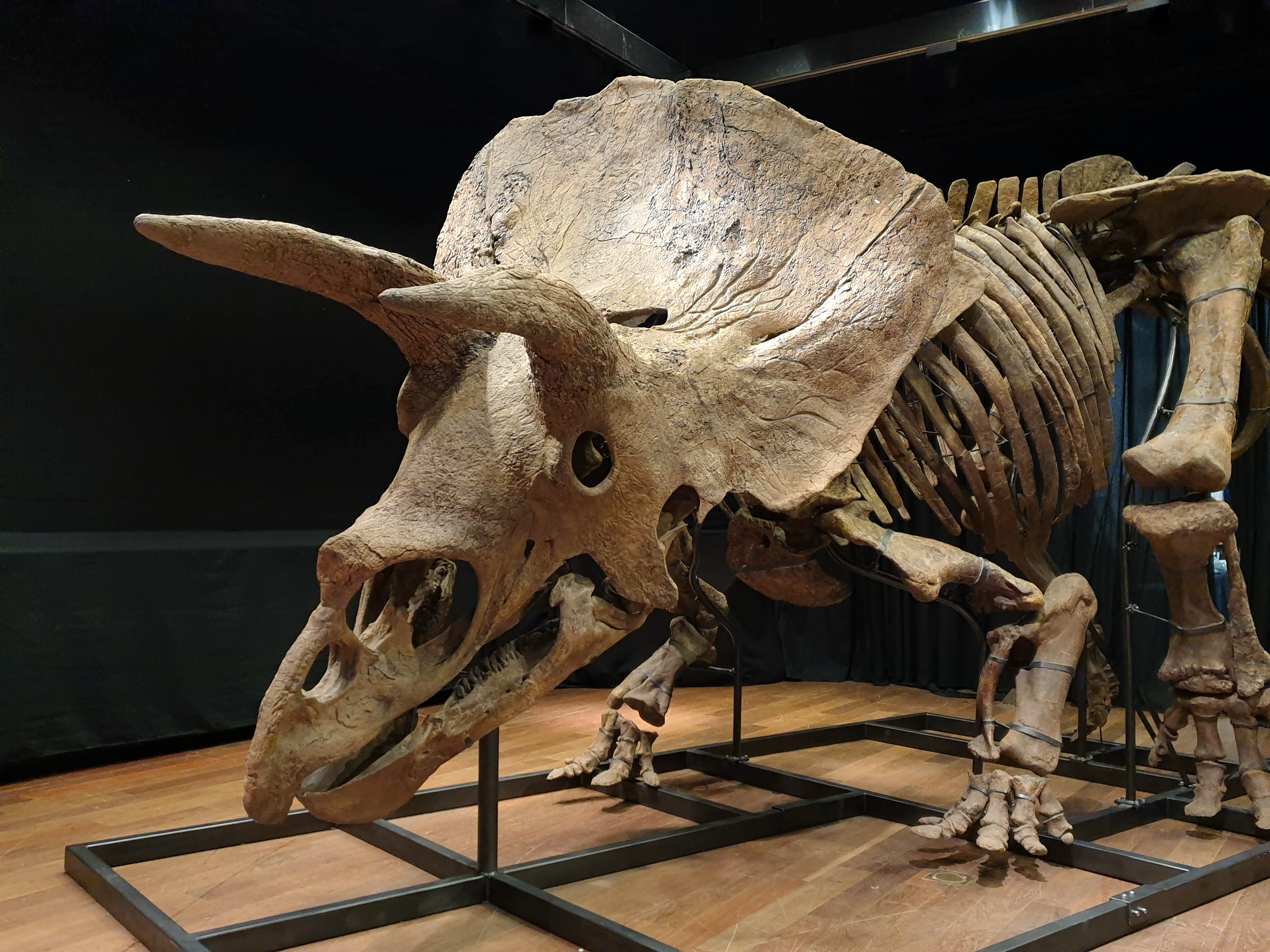
Big John on display in Paris in October 2021.

In January 2023, the museum announced it would host a three-year public exhibition of Big John, a fossilized Triceratops, on loan for Tampa-based businessman Siddhartha Pagidipati. Upon its arrival, the fossil was reconstructed in less than a week and displayed at the museum's annual gala on February 3, 2023. The museum announced that it would end its rule prohibiting adults from attending the museum without accompanying children. The Big John exhibition, including an interactive hands-on play area, opened on May 26, 2023.

== Awards and Accolades ==
- 2012 - Recipient of Educational Outreach Award from WEDU Be More Awards
- 2015 - Recipient of Educational Outreach Award from WEDU Be More Awards
- 2016 - Recipient of Diversity and Inclusion Award from FL Division of Cultural Affairs
- 2017 - Non-Profit of the Year: Arts, Culture and Humanities from Tampa Bay Business Journal
- 2017 - Finalist in the WEDU Be More Awards
- 2019 - Finalist in the Tampa Downtown Partnership Urban Excellence Awards
- 2019 - Finalist in the WEDU Be More Awards
- 2019 - Best Place to Have a Birthday Party from Tampa Bay Times Best of the Best Awards
- 2019 - Employer of the Year from Mayor's Alliance for Persons with Disabilities
- 2019 - Marketer of the Year from AMA Tampa Bay
- 2019 - Non-Profit of the Year Honoree from TBBJ ONE Tampa Bay
- 2020 - Finalist: Best International Digital Activity from Kids in Museums]
