= Curtis Hixon Waterfront Park =

Public park in downtown Tampa, Florida

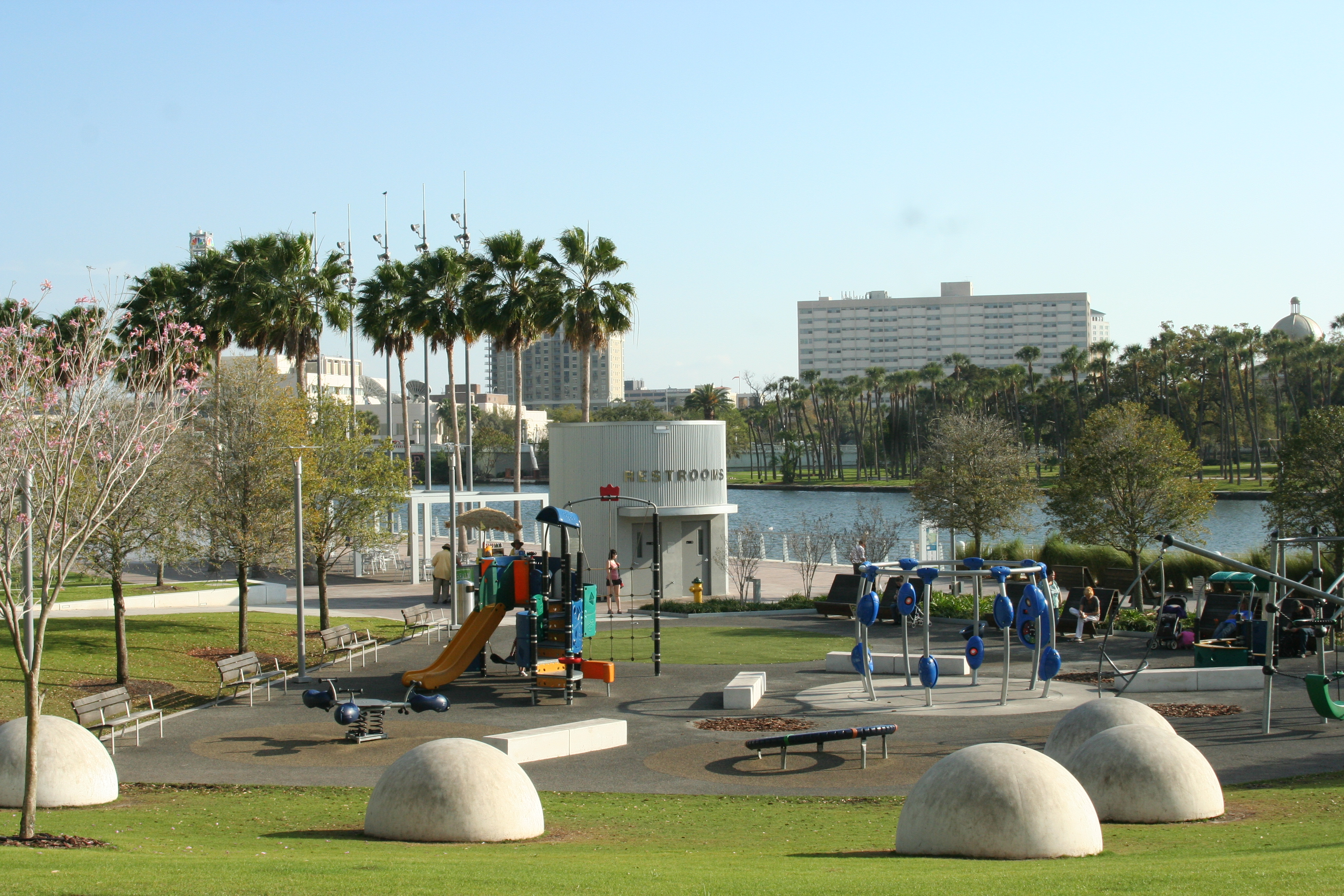
- Playground area and kiosk
- Interactive map of Curtis Hixon Waterfront Park
- Location: Tampa, Florida
- Coordinates: 27°56′56″N 82°27′42″W
- Area: 8 acres (3.2 ha)
- Opened: 2010
- Open: Year round
- Website: thetampariverwalk.com

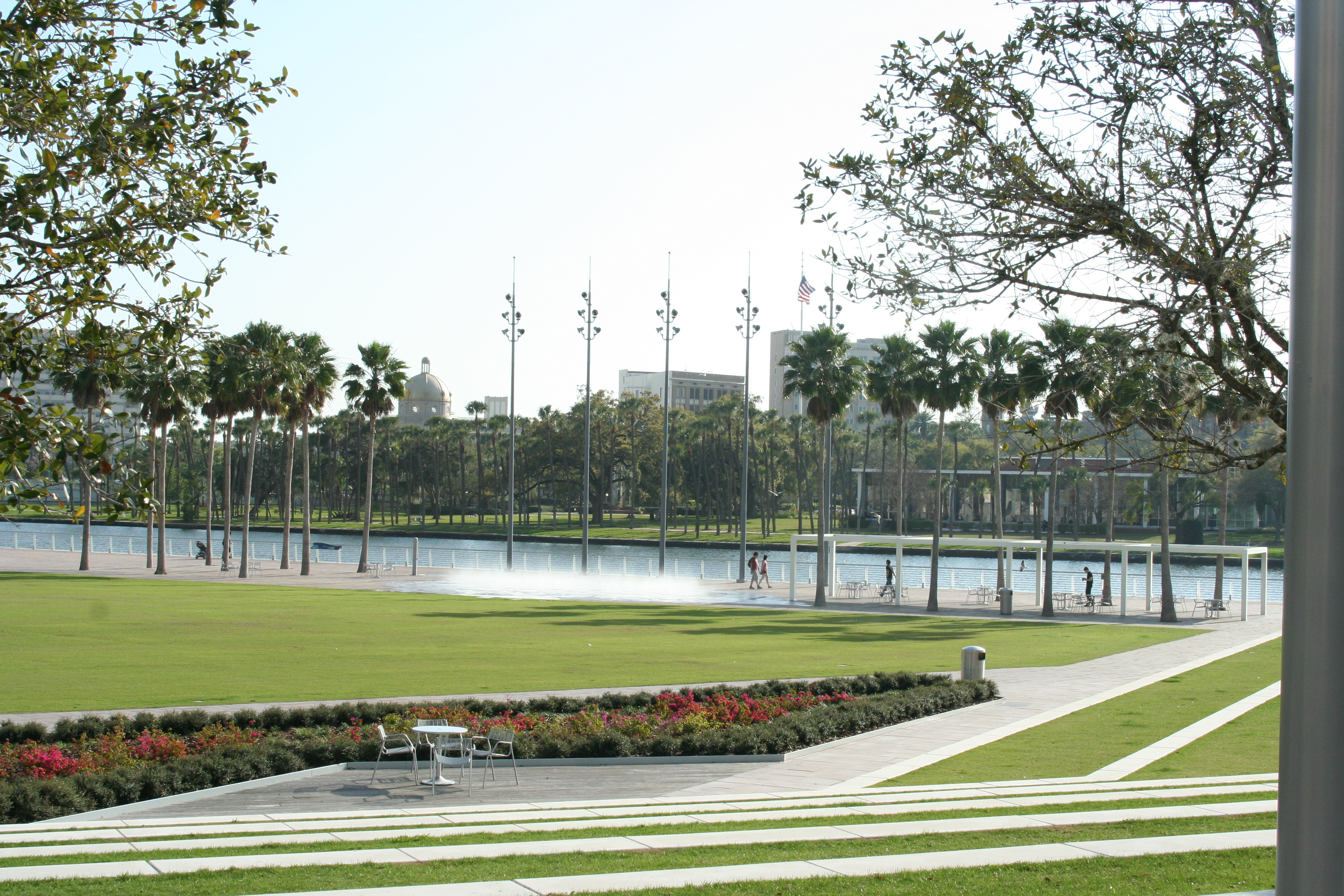
View looking southwest across Curtis Hixon Waterfront Park and the Hillsborough River

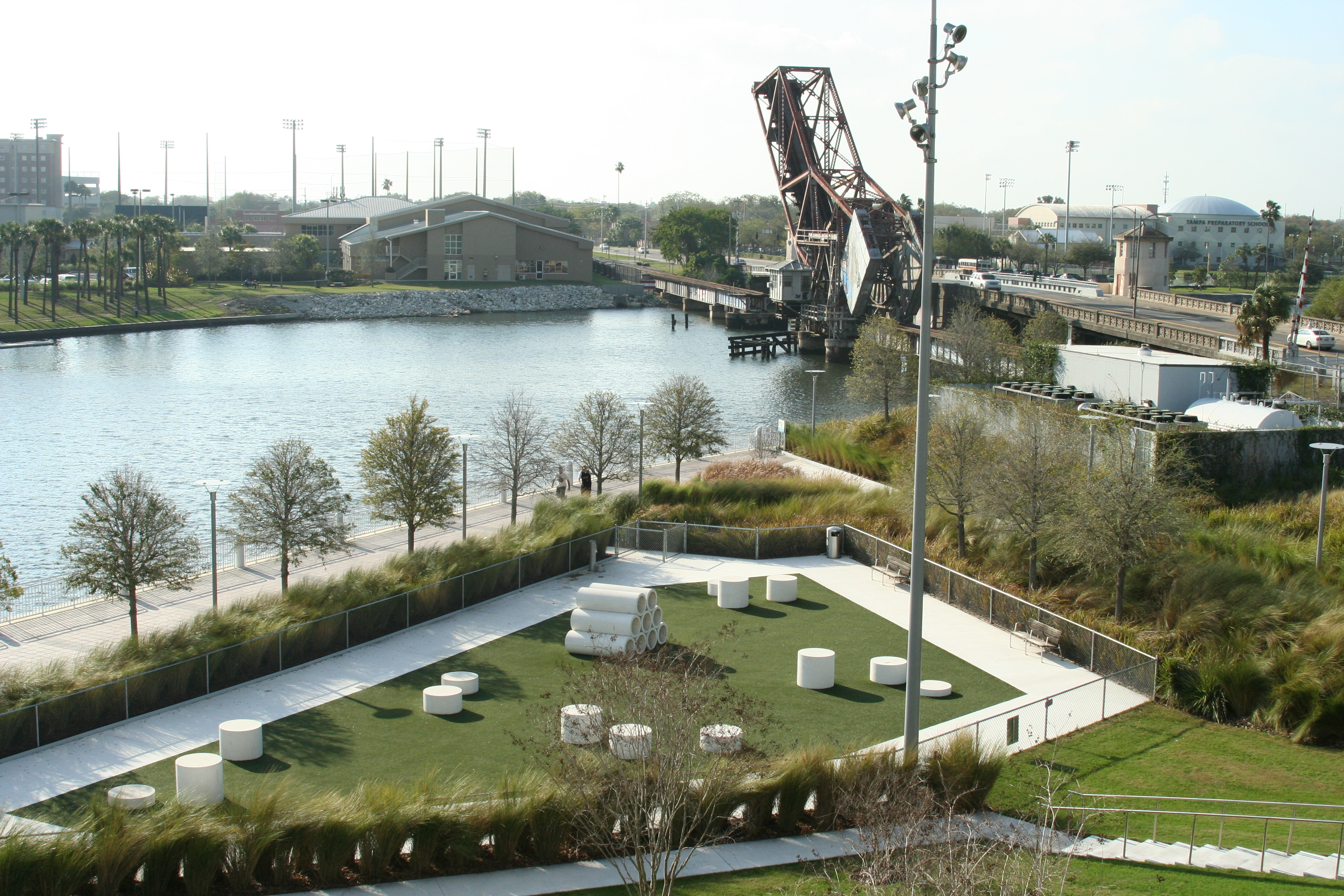
View of the dog park at the northwest corner of Curtis Hixon Waterfront Park taken from the Tampa Museum of Art

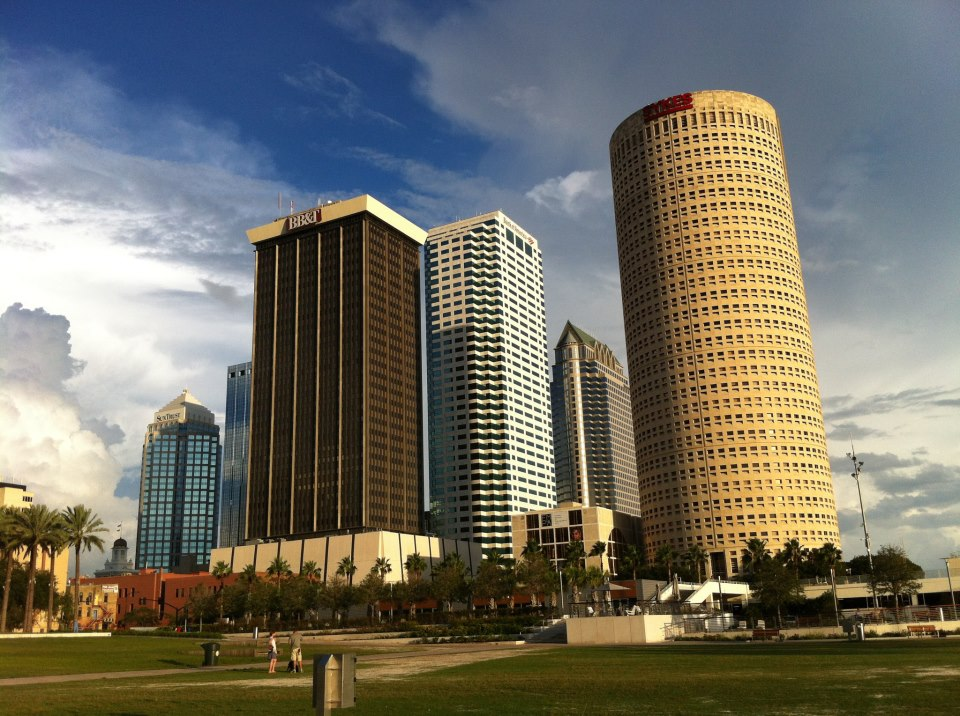
A view of Tampa's downtown skyline looking southeast across Curtis Hixon Waterfront Park

Curtis Hixon Waterfront Park is an 8 acres (3.2 ha) public park located along the Hillsborough river in downtown Tampa, Florida that opened in its current configuration in 2010. It is adjacent to the Tampa Riverwalk, Florida Museum of Photographic Arts, Tampa Museum of Art, Glazer Children's Museum, and Rivergate Tower. The park overlooks the University of Tampa's Plant Hall, which is directly across the river. The park is in an area known as the Waterfront Arts District.

== Description ==
Much of Curtis Hixon Waterfront Park consists of an open grassy lawn that slopes gently towards the river in a series of wide terraces. Around this greenspace are several fountains, a large playground, a public boat dock, a dog park, several shaded pavilions, an amphitheater, various sculptures, a garden area designed by Dan Kiley, and a small concession kiosk with restrooms. The park is bordered by the Tampa Museum of Art and the Glazer Children's Museum on the north, Ashley Drive on the east, and the Rivergate Tower and parking garage to the south. On the west side of the park is the Hillsborough River and the Tampa Riverwalk, a 2.4 mile long walkway which connects Curtis Hixon Park to several attractions and facilities (including the Tampa Convention Center and the Straz Center for the Performing Arts), many hotels and restaurants, and a series of smaller parks along Tampa's downtown waterfront.

Curtis Hixon Waterfront Park regularly hosts a wide variety of events large and small, including concerts and music festivals, food festivals, arts and crafts shows, evening yoga classes, temporary ice skating, and many other activities. Though relatively new, the public space has become a popular local destination and has been called "Tampa's town square".

== History ==
Curtis Hixon Waterfront Park is located adjacent to the former site of Curtis Hixon Hall, Tampa's first convention center and general purpose indoor arena which was built in 1965. Both the park and the former building were named for Curtis Hixon, a mayor of Tampa who died while in office in 1956.

After Curtis Hixon Hall was made obsolete by newer facilities and demolished in 1993, the original Curtis Hixon Park was built on the site. This small park was not widely utilized due to a poor connection to both the river and the rest of downtown, few amenities, and a lack of other things to do in downtown Tampa during evenings and weekends.

By the early 2000s, Tampa's long-planned Riverwalk project began taking shape. The city razed the old Tampa Museum of Art building and its adjoining parking garage, which had hemmed in Curtis Hixon Park on the south and limited public access to the riverfront. A new art museum building plus the Glazer Children's Museum were constructed on the north side of the park, while the old park was greatly expanded to the south and was completely reconfigured by landscape architect Thomas Balsley to allow for open views from Ashley Boulevard across to the Hillsborough River and the University of Tampa beyond. The park opened in its current configuration in 2010.
