= Water Works Park (Tampa, Florida) =

Park in Tampa, Florida

Coordinates: 27.9592°N 82.4631°W

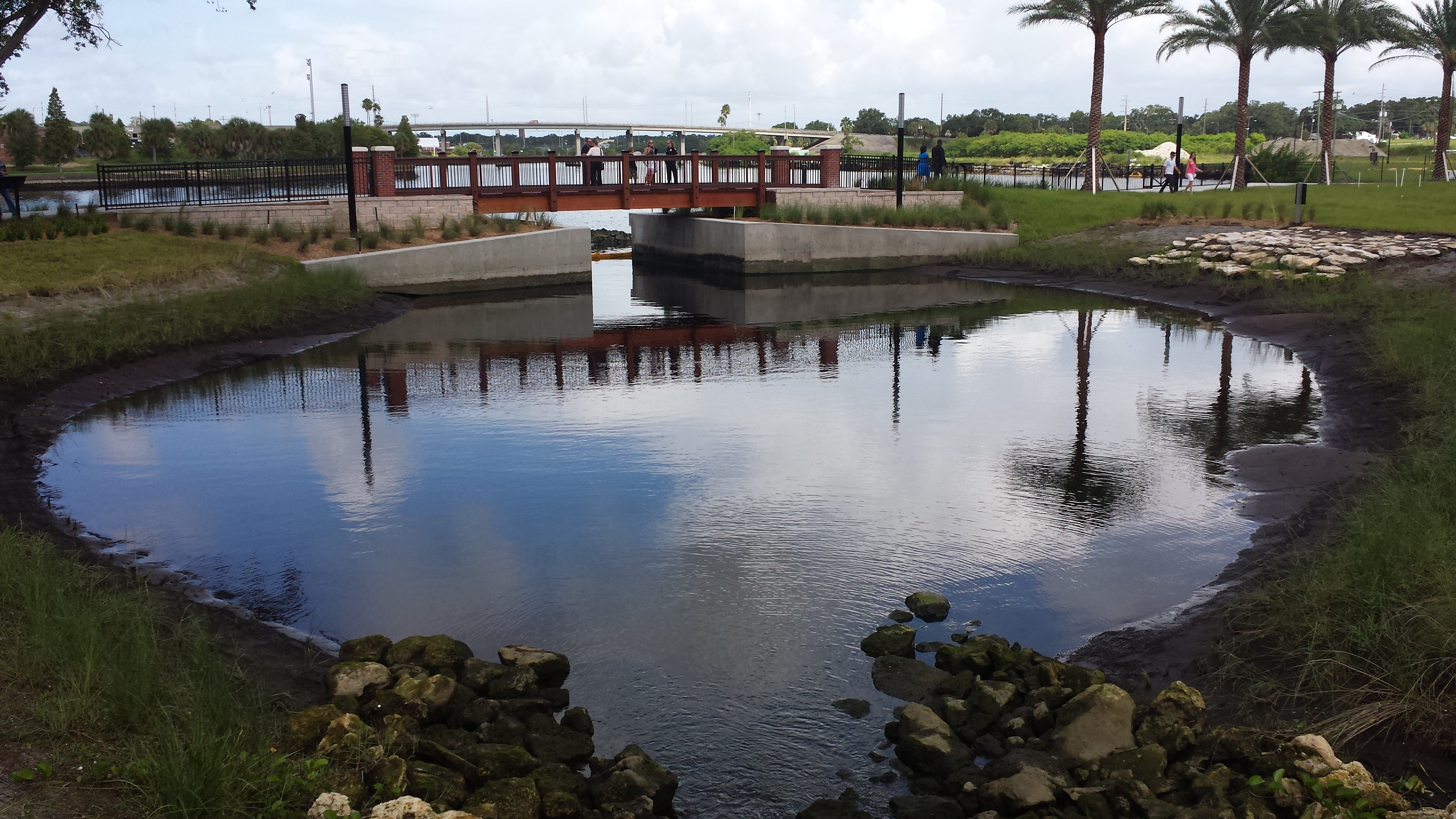

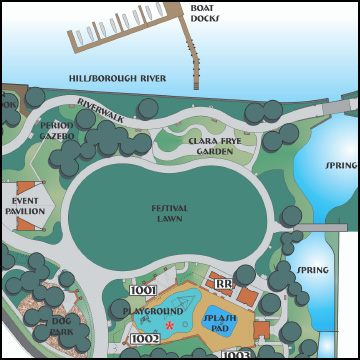

Water Works Park is a park area in Tampa, Florida. The park was redeveloped and opened to the public in August 2014. The park includes a section of the Tampa Riverwalk, and extended alongside the Hillsborough River.

The park has an open lawn, children's splash pad and playground, amphitheater and dog park. A memorial garden honoring Clara Frye was built at the park. The Ulele Spring has been restored to flow freely into the Hillsborough River.

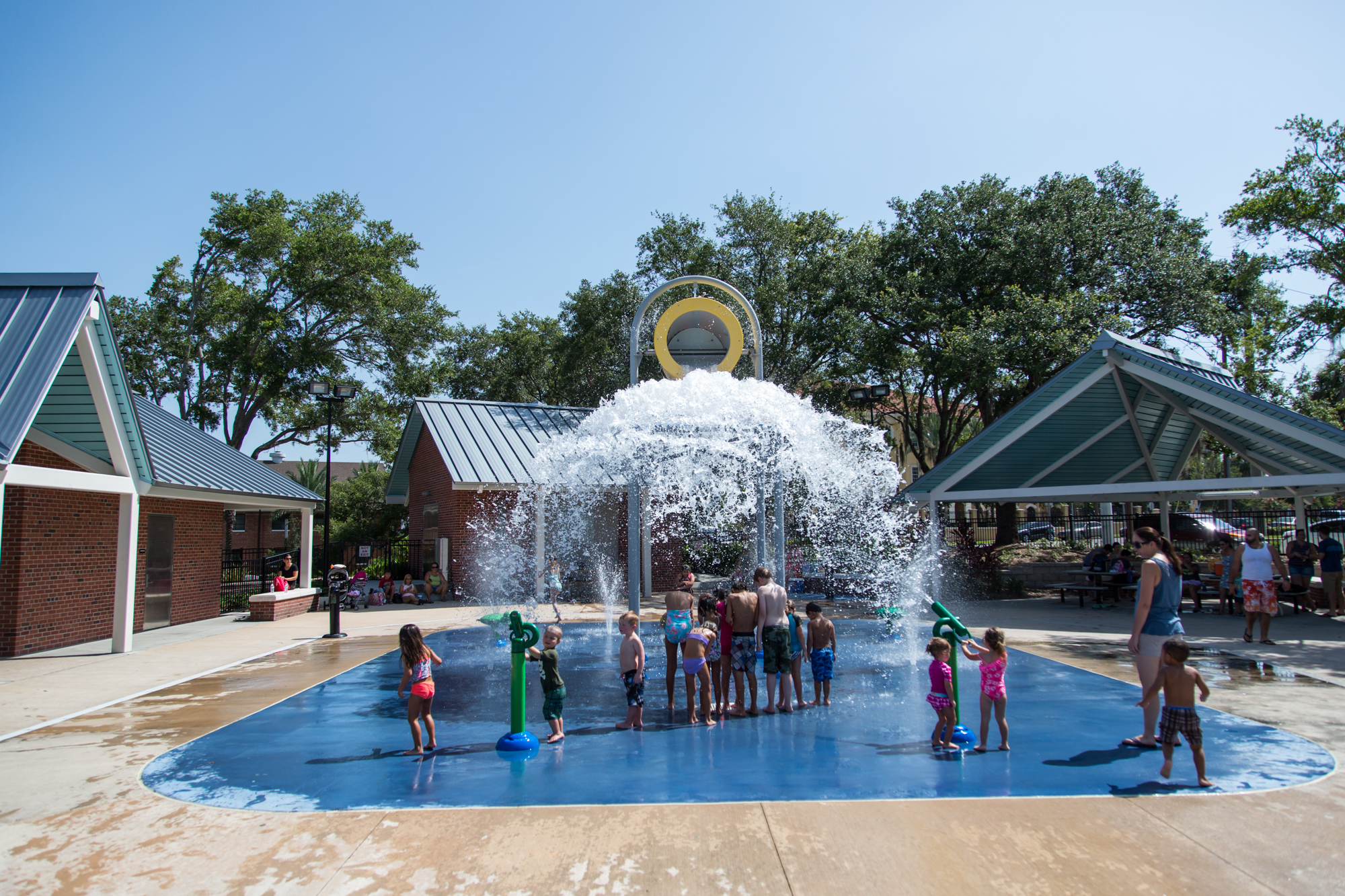
