= List of public art in Tampa, Florida =

This is a list of public art installations in Tampa, Florida, organized by neighborhoods in the city. These are works of public art accessible in an outdoor public space. Most of the works mentioned are sculptures. When this is not the case (i.e. sound installation, for example) it is stated next to the title.

== Al López Park ==
Title	Artist	Year	Location/GPS Coordinates	Material	Dimensions	Owner	Image
Al López	Steven Dickey	1992	Al López Park 27°58′54.02″N 82°30′6.02″W	Bronze	approx. 5 ft. 6 in. x 2 ft. 7 in. x 2 ft.	City of Tampa Public Art Program	
Arcade	Robert Calvo	1990	Al López Park	Painted Cor-Ten steel, wood	Gothic bridge: approx. 152 x 110 x 510 in.; Oriental bridge: approx. 124 x 115 x 509 in.	City of Tampa Public Art Program	
Two on a Swing	Steven Dickey		Hunt Community Center	Bronze		City of Tampa Public Art Program	

== Bayshore Beautiful ==
Title	Artist	Year	Location/GPS Coordinates	Material	Dimensions	Owner	Image
Movement in Space	Ross Lewis	1995	Interbay Glover YMCA	Aluminium	Approx. 26 x 66 x 1 ft.	City of Tampa Public Art Program	

== Bayshore Gardens ==
Title	Artist	Year	Location/GPS Coordinates	Material	Dimensions	Owner	Image
Wave	Mary Ann Unger	1989	Bayshore Blvd. median at Rubideaux 27°55′17.48″N 82°29′16.88″W	Steel, paint	Approx. 10 x 15 x 6 ft.	City of Tampa Public Art Program	

== Bayside West ==
Title	Artist	Year	Location/GPS Coordinates	Material	Dimensions	Owner	Image
José Gaspar	Helmuth Von Zengen	1955	Regency Cove Trailer Park	Concrete	Approx. 10 x 4 1/2 x 5 ft.	Homes of Regency Cove	

== Beasley-Oak Park ==
Title	Artist	Year	Location/GPS Coordinates	Material	Dimensions	Owner	Image
Untitled	Nancy Gutkin O'Neil		5400 E. 14th Ave.	Glass		City of Tampa Public Art Program	

== Carver City-Lincoln Gardens ==
Title	Artist	Year	Location/GPS Coordinates	Material	Dimensions	Owner	Image
The Earth is Our Garden	Nina Borgia Aberle & Stephen Grede	2003	City of Tampa Solid Waste Administration Building	Ceramic tile		City of Tampa Public Art Program	

== Channel District ==
Title	Artist	Year	Location/GPS Coordinates	Material	Dimensions	Owner	Image
Ceremonial Space	Bob Haozous	2009	Riverwalk & Fort Brooke Park	Stainless steel, brick, rocks		City of Tampa Public Art Program	
Ode to the Tampa Laborer	Jim Hirshfield & Sonya Ishii		3 locations: Household Finance Corporation Station, Tampa Tribune Station & Cumberland Avenue	Bronze, stainless steel & terrazzo		City of Tampa Public Art Program	

== Downtown ==
Title	Artist	Year	Location/GPS Coordinates	Material	Dimensions	Owner	Image
America, America	Barbara Neijna	1977	Riverwalk	Steel	Approx. 25 ft. x 12 ft. 6 in. x 80 in.	City of Tampa Public Art Program	
Au Coup de Fusil	Maurice de Nonvilliers	1890	Henry B. Plant Museum		Approx. 3 x 5 x 3 ft.	University of Tampa	
Centennial Clock Keep	William Culbertson	2004	Tampa Union Station 27°57′9.78″N 82°27′3.76″W	Cast concrete, clocks, brick	27 ft.	City of Tampa Public Art Program	
Chair Muse	Bradley Arthur	1982	City Hall Plaza	Cor-Ten steel, stainless steel	121 x 42 x 32 in.	City of Tampa Public Art Program	
Ecstatic City	Chris Doyle	2009	Tampa Convention Center	Disco balls		City of Tampa Public Art Program	
Friendship	Nancy Young	1994	Curtis Hixon Park	Bronze	Appro. 57 x 45 x 32 in.	City of Tampa Public Art Program	
Historic Central Avenue	Anthony Moore		Kid Mason Community Center	Acrylic paint	10’ x 9’	City of Tampa Public Art Program	
John Fitzgerald Kennedy	Bernhard Zuckermann	1966	Henry B. Plant Museum	Carrara marble	Approx. 15 x 21 x 3 ft.	City of Tampa Public Art Program	
Lightning	Jonathan Borofsky	1997	Amalie Arena 27°56′35.06″N 82°27′9.46″W	Painted steel	75’ x 38’ x 38’ ft.	City of Tampa Public Art Program	
Luminous Affirmations	Stephen Knapp	2005	Tampa Municipal Office Building	Laminated glass, Halogen lights		City of Tampa Public Art Program	
Lux Flux	Eva Lee	2011	Straz Center for the Performing Arts, Riverwalk & Tampa Bay History Center	Video animation		City of Tampa Public Art Program	
Memoria in Aeterna	Unknown	1911	Hillsborough County Courthouse	Stone	Approx. H. 50 ft.	Hillsborough County	
Memorial Highway Monument to the Victims of World War I	August Fox	1921	John F. Kennedy Blvd.	Granite & Carrara marble	Approx. 37 ft. x 47 1/2 in. x 45 1/2 in.	Rotary International	
Over the Waves	C. Paul Jennewein	1927 or 1929	Tampa City Center Esplanade	Bronze & patina	Approx. H. 54 in.	Tampa Museum of Art	
Parking At the Courthouse	Mike Mandel	2000	Tampa Police Department parking garage	Ceramic tile	9.5' sloping to 15’ x 145’	City of Tampa Public Art Program	
Riverwall	Bruce Marsh	2009	Channelside Drive and S. Beneficial Drive	Photographs, steel plates & porcelain enamel	88" x 48"	City of Tampa Public Art Program	
Shedding Light	Juliet Davis & Stephanie Tripp	2011	Riverwalk at Curtis Hixon Park	Video		City of Tampa Public Art Program	
Solstice	Charles O. Perry	1985	Barnett Plaza	Stainless steel	H. 28 ft.		
Sticks of Fire	O.V. Shaffer	1984	Henry B. Plant Museum	Stainless steel	Approx. H. 40 x Diam. 48 ft.	City of Tampa Public Art Program	
Tampa in Relief	Peter King		Cotanchobee Park	Ceramic inlay		City of Tampa Public Art Program	
Transportation	George Grey Barnard	1900	University of Tampa	Limestone	Approx. 9 x 9 1/2 x 5 ft.	City of Tampa Public Art Program	
Untitled	George Sugarman	1988	400 N. Ashley Dr.	Aluminium plates & paint	Approx. 36 x 30 x 30 ft.		
Watershed	Molly Schwartz	2011	Riverwalk at Curtis Hixon Park	Video animation		City of Tampa Public Art Program	
Zig Zag	Linda Howard	1987	Straz Center for the Performing Arts	Welded brushed aluminium	Approx. 8 x 10 x 8 1/2 ft.	City of Tampa Public Art Program	

== Forest Hills ==
Title	Artist	Year	Location/GPS Coordinates	Material	Dimensions	Owner	Image
Windows on Forest Hills	Bud Lee	2002	Forest Hills Community Center	Photograph		City of Tampa Public Art Program	

== Historic Hyde Park North ==
Title	Artist	Year	Location/GPS Coordinates	Material	Dimensions	Owner	Image
Christopher Columbus	Alberto Sabas	1953	Bayshore Blvd. at Platt St. Bridge	Bronze	Approx. 86 x 44 x 27 in.	Ybor City Rotary	
Equinimity	Bud Oleson		Bayshore Blvd. & Gandy Blvd.	Metal		City of Tampa Public Art Program	
Family of Man	Geoffrey Naylor	1995	Bayshore Blvd. median just north of Gandy Blvd.	Stainless steel	13’ x 8’ x 4’	City of Tampa Public Art Program	
Fish on Bayshore	Lorraine Genovar	1995	Bayshore Blvd.; near Platt St. Bridge	Fiberglass	10 x 9 ft.	City of Tampa Public Art Program	
Winged Figure: From the Firmament	Michele Oka Doner	1992	Bayshore Blvd. between Platt Street Bridge & Gandy Blvd.	Bronze	15 markers; each approx Diam. 6 in.	City of Tampa Public Art Program	

== Jackson Heights ==
Title	Artist	Year	Location/GPS Coordinates	Material	Dimensions	Owner	Image
Great Balls of Pliers	John Rogers	2003	3806 E. 26th Ave. and 40th St.	Powder coated galvanized steel, aluminium, safety-red pliers, diachronic glass, cables	24' x 14' ft.	City of Tampa Public Art Program	
Saga of St. Benedict	James Tokley		20th St. & Columbus Dr.	Granite		City of Tampa Public Art Program	
Untitled (Tampa Police Dept. District 3 mosaic)	Charles Hume Jr.		Tampa Police Dept. District 3, 3808 N. 22nd St.	Glass tile		City of Tampa Public Art Program	

== Lowry Park Central ==
Title	Artist	Year	Location/GPS Coordinates	Material	Dimensions	Owner	Image
Marine Madonna	Tom Tischler	1986	Lowry Park Zoo	Bronze	Approx. H. 9 ft. x W. 10 ft.	City of Tampa Public Art Program	
Sheena	Joyce Parkerson	1986	Lowry Park Zoo	Bronze	Approx. H. 4 ft. x W. 5 ft. 3 in.	City of Tampa Public Art Program	

== Lowry Park North ==
Title	Artist	Year	Location/GPS Coordinates	Material	Dimensions	Owner	Image
(The Six Palms)			3450 Colwell Ave.	Aluminium & steel	Approx. 22 ft. x 18 ft. 5 in. x 17 ft. 5 in.		

== Macfarlane Park ==
Title	Artist	Year	Location/GPS Coordinates	Material	Dimensions	Owner	Image
Untitled	Raymond Olivero		MacFarlane Park			City of Tampa Public Art Program	

== New Tampa ==
Title	Artist	Year	Location/GPS Coordinates	Material	Dimensions	Owner	Image
Winning	Lewis Watkins (sculptor)	1984	Lettuce Lake Park	Steel	Approx. 7 x 5 x 5 ft.	Hillsborough County, Department of Parks & Recreation	

== Northeast Macfarlane ==
Title	Artist	Year	Location/GPS Coordinates	Material	Dimensions	Owner	Image
Kaleidoscope: Heritage of Color	Edgar Sanchez Cumbas & Guillermo Portieles		Macfarlane Park	Acrylic paint on cement		City of Tampa Public Art Program	

== Old Seminole Heights ==
Title	Artist	Year	Location/GPS Coordinates	Material	Dimensions	Owner	Image
Nestbuilder	Leslie Fry	2010	Seminole Garden Center, 5850 N. Central Avenue	Cast stone		City of Tampa Public Art Program	

== Palm River-Clair Mel ==
Title	Artist	Year	Location/GPS Coordinates	Material	Dimensions	Owner	Image
Portrait Bust of E. L. Bing	Carl Norton	1992	E.L. Bing Elementary School	Bronze & patina	Approx. 16 x 10 x 8 in.	E.L. Bing Elementary School	

== Port Tampa ==
Title	Artist	Year	Location/GPS Coordinates	Material	Dimensions	Owner	Image
Windows on Port Tampa	Bud Lee		Port Tampa Community Center	Photographs		City of Tampa Public Art Program	

== Sulphur Springs ==
Title	Artist	Year	Location/GPS Coordinates	Material	Dimensions	Owner	Image
Sulphur Springs: Reflections of a Century	Bruce Marsh	2000	Sulphur Springs Park	Glass tiles	9’ x 33’	City of Tampa Public Art Program	

== Swann Estates ==
Title	Artist	Year	Location/GPS Coordinates	Material	Dimensions	Owner	Image
Memorial Highway Monument to the Victims of World War I	August Fox	1921	American Legion Cemetery	Granite & Carrara marble	Approx. 37 ft. x 47 1/2 in. x 45 1/2 in.	American Legion	

== Temple Crest ==
Title	Artist	Year	Location/GPS Coordinates	Material	Dimensions	Owner	Image
Rowlett Park Murals	Mike Parker & Community Stepping Stones		Rowlett Park	Acrylic paint		City of Tampa Public Art Program	

== Tampa International Airport ==
Title	Artist	Year	Location	Material	Dimensions	Owner	Image
HOME (Phoebe the Flamingo)	Matthew Mazzotta	2022	Main Terminal	Polyester resin & Fiberglass		Hillsborough County Aviation Authority	

== University of South Florida ==
Title	Artist	Date	Location	Medium/Materials	Dimensions	Owner	Image
da Vinci's Dream	Maria Emilia	1996	University of South Florida	Stainless steel, plywood, aluminium & neon	Approx. 144 x 175 x 10 in.	University of South Florida	
Earth and Sky Garden	Dale Eldred	1993	University of South Florida	Mixed media, stainless steel, glass, granite & bronze		Florida Department of State	
Icon II	Alexander Liberman	1973	University of South Florida	Metal & paint	Approx. 10 x 8 x 8 ft.	University of South Florida	
Just Pink and Turquoise	Lynda Benglis	1988	University of South Florida	Neon & iron	Approx. 53 x 51 x 23 in.	Florida Department of State	
Multiple Forms-A Mockup	Doris Marie Leeper	1975	University of South Florida – Cooper Hall	Acrylic paint & plywood	Approx. 118 in. x 12 ft. x 18 in.	University of South Florida	
Our Shadow	Ned Smyth	1994	University of South Florida – Contemporary Art Museum	White gold, cement & coral	Approx. H. 8 ft. x W. 24 ft.	University of South Florida	
Sanctuary	Elyn Zimmerman	1991	H. Lee Moffitt Cancer Center & Research Institute	Concrete, limestone & plants	Approx. H. 9 ft. x Diam. 40 ft.	State of Florida	
Solar Rotary	Nancy Holt	1985	University of South Florida	Aluminium, concrete, bronze, soil, lights, plants & meteorite	Approx. H. 20 ft. x Diam. 24 ft.	University of South Florida	
Concentric Figures	Harrison Covington	1996	University of South Florida	Steel, paint		University of South Florida	
Totem Pole	Charles Rostron	ca. 1990	James A. Haley Veterans Hospital	Cypress	Approx. 24 x 5 x 2 ft.	Veterans Health Administration	
Unspecific Gravity	Douglas Hollis	1996	University of South Florida – Contemporary Art Museum	Stainless steel, concrete, plants, gravel		University of South Florida	
Untitled (deaccessioned)	Richard Fleischner	1996	H. Lee Moffitt Cancer Center & Research Institute	Cor-Ten steel, granite, trees, linoleum, glass & wood		University of South Florida	

== University Square ==
Title	Artist	Year	Location/GPS Coordinates	Material	Dimensions	Owner	Image
Untitled (Tampa Police District 2 mural)	Chico Garcia	2011	Tampa Police District 2 Headquarters, 9330 N. 30th St.	Spray paint	10 x 20 ft.	City of Tampa Public Art Program	

== Uptown ==
Title	Artist	Year	Location/GPS Coordinates	Material	Dimensions	Owner	Image
Untitled (Florida Avenue Mural)	Carl Cowden	2003	Pyper, Paul & Kenney	Acrylic on stucco		City of Tampa Public Art Program	

== Westshore ==
Title	Artist	Year	Location/GPS Coordinates	Material	Dimensions	Owner	Image
Editorial without Words	Harrison Covington	1980	Shriners headquarters	Polyester & patina	Approx. 9 x 4 x 4 ft.	Shriners	

== Woodland Terrace ==
Title	Artist	Year	Location/GPS Coordinates	Material	Dimensions	Owner	Image
Resting Place	Lindsay McCoy	2002	Police & Fire Rescue Communications Center	Tile		City of Tampa Public Art Program	

== Ybor City ==
Title	Artist	Year	Location/GPS Coordinates	Material	Dimensions	Owner	Image
Adela Gonzmart	Steven Dickey	2003	Ybor Centennial Park	Bronze		City of Tampa Public Art Program	
Cesar Gonzmart	Steven Dickey	1993	Ybor Centennial Park	Bronze	Approx. 28 x 36 x 16 in.	City of Tampa Public Art Program	
Don Gavino Gutierrez	Unknown	ca. 1923	Centro Asturiano de Tampa 27°57′42.95″N 82°27′4.1″W	Concrete	Approx. 27 x 26 x 17 in.	Centro Asturiano de Tampa	
Honor to Mothers of the World	T. Ramos Blanco	1948	Plaza Espanol, Between 7th & 8th Ave. & 15th & 16th St.	Concrete	Approx. 8 x 2 x 2 ft.	City of Tampa Public Art Program	
I-4 Medallions	William Culbertson		Overpass of Interstate 4 at 22nd Street			City of Tampa Public Art Program	
Immigrant Statue	Steven Dickey	1991	Ybor Centennial Park	Bronze	Approx. 6 ft. x 3 ft. 10 in. x 3 ft.	City of Tampa Public Art Program	
José Martí	Unknown	1949	Circulo Cubano de Tampa 27°57′44.38″N 82°26′39.64″W	Painted metal	Approx. 32 x 21 x 15 in.	Circulo Cubano de Tampa	
José Martí	Alberto Sabas	1960	José Martí Park 27°57′38.68″N 82°26′43.04″W	Concrete	Approx. 90 x 26 x 45 in.	City of Tampa	
Nick Nuccio	Steven Dickey	1998	Ybor Centennial Park	Bronze		City of Tampa Public Art Program	
Ode to the Tampa Laborer	Jim Hirshfield & Sonya Ishii		3 locations: Cadrecha Plaza, Streetcar Society station & Centennial Park station	Bronze, stainless steel & terrazzo		City of Tampa Public Art Program	
Roland Manteiga	Steven Dickey	2003	Ybor Centennial Park	Bronze		City of Tampa Public Art Program	
Tony Pizzo	Steven Dickey	1994	Ybor Centennial Park	Bronze	Approx. 68 x 40 x 32 in.	City of Tampa Public Art Program	
Untitled	Dean James	ca. 1986	Courtyard at 1320 E. 9th Ave		Approx. 10 x 10 x 10 ft.		
Vicente Martinez Ybor	Steven Dickey	2001	Ybor Centennial Park	Bronze		City of Tampa Public Art Program	
Ybor City Streetscapes	Connie Lloveras	2000	7th Ave	Granite & pavement	123 pieces of various dimensions	City of Tampa Public Art Program	
