= Ferdie Pacheco =

Physician for Muhammad Ali and boxing commentator (1927–2017)

- Born: December 8, 1927; Tampa, Florida, U.S.
- Died: November 16, 2017 (aged 89); Miami, Florida, U.S.
- Education: University of Florida; Miller School of Medicine, University of Miami
- Occupations: Artist, author, physician, sports commentator
- Spouse(s): Luisita, Elva Sweeney Pacheco (divorced)
- Children: 4

Fernando Pacheco Jimenez (December 8, 1927 – November 16, 2017) known publicly as Ferdie Pacheco, was the personal physician and cornerman for world heavyweight boxing champion Muhammad Ali as well as numerous other boxing champions. Pacheco was also a long-time boxing television commentator, and the first Spanish interpreter for English speaking boxing broadcasts in the United States.

Known in popular culture as The Fight Doctor, Pacheco left Ali's team in the fall of 1977 after Ali didn't perform as expected in a battery of physical reflex tests, leading Ali to reject Pacheco's medical advice to retire.

For the next two decades, Pacheco was a noted boxing analyst for several television networks, including NBC and Showtime. He also became an author and self-taught painter, with most of his works focused on his career in boxing and his youth in the Ybor City neighborhood of Tampa, Florida.

== Early life and education ==
Pacheco was born in the Cuban-American immigrant community of Ybor City in Tampa, Florida, to Jose (J.D.) Pacheco, a pharmacist, and Consuelo Jimenez, both of Spaniard-Cuban descent. Pacheco was raised bilingual, which he would later say was one of the most critical decisions his parents ever made to ensure his success. Pacheco worked in his father's drugstore, which sparked his interest in medicine. As a teenager, Pacheco was also a waiter at the Columbia Restaurant.

Though not a boxer himself, Pacheco took an early interest in boxing. Ybor City at the time was a community known as a boxing hotbed, with amateur matches regularly held at the Circulo Cubano de Tampa and other clubs and venues around the neighborhood, and Pacheco attended many bouts. Pacheco also developed an early interest in art, which was inspired by a trip to the Ringling Museum of Art in Sarasota with his maternal grandfather, Gustavo Jimenez.

Pacheco graduated from Tampa Jefferson High School, earned a bachelor's degree in pharmacy from the University of Florida and completed his medical degree in 1958 from the Miller School of Medicine at the University of Miami.

== Career ==
As a young physician, Pacheco set up a medical practice in the Overtown community of Miami. In the late 1950s, he regularly attended boxing cards arranged by local promoter Chris Dundee. One night after a fight card, Pacheco was introduced to Angelo Dundee, the promoter's brother, a boxing trainer who ran the 5th Street Gym. Angelo Dundee offered the doctor free tickets to matches if he would "help stitch up my fighters", beginning an iconic partnership that would last many years.

=== Muhammad Ali ===
Pacheco met Muhammad Ali in 1960, when he came to the 5th Street Gym in Miami, to train with Angelo Dundee. Pacheco became Ali's cornerman and fight physician from 1962 to 1977. Pacheco described Ali as anatomically the most physically perfect human being he had ever seen. When Ali joined the Nation of Islam and changed his name from Cassius Clay in 1964, members of the Nation reportedly wanted him to replace Pacheco, Dundee, and the rest of his support staff. Ali refused, preferring to continue working with the team of people who had helped him become heavyweight champion.

By the mid-1970s, Pacheco observed that Ali's reflexes had slowed, and expressed medical concern that the now veteran boxer had sustained some brain and kidney damage due to years of punishment in the ring.

Following an Ali victory against the hard-hitting Earnie Shavers in September 1977, Pacheco performed a post-fight battery of reflex tests on Ali. After Ali didn't perform at a level that would be requisite for being able to protect himself in the ring, an alarmed Pacheco recommended that Ali retire immediately from boxing. When Ali refused, Pacheco decided that from both a medical and ethical perspective, he could no longer continue as Ali's primary physician and left the fighter's camp. Pacheco later explained, "The New York State Athletic Commission gave me a report that showed Ali's kidneys were falling apart. I wrote to Angelo Dundee, Ali's trainer, his wife and Ali himself. I got nothing back in response. That's when I decided enough is enough." Ali fought four more matches (losing three) after Pacheco left his team before finally retiring in late 1981.

Despite their disagreement, Pacheco and Ali remained friends. The two were reunited in person for a final time in 2002, when Ali, who was by then suffering the acute effects of Parkinson's syndrome, told his former physician, "You was right."

== Later life ==
Pacheco moved on to become a television boxing analyst, working for NBC and Univision. As a first generation Cuban-American, Pacheco spoke Spanish fluently, and was the first regular interpreter for English speaking boxing broadcasts in the United States. Pacheco's ability to conduct interviews in real time, as well as translate what boxers and cornermen were discussing between rounds for English speaking networks when bouts featured Spanish speaking fighters and cornermen endeared him to both Latino fighters and their fans. Julio Cesar Chavez in particular believed that Pacheco was one of only a few in the American media that interviewed Latino fighters and their handlers fairly due to his ability to ask fighters such as Chavez questions in Spanish without losing the meaning of anything said in translation. Pacheco frequently provided color commentary in Spanish for the broadcast of major bouts, as well as other sports-related packages televised on Univision.

“The key is to be 100 percent accurate. You don’t summarize things. You don’t change things. You don’t editorialize. You are there to be seamless.”

— Ferdie Pacheco, on translating broadcasts to and from English and Spanish

Pacheco would become Showtime's featured boxing analyst in the early 1980s and continued his association with the network until his retirement from TV in the late 1990s, covering many notable fights along the way.

Pacheco was the author of several books, plays, screenplays, and short stories. Many of them are set in the Ybor City neighborhood where he grew up. Pacheco's works included a memoir (Ybor City Chronicles), an autobiography (Blood in My Coffee) and a cookbook (The Columbia Restaurant Spanish Cookbook, co-authored with longtime friend Adela Gonzmart).

Pacheco was also an award-winning self-taught artist, primarily inspired by Norman Rockwell with influences of Diego Rivera's use of bold colors. As with his writing, the subjects of many of his paintings are boxing and his youth in Ybor City.

Pacheco was portrayed by Paul Rodriguez in the cinema film Ali (2001). A biographical film, Ferdie Pacheco: The World of the Fight Doctor, was released in 2004.

== Personal life ==
Pacheco resided in Miami with his wife, Luisita, with whom he had daughter Tina Louise. Pacheco had two daughters and one son with former wife Elva Anne Sweeney: Dawn Marie, Evelyn, and Ferdie James.

== Death ==
Pacheco died in his sleep on November 16, 2017, at his home in Miami, at the age of 89.
