= Lowry Park (disambiguation) =

Lowry Park may refer to:

- Lowry Park Central, Tampa, Florida
- Lowry Park North, Tampa, Florida
- ZooTampa at Lowry Park, a zoo in Lowry Park Central
