= Roundabout (disambiguation) =

A roundabout is a type of road junction at which traffic enters a stream around a central island after first giving way to the circulating traffic.

Roundabout may also refer to:

== Music ==
- Roundabout (album), a 2006 album by Phil Keaggy
- "Roundabout" (Yes song), a song by Yes
- "Roundabout" (Connie Francis song), a song by Connie Francis
- Roundabout, an early name for the rock band Deep Purple
- "Roundabout", a song by the Beths from Straight Line Was a Lie

== Film and television ==
- Roundabout (1950 film), English title of the French film La Ronde
- Roundabout (1957 film), an Australian television film
- Roundabout (1989 film), English title of the French film Un tour de manège
- Roundabout (TV program), a 1967–1971 Australian morning television program that aired on ATV-0 (now ATV-10)

== Rides ==
- Carousel, a fairground ride also known as a roundabout
- Roundabout (play), a children's ride similar to a carousel
- Round About (roller coaster), a roller coaster at Freestyle Music Park in Myrtle Beach, South Carolina

== Other ==
- Round About (sculpture), a sculpture by Linda Howard at the Lynden Sculpture Garden
- Roundabout, Newfoundland and Labrador, a defunct settlement in Canada
- Roundabout interchange, an interchange between a freeway and a minor road
- Roundabout Theatre Company, a non-profit theater company based in New York City
- Roundabout family, a family of transmembrane receptors
- Roundabout (video game), a 2014 independent computer game
- Roundabout, a type of bet offered by UK bookmakers
- Roundabout, an American term for a jacket also known as a wamus

== See also ==
- Roundaboutness, a method of goods production
