= Richard Gonzmart =

American restauranteur (born 1953)

- Born: Ricardo Orlando Gonzalez-Gonzmart; 21 March 1953 (age 73); Tampa, Florida, US
- Occupations: restaurateur, community leader
- Years active: 1973–present
- Known for: Columbia Restaurant
- Spouse: Melanie Heiny
- Children: Lauren and Andrea
- Parents: Cesar Gonzmart (father); Adela Hernandez (mother)

Richard Gonzmart (born March 21, 1953) is chairman of the Columbia Restaurant, the 1905 Family Of Restaurants and a Community leader.

== Early years ==
Gonzmart is the second child of César Gonzmart and Adela Hernandez Gonzmart, born in Tampa, Florida after his parents retired as touring musicians and assisted with the family's business, the Columbia Restaurant. His older brother, Casey, also worked in the family restaurant business.

Gonzmart recalls his grandfather, Casimiro Hernandez Jr., teaching him to identify fresh fish when he was 3½-years-old. He and worked summers in the Columbia restaurant kitchen beginning at age 12.

He graduated from Jesuit High School in Tampa with the class of 1971. His next stop was at the University of Denver, Daniels College of Business studying at the Fritz Knoebel School of Hospitality Management. He also studied in Madrid, Spain at the Escuela de Turismo y Hosteleria.

=== Name origin ===
His father, César Gonzalez Martinez, changed the family's surname to Gonzmart, drawn both from his father's surname of Gonzalez and his mother's name, Martinez.

=== Family ===
Gonzmart married Melanie Heiny, his high school sweetheart, in 1973. The couple have two daughters, Lauren and Andrea; the latter is a fifth-generation owner/operator of the family's restaurant business. There are five grandchildren.

As a runner, Gonzmart has completed 24 marathons and more than 100 triathlons. In 1990, he was state champion of the ESM Triathlon series and finished third in the National Sprint Triathlon championships in his age division. On two occasions, he ran with the bulls in Pamplona, Spain.

Gonzmart completed a 7-week Citizens Training Academy hosted by the Tampa Police Department. He became an honorary sheriff's deputy of Hillsborough County and honorary police officer in Tampa.

=== Publications ===
Gonzmart authored/co-authored two books, including "The Columbia Restaurant: Celebrating a Century of History, Culture and Cuisine," a collection of both historical research and beloved restaurant recipes.

=== Dogs ===
He has a passion for German Shepherds; he breeds and shows world-class animals internationally. When Gonzmart was young, his parents bought a dog for protection after being twice victimized by robbers in their home. Gonzmart brings two of his dogs with him to work most days, which gives him a sense of security. His daughter Andrea has her own shepherd.

== Career ==
Gonzmart has focused on promoting, managing and expanding his family's Spanish and Cuban-themed group of Columbia Restaurants and Columbia Cafes in addition to expanding the brands under the 1905 Family Of Restaurants. In 1991, just before his father's death, the group of Columbia restaurants earned $42 million.

=== Columbia ===
The Columbia Restaurant in Ybor City, Tampa, Florida is the oldest continuously operated restaurant in Florida as well as the oldest Spanish restaurant in the United States. It was founded by Casimiro Hernandez Sr., Richard Gonzmart's great-grandfather. In addition to the original location in Ybor City, there are Columbia restaurants in Sarasota (opened in 1959); in St. Augustine (opened in 1983); on Sand Key (1989); and in Celebration, Florida (1997). There are also smaller Columbia Café restaurants located at the Tampa Bay History Center on the Riverwalk (opened in 2009) and at Tampa International Airport (opened in May 2012).

=== Other eateries ===
Gonzmart oversaw the 1988 launch of tropical-themed Cha-Cha Coconuts, a casual, tropical-themed bar and restaurant on Sarasota's St. Armands Circle on Lido Key.

The restaurant Ulele opened in August 2014 in Tampa Heights overlooking the Hillsborough River. It was named for the daughter of a native Tocobaga chief as well as the adjacent Ulele Spring which flows to the river. The menu features native-inspired dishes. The restaurant features an on-site brewery, Ulele Spring Brewery, a nod to Columbia's 1903 origins as Saloon Columbia.

Goody Goody™ was a popular Tampa burger restaurant that opened in 1925 but closed in 2005. Gonzmart reopened it in August 2016 in Hyde Park Village, featuring the original Burger P.O.X. and butterscotch pie.

Café Con Leche Ybor City was a new concept that premiered in March 2017 at Tampa International Airport in addition to new locations of Ulele and Goody Goody in Airside C.

==== Casa Santo Stefano ====
The Ferlita Macaroni Co. was constructed in 1925 in Ybor City. The building was used to manufacture macaroni and served as a residence for the Ferlita family during the Great Depression. It was saved from demolition in the early 2000s and restored between 2009 and 2012.

Gonzmart's Casa Santo Stefano restaurant opened November 2020 in the former Ferlita macaroni factory. The companion Santo’s Drinkeria is situated on the building's rooftop. The restaurant pays homage to Sicilian immigrants who arrived in Ybor City at the turn of the 19th century for a new life.

== Philanthrophy ==
Gonzmart's family has always been generous to their communities. His parents provided financial and mentoring support to the University of South Florida in Tampa since the university's opening in 1960. The Latino Scholarship program was initiated by his mother in 1991 to help deserving minority students at USF. Throughout his life, he gave both of his time and treasure.

=== Speaking ===
Gonzmart speaks about hospitality at numerous events every year that range from commencement speeches to high school classes to college courses.

=== Fundraising ===
April: The 28th annual Cesar Gonzmart Memorial Gourmet Golf Tournament was held April 26, 2024. Money from players and sponsors benefit several USF's Latino Scholarship Program.

June: In 2014 Gonzmart began the annual Richard’s Father’s Day Family Walk/Jog to benefit Moffitt Cancer Center. Over $1 million raised.

September: The Community Harvest program is an annual event. Since its inception in 1998, over $4.4 million has gone to non-profit organizations in Florida. All Columbia, Ulele, Casa Santo Stefano and Cha Cha Coconuts restaurants donate 5 percent of guest checks to local charities chosen by the guests.

November: Richard’s Run For Life is a 5K run that also benefits the Moffitt Cancer Center. The event has generated more than $3 million since 2002.

== Hall of Fames ==
- Distinguished Restaurants of North America (DiRoNA) Hall of Fame, 2018
- Academy of the Holy Names Athletics Hall of Fame, 2010
- Florida Tourism Hall of Fame by the Florida Commission on Tourism, 2006
- Tampa Bay Business Hall of Fame, 2003
- Florida State University Dedman School of Hospitality Hall of Fame, 2001
- Jesuit Athletic Hall of Fame, 2000

== Boards of Directors ==
- Gonzmart Family Foundation
- St. Leo University, Board of Trustees
- Tampa Bay Lightning, Community Heroes Advisory Committee
- H. Lee Moffitt Cancer Center & Research Institute Foundation
- Visit Tampa Bay, Advisory Board
- Starting Right, Now
- University of Tampa, Board of Fellows
- University of Tampa, Inaugural Florida Entrepreneur & Family Business Advisory Board
- Florida Highway Patrol, Advisory Council Executive Board of Directors
- Florida Restaurant and Lodging Association
- University of South Florida, Foundation & Emeritus Society
- University of South Florida, Athletic Task Force
- University of South Florida, Latin Community Advisory Committee
- TGH Foundation, Campaign Committee
- AMI Kids
- Visit Tampa Bay, Chairman
- Tampa Chamber of Commerce, Executive Committee & Board of Governors
- Tampa General Hospital, Governing Board and Trustee
- University of South Florida, Hall of Fame Selection Committee
- Hillsborough County Schools, Culinary Operations Academy, Advisory Committee
- Hillsborough County Commission, Tourist Development Council, 30 years
- Cristo Rey Tampa High School
- Humane Society of Pinellas Advisory Board
- Florida Council on Arts and Culture
- United Way of Tampa Bay
- J. Clifford McDonald Center
- The National Conference of Christians and Jews
- Straz Center for the Performing Arts, Two terms
- Jesuit High School Foundation and the Board of Trustees
- Academy of the Holy Names, Trustee
- Ybor City Chamber of Commerce, President
- St. Johns Florida Restaurant Board, Founding Chairman

== Honors ==
- Appointed to the Selective Service Board by President Ronald Reagan in 1982.
- Iron Bull supporters, USF Athletics,
- Awarded an honorary doctorate in business administration from USF, 2022.
- Pro Ecclesia et Pontifice from Pope Francis
- Semi-finalist for Outstanding Restaurateur three-time.
- Community Hero, Tampa Bay Lightning.
- Community Hero, Boys and Girls Clubs.
- Community Hero, Big Brothers and Big Sisters.

== Books ==
- The Columbia Restaurant: Celebrating a Century of History, Culture, and Cuisine, 2009
- Best-Loved Recipes from the Columbia Restaurant, 2014
