= Evelio Grillo =

Evelio Grillo (June 4, 1919 - December 28, 2008) was an American writer and community organizer. He is a well-known advocate for civil rights. He is best known for his book Black Cuban, Black American: A Memoir.

== Early life and education ==
Grillo was born in Ybor, Florida to Cuban parents.

As a child, Grillo went to segregated schools, noting "Black Cubans were closer to black Americans and white Cubans were closer to white Americans [so we] became culturally African American." Later, Grillo went on to the prestigious Dunbar High School before attending Xavier University of Louisiana, where he received a BA. Post-war, he took classes at Columbia University in New York City, specializing in Latin American history.

== Writing ==
Grillo is the author of the seminal text, Black Cuban, Black American: A Memoir. This memoir detailed not only Grillo's life but the way segregation affected Black Americans during the World War II. It discussed the specific way Afro-Latinos had to live as both Latinos and African-Americans.

== Personal life ==
Grillo died on December 28, 2008, at the age of 89.
