= Tony Pizzo =

American historian

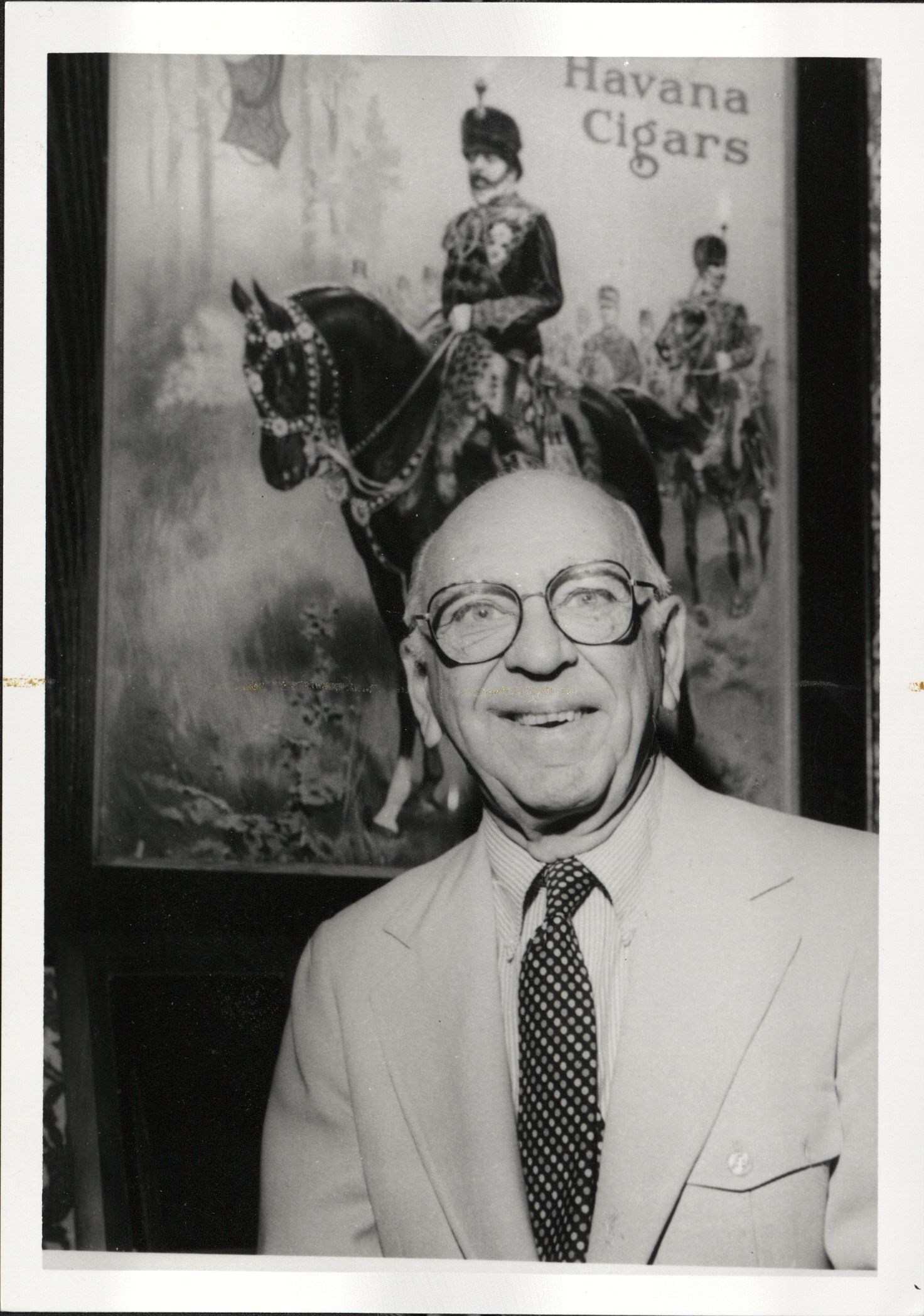
- Born: Anthony P. Pizzo; September 22, 1912; Tampa, Florida
- Died: January 2, 1994 (aged 81); Memorial Hospital of Tampa
- Occupation: Businessman
- Known for: Local historian
- Spouse: Josephine Pizzo
- Children: Paul Pizzo, Tony Pizzo

Anthony P. Pizzo (1912–1994) was a businessman and historian who advocated for the preservation of Italian American and Cuban American heritage and history of Tampa, Florida, and in particular that of his home neighborhood of Ybor City. From 1982 until his death in 1994, Pizzo was the official historian of Hillsborough County, and is author of several histories, most of which celebrate the unusual multicultural makeup of early Tampa. Pizzo also served as chairman of the Hillsborough County Historical Commission from 1968 to 1980, where he oversaw and was responsible for over eighty historical markers in Tampa and Ybor City. He made a television series.

== Early life and education ==
Tony Pizzo was born in Ybor City to Italian parents Paul and Rosalia Pizzo, who were green grocers, in 1912. His parents instilled in him a philanthropic nature and a quest to keep the Italian heritage alive. Paul Pizzo was the organizer of La Nuova Sicilia Lodge, the very first chapter in Florida for the Sons of Italy organization and was honored in the book El Volto d'Italia (The Faces of Italy). Paul and Rosalia Pizzo created an environment filled with social and cultural stimulation, music and art, and placed a large emphasis on kindness and making contributions to your community.

Pizzo described his childhood in fondly poetic terms:

I like to think of the days of my youth in Ybor city ... recall the sights, sounds and smells that enriched my childhood. Life was pleasant and carefree, often exciting. I can still hear the chatter in Spanish and Italian as the workers paraded to the long days of rolling cigars in the factories; the rumbling of wagons and the clump of horses' hooves on the brick streets delivering bottles of milk and loaves of Cuban bread before sunrise... The mellifluous Latin prattle along the sidewalks in the evenings was an enchantment. I can still hear the music from the ballrooms wafting on the night air during festive occasions. Remembering the haunting wail of the train whistle rumbling along Sixth Avenue in the middle of the night awakens a sad sense of nostalgia. The old haunts and departed friends capture my memories. It was a way of life that will not return. It filled the summers of my childhood.

Pizzo attended Hillsborough High School before moving on to the University of Florida for two years. After graduation, he attended Stetson University for law school, but quit to go into business for himself. While at Stetson University, Pizzo met cousin of President Franklin D. Roosevelt Grafton Payne, and together, the two of them toured Europe in 1938. Upon returning home, Pizzo enlisted with the military and served in World War II.

During the 1940s, Pizzo worked in the insurance business, but later left to start his own liquor company, International Brands, before 1950. He left this business a short time later, and began working for House of Midulla, a wholesale liquor company, and served as vice president in charge of sales from 1950 to 1984. From 1965 to 1971, Pizzo was president of Rey Del Mundo Cigar Co., a mail-order business that was among the Midulla affiliates. Pizzo additionally served as vice president and general manager for another affiliate company of Midulla, Fruit Wines of Florida Inc., the first winery to be built in Tampa. Pizzo frequently traveled in Spain and Italy, and while in Sicily he gathered material in 1970 on Italians who came to Ybor City before the turn of the century.

Pizzo also was very active in Tampa history and heritage, teaching about Tampa's Hispanic roots at the University of South Florida, and served as a member of the University of South Florida's presidents Council. During his tenure as a professor in the American Studies department, Pizzo's ten part television series, "Tony Pizzo's Tampa,"(1979) produced by the University of South Florida, won two National University Television Association awards.

== Memberships ==
Pizzo was involved in a great number of organizations throughout his time. Some of his impact can be seen in:

- Historic Tampa/Hillsborough County Preservation Board
- Tampa General Hospital Foundation
- Barrio Latino Commission
- City of Tampa Planning and Zoning Board (1951–1961)
- Federal Housing Authority Advisory Board (1952–1955)
- University of Tampa Foundation (1965–1970)
- Tampa Philharmonic Association (Charter board member)
- Ybor City Redevelopment Committee
- Jose Marti Park Development Committee
- Downtown Tampa Development Council
- U.S. Air Force Academy Selection Advisory Panel (1970–1982)
- Rotary Club of Tampa
- Tampa World Trade Council
- Greater Tampa Chamber of Commerce
- Ybor City Chamber of Commerce
- University Club of Tampa
- Ye Mystic Krewe of Gasparilla
- Tampa Historical Society (Founder)

== Awards ==
Pizzo's work preserving and discovering Tampa's heritage garnered him quite a few awards throughout his lifetime, and even has his own name attached to an award today (see below). Pizzo received the Medal of the National Order of Merit Carlos Manuel de Cespedes from the Cuban government in 1952, the highest award that can be given to a foreigner, presented to him by President Fulgencio Batista for the preservation of Cuban history in Tampa. The Italian government made Pizzo a Knight Officer of the Order of Merit of the Italian Republic in 1974 for similar work with Italian heritage and history in Tampa. In 1956 Pizzo was recognized as an Outstanding citizen with the Tampa Civitan Award, the highest honor bestowed by the city. In 1971 Pizzo founded the Tampa Historical Society, which then awarded him with the D.B. McKay State Award in 1980. The Hillsborough County Bar Association gave Pizzo the Liberty Bell Award on Law Day, 1990. And finally, Pizzo had been recognized many times in banquets during his life, and continued to receive praise in numerous posthumous celebrations.

== Legacy ==
The materials left from Tony Pizzo's historical research create one of the larger personal collections in the Special Collections department of the University of South Florida Tampa Library.

Pizzo Elementary School was named in his honor, and opened in 1998, four years after Pizzo's death. In 2026 it was slated for closure after WUSF raised the rent 10x.

The Tony Pizzo Award is given annually to "someone who has been actively involved in the City or County's Historical Education, Preservation, Research, or Community Service involving the history and heritage of Tampa" and is named in Pizzo's honor.

Pizzo is depicted by one of the bronze statues that adorn Ybor City's streets—monuments to extraordinary citizens of this neighborhood. Pizzo's statue was originally situated at Ninth Avenue and 17th Street, where he is shown mid-lecture, but is now located at Centennial Park at 8th Avenue and 18th Street. The statue was unveiled in September 1995, just one year after Pizzo's death.

Pizzo is featured in a 12,000 square foot mural in Ybor City painted by artist Mike Parker that was dedicated in May 2013. Named "American Journey", it features prominent Ybor citizens through the years, including Ybor City's namesake Vicente Martinez-Ybor, who brought the cigar industry to Tampa from Key West.

== Selected bibliography ==
Pizzo worked tirelessly to preserve, document and share Tampa's historic culture and heritage. He is the author of numerous articles and books on Tampa History including:

- Tampa town, 1824 – 1886; the cracker village with a Latin accent. (1968. OCLC Number: 1527081). Print.
- Tampa Town. (1977. OCLC Number: 47246317). Print.
- Tony Pizzo's Tampa. (1979. OCLC Number: 30752063). 10 Part VHS.
- Tampa, the treasure city. With Gary Ross Mormino. (1983. ISBN 0932986382). Print.
