= Sky Fence =

Public artwork in Wisconsin, United States

Coordinates: 43°10′28.4″N 87°56′12.0″W

- Artist: Linda Howard
- Year: 1976
- Type: brushed aluminum
- Dimensions: 650 cm × 530 cm × 280 cm (254 in × 209 in × 109 in)
- Location: Lynden Sculpture Garden; Milwaukee, Wisconsin

Sky Fence is a public art work by artist Linda Howard located at the Lynden Sculpture Garden near Milwaukee, Wisconsin. The brushed aluminum sculpture has upright louvered elements; it is installed on the lawn. Howard erected the sculpture at Lynden in the fall of 1977. Of Sky Fence, Howard said, "The eye is forced up to the sky. It reaffirms the ground and transcends in the direction of the sky."

== See also ==
- Round About
