= Round About (sculpture) =

Public art work by artist Linda Howard

Coordinates: 43°10′29.6″N 87°56′11.4″W

- Artist: Linda Howard
- Year: 1976
- Type: aluminum
- Dimensions: 240 cm × 240 cm × 240 cm (96 in × 96 in × 96 in)
- Location: Lynden Sculpture Garden; Milwaukee, WI

Round About is a public art work by artist Linda Howard located in Milwaukee, Wisconsin at the Lynden Sculpture Garden. The abstract sculpture consists of aluminum bars stacked horizontally; it is installed on the lawn.

== See also ==
- Sky Fence
