= Steven Dickey =

American sculptor

Steven Dickey is a sculptor in Tampa, Florida. In 2012 he was commissioned by the Friends of the Riverwalk to make six bronze busts of prominent historical figures in Tampa's history to be displayed on the Tampa Riverwalk. The busts will be of James McKay Sr., Henry B. Plant, Vicente Martinez Ybor, Clara Frye, and Eleanor McWilliams Chamberlain. Each bust costs $15,000. Dickey also completed a sculpture of Al López in Tampa's Al López Park in 1992. Dickey also made the Fountain of the Dolphins sculpture at the South Beach-Franklin Delano Roosevelt Boardwalk in Staten Island. It was donated by the Staten Island Borough President’s Office in 1998 and contains six bronze dolphin figures fastened to footings by posts and surrounded by wave-shaped rails. These posts contain fiber-optic cables and water jets that, when illuminated, emit green, blue and white lights.
