= Linda Howard (artist) =

American sculptor (born 1934)

Linda Howard (born 1934) is an American sculptor, who is best known for her large-scale, outdoor artworks. The artist currently lives and works in Bradenton, Florida.

== Early life and education ==
Linda Howard was born in Evanston, Illinois in 1934. In 1957 she attained a Bachelor of Arts degree from the University of Denver. In 1971 Howard attained a Master of Arts degree from Hunter College in New York.

== Work ==
Howard creates large-scale, outdoor sculptures, frequently out of aluminum. Howard has said of her work: I am deeply concerned with the paradox that exists between man's experience of his physical reality and his knowledge of conceptual reality."

In 1978, Howard was commissioned by the Public Art Fund to create a sculpture for the 1980 Winter Olympics in Lake Placid, New York. For this commission, she created Maya (1979), a 1000-pound sculpture made of brushed aluminum, which was temporarily shown in City Hall Park prior to being moved for the Olympics. With the installation of Maya, Howard became the first-ever woman artist to exhibit an artwork in City Hall Park.

== Public collections ==
Howard's sculptures can be seen in many public institutions and spaces, including:

- Round About (sculpture) (1976) and Sky Fence(1976), Lynden Sculpture Garden
- Up/over, Sheldon Museum of Art
- Archway (1991), Frost Art Museum
- Gateway
- Sunyatta (sculpture) (1979), Besthoff Sculpture Garden
- Star Center (1993), Sculpture Fields
