= Columbia Restaurant =

Restaurant in Tampa, Florida, United States

Coordinates: 27°57′36″N 82°26′6″W

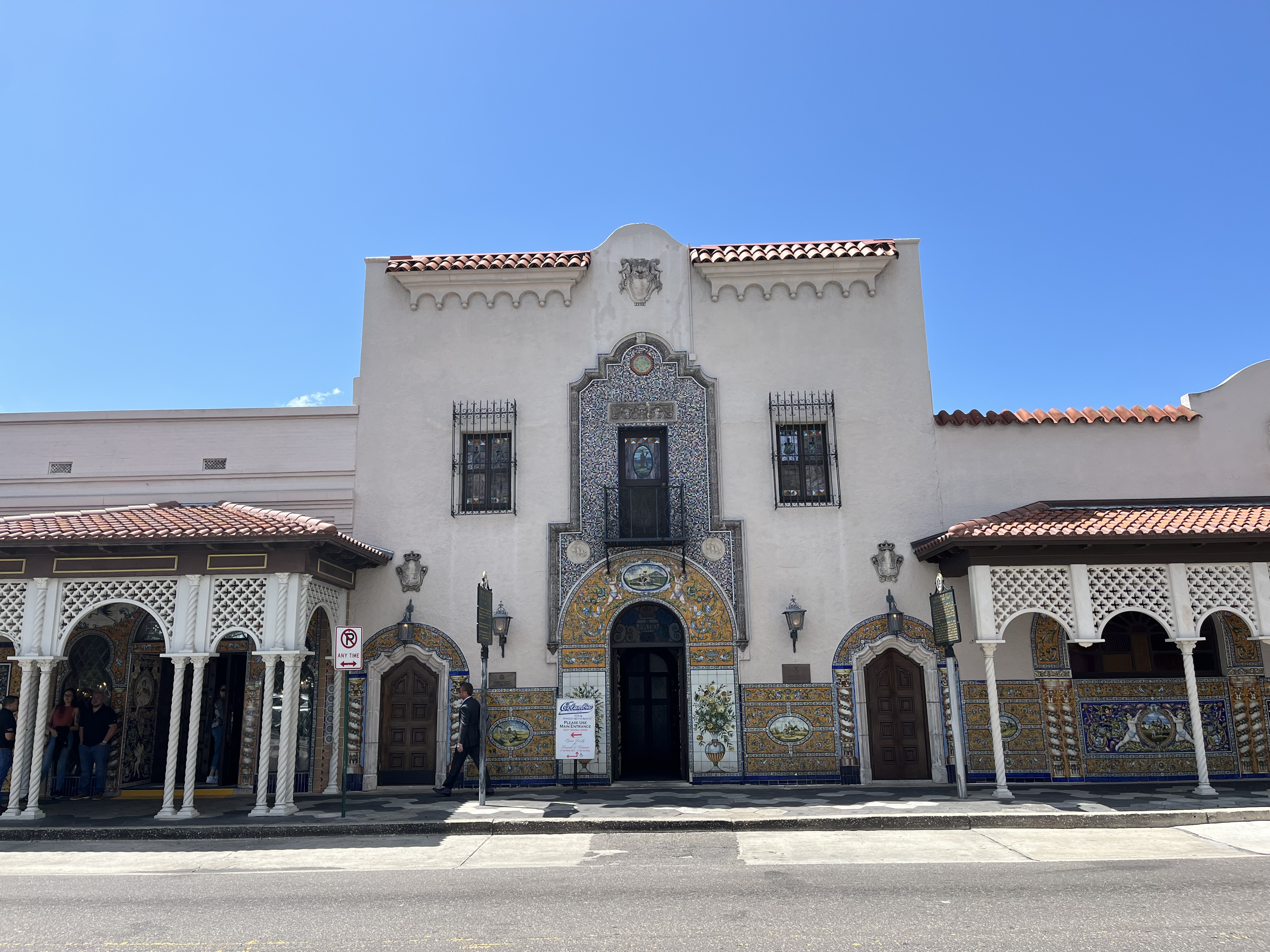
- Type: Private
- Industry: Foodservice
- Predecessor: Saloon Columbia (1903–1905)
- Founded: 1905
- Founder: Casimiro Hernandez, Sr.
- Headquarters: Ybor City, Tampa, Florida, United States
- Number of locations: 7
- Area served: Florida
- Key people: Richard Gonzmart, President/CEO
- Revenue: $42M (1991–last published)
- Number of employees: 1,200
- Parent: 1905 Family Of Restaurants
- Website: www.columbiarestaurant.com

Columbia Restaurant is a restaurant in Ybor City, Tampa, Florida. It is the oldest continuously operated restaurant in Florida, as well as the oldest Spanish restaurant in the United States. The 15 dining rooms cover 52,000 sq ft, seating 1,700 customers. It is the largest Spanish restaurant in the world and occupies an entire city block. Founded in 1903 as Saloon Columbia, it was renamed in 1905 to Columbia Restaurant. The landmark has been owned by the Hernandez-Gonzmart family for five generations and serves Spanish and Cuban cuisine.

In addition to the original location in Ybor City, there are Columbia restaurants in Sarasota (opened in 1959); in St. Augustine (opened in 1983); on Sand Key (1989); and in Celebration, Florida (1997). There are also smaller Columbia Café restaurants located at the Tampa Bay History Center (opened in 2009) and at Tampa International Airport (opened in May 2012).

== Wine ==
The original restaurant's wine list contains more than 1,000 wines with an inventory exceeding 50,000 bottles. The restaurant features several private-label wines and liquors created to honor family members. The popular house sangria is mixed tableside, and the recipe has dozens of posts on the internet.

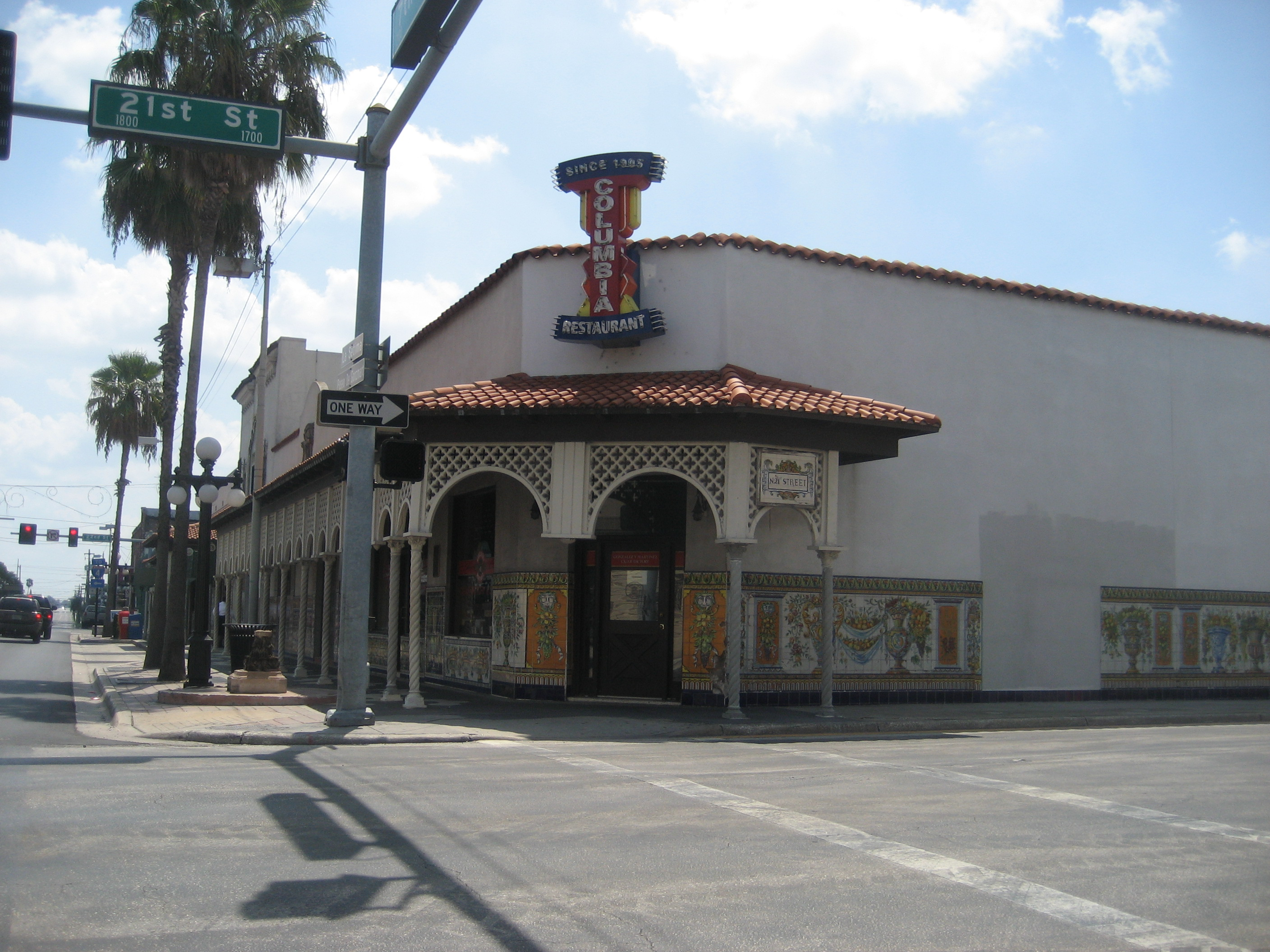
Exterior from across 7th Avenue, Ybor City

== Activities ==
=== Music ===
In the early 1950s, César Gonzmart traded his career as a musician for one as a restaurateur, but after he became general manager, he regularly serenaded his guests with his violin and orchestra. Until illness prevented it, he performed regularly and music has always been key to the dining experience. There is still live music on weekends.

=== Flamenco ===
Maria Esparza began performing flamenco dance shows at the Columbia Restaurant in 1988. She has been the show's director since 2008. She says that flamenco is not only a dance, but also art. The dancers tell the story of Spain's culture through their dancing. Esparza explains, "It's really hard what we do. The coordination is like no other. We work with our hands and the footwork, we're doing percussion with our footwork." There are dinner shows Tuesday through Saturday.

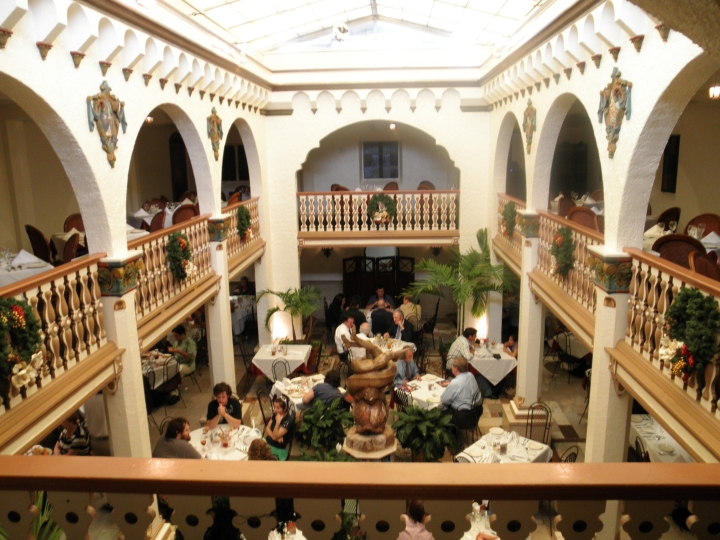
Indoor courtyard dining room, Ybor City

=== Community Harvest ===
Beginning in 1997, the Columbia Restaurant has held a monthly Community Harvest campaign during September. The chain donates 5% of all guests' lunch and dinner checks, allowing patrons to designate the charitable organizations of their choice. As of 2015, the event had generated more than $1.8 million for Florida nonprofits.

=== 1905 Day ===
For Columbia's 75th anniversary in 1980, they held a street festival, "Back to Ybor City" with an art show, entertainment with flamenco dancing and "food prices of yesterday". The restaurant celebrated "1905 Day" from 1980 to 2013. On a random September or October day, a special menu with 1905 prices was in effect from noon to 7 p.m. Hundreds of diners lined up outside before the restaurant opened for the opportunity of a great bargain. In 2014, the restaurant announced it would celebrate "1905 Day" in the future on significant anniversaries. The next 1905 day may be in 2025 for their 120th anniversary.

=== Cesar Gonzmart Memorial Golf Tournament ===
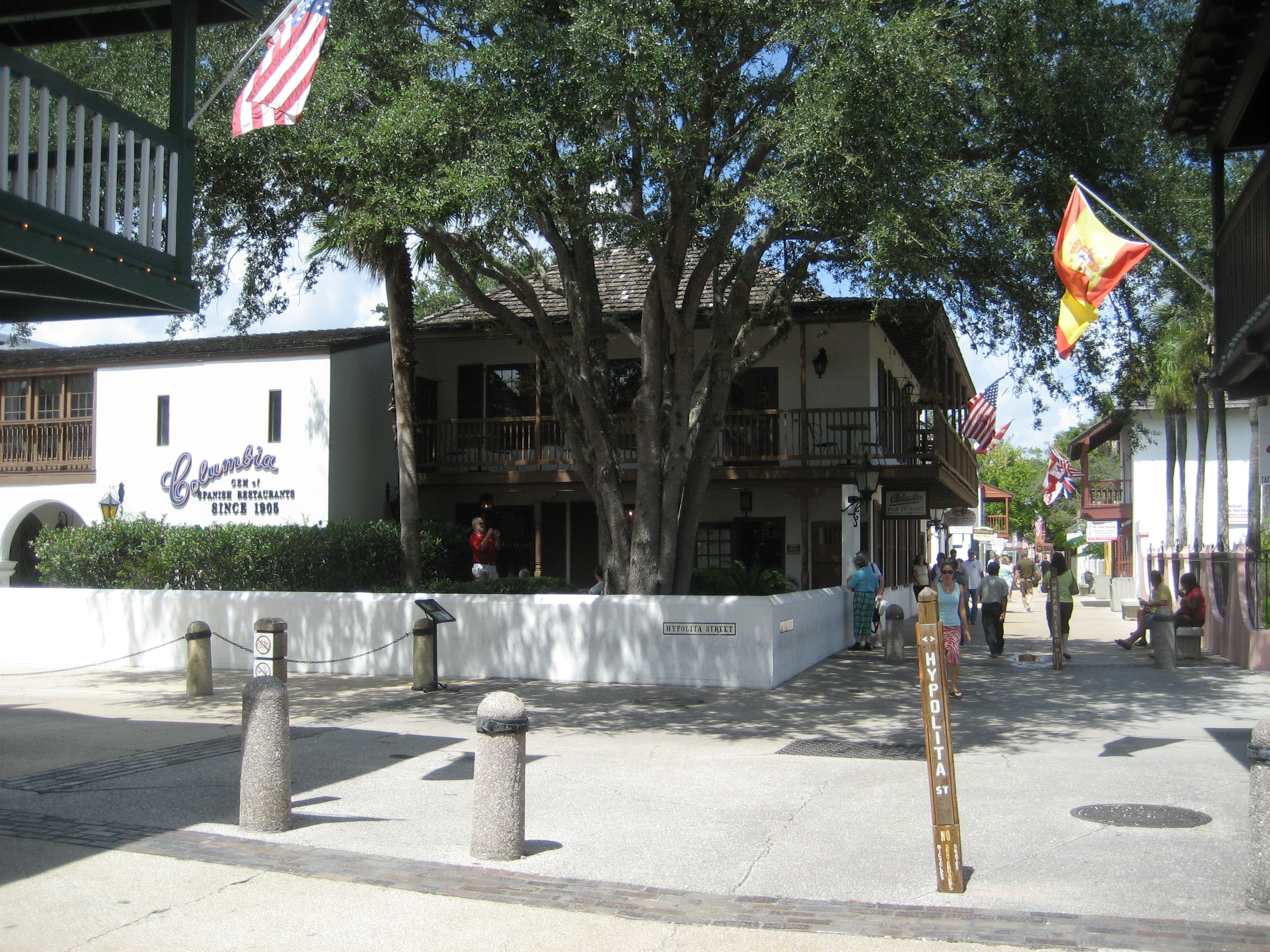
Columbia Restaurant in St. Augustine, Florida, 2007

The annual Cesar Gonzmart Memorial Golf Tournament (CGMGT) began in 1995 by Columbia Restaurant owners Richard and Casey Gonzmart in memory of their father, who died of pancreatic cancer. Proceeds from the event benefit educational programs in communities where the Columbia Restaurants are located.

Columbia Restaurant, through funds raised during the 2001 CGMGT, and the Sant 'Yago Education Foundation gave $5,000 to support the American Heart Association's American Heart Heroes Week project, an initiative that provides camp experiences for children with cardiovascular disease. The 2003 CGMGT raised over $55,000 for the H. Lee Moffitt Cancer Center & Research Institute, the University of South Florida Athletic Association, and a donation to the USF Latino Scholarship Program.

== Awards and recognitions ==
In 2009, the Columbia Restaurant was recognized as one of the 25 iconic restaurants of the Tampa-St.Petersburg area by the St. Petersburg Times. It was also listed in Nation's Restaurant News in the "Top 50 All-American icon category." The 2022 Michelin Guide for Florida rated Columbia as "Recommended".

== Books ==
- The Columbia Restaurant: Celebrating a Century of History, Culture, and Cuisine, 2009
- Best-Loved Recipes from the Columbia Restaurant, 2014

== See also ==
- List of restaurants in Tampa, Florida
- List of Spanish restaurants
