= Ybor City =

Neighborhood in Hillsborough County, Florida, US

- Neighborhood
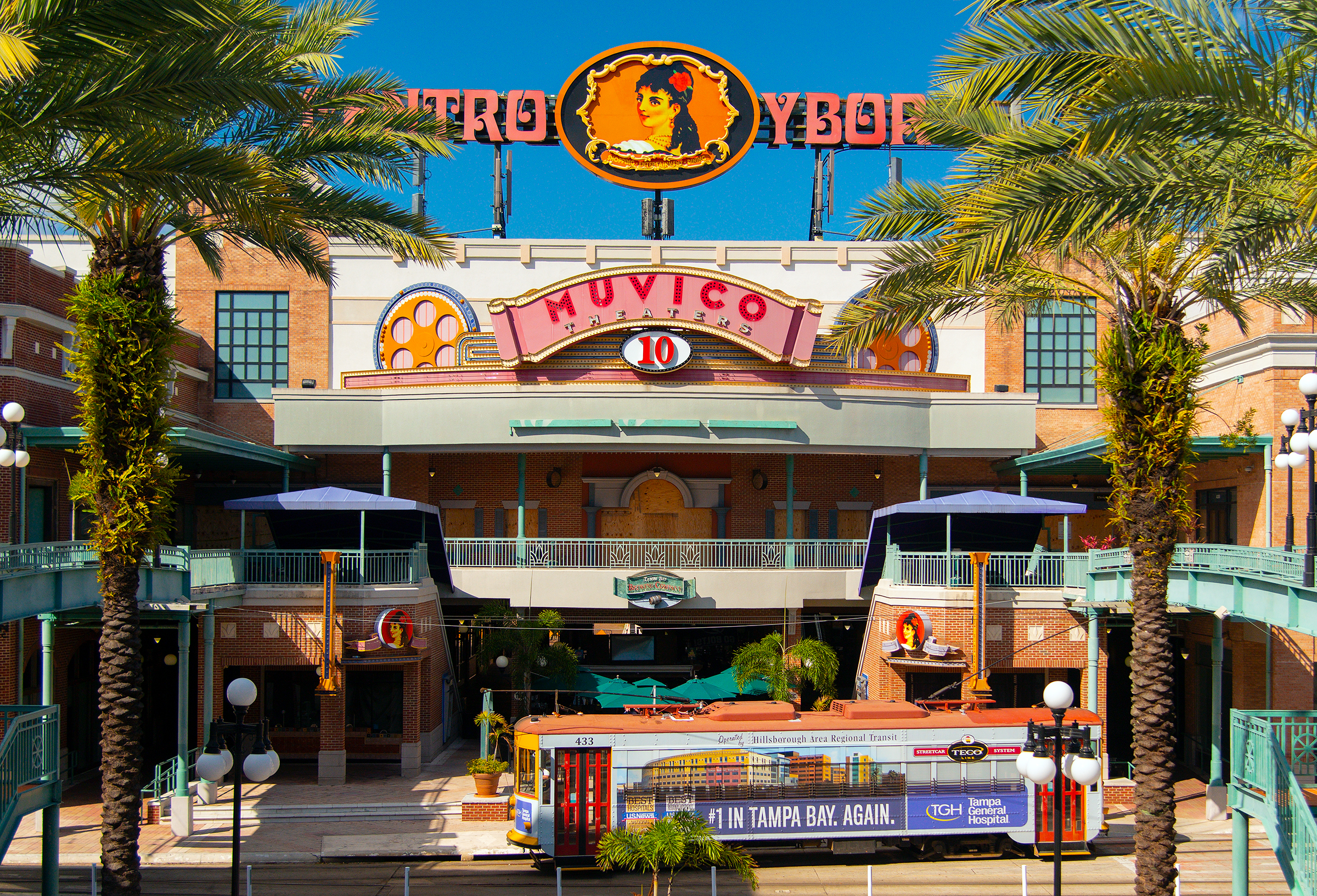
- Centro Ybor complex with a TECO Line car passing in front

- Flag
- Nickname: Florida's Latin Quarter
- Location within Florida
- Coordinates: 27°57′41″N 82°26′42″W
- Country: United States
- State: Florida
- County: Hillsborough
- City: Tampa
- Founded: 1885
- Incorporation into Tampa: 1887

Population (2020)
  - Total: 4,341
- Time zone: UTC-5 (EST)
  - Summer (DST): UTC-4 (EDT)
- Website: www.yborcityonline.com

Ybor City (/ˈiːbɔːr/ EE-bor) is a historic neighborhood just northeast of downtown Tampa, Florida, United States. It was founded in the 1880s by Vicente Martinez Ybor and other cigar manufacturers and populated by thousands of immigrants, mainly from Cuba, Spain, and Italy. For the next 50 years, workers in Ybor City's cigar factories rolled hundreds of millions of cigars annually.

The neighborhood had features unusual among contemporary communities in the south, most notably its multiethnic and multiracial population and their many mutual aid societies. The cigar industry employed thousands of well-paid workers, helping Tampa grow from an economically depressed village to a bustling city in about 20 years and giving it the nickname "Cigar City".

Ybor City grew and flourished from the 1890s until the Great Depression of the 1930s, when a drop in demand for fine cigars reduced the number of cigar factories and mechanization in the cigar industry greatly reduced employment opportunities in the neighborhood. This process accelerated after World War II, and a steady exodus of residents and businesses continued until large areas of the formerly vibrant neighborhood were virtually abandoned by the late 1970s. Attempts at redevelopment failed until the 1980s, when an influx of artists began a slow process of gentrification. In the 1990s and early 2000s, a portion of the original neighborhood around 7th Avenue developed into a nightclub and entertainment district, and many old buildings were renovated for new uses. Since then, the area's economy has diversified with more offices and residences, and the population has shown notable growth for the first time in over half a century.

Ybor City has been designated as a National Historic Landmark District, and several structures in the area are listed in the National Register of Historic Places. In 2008, 7th Avenue, Ybor City's main commercial thoroughfare, was recognized as one of the "10 Great Streets in America" by the American Planning Association. In 2010 Columbia Restaurant, which is Florida's oldest restaurant, was named a "Top 50 All-American icon" by Nation's Restaurant News magazine.

== History ==
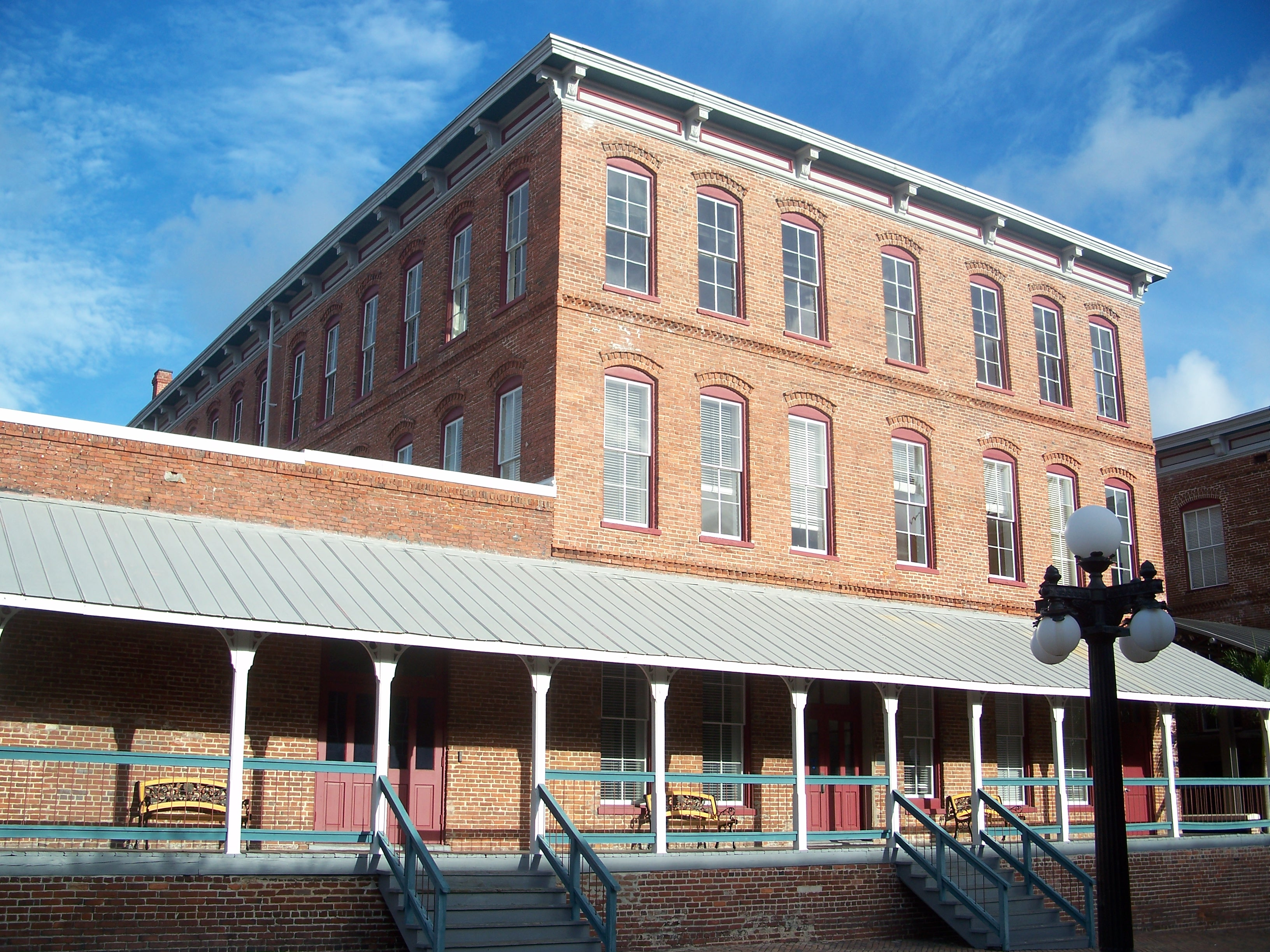
Ybor's first cigar factory

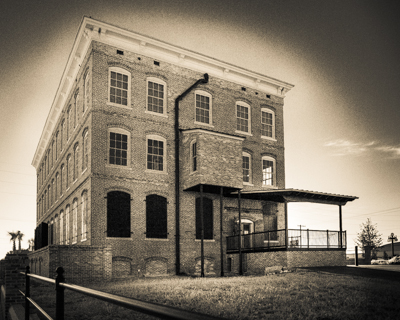
Old cigar factory in Ybor City

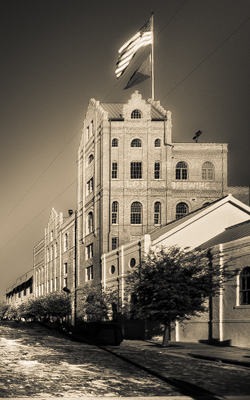
Florida Brewing building in Ybor City

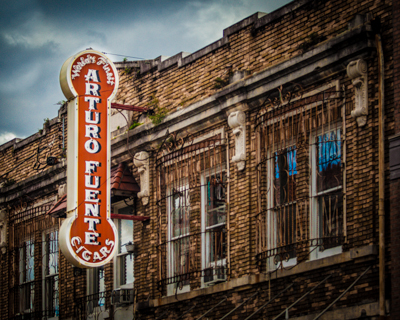
Arturo Fuente Sign in Ybor City

=== Establishment ===
In the early 1880s, Tampa was an isolated village with a population of less than 1000 and a struggling economy. However, its combination of a good port, Henry Plant's new railroad line, and humid climate attracted the attention of Vicente Martinez Ybor, a prominent Spanish cigar manufacturer.

Ybor had moved his cigar-making operation from Cuba to Key West, Florida, in 1869, due to political turmoil in the then-Spanish colony. But, labor unrest and the lack of room for expansion had him looking for another base of operations, preferably in his own company town.

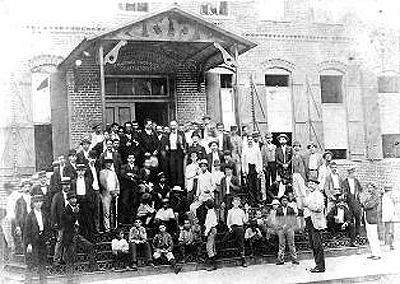
José Martí and cigar workers on the steps of V.M. Ybor's factory, 1893

Ybor considered several communities in the southern United States and decided that an area of sandy scrubland just northeast of Tampa would be the best location. In 1885, the Tampa Board of Trade helped broker an initial purchase of 40 acres (160,000 m^{2}) of land, and Ybor quickly bought more. However, Ybor City very nearly didn't happen at all. Vicente Ybor initially failed to come to an agreement with the owner of the 40 acre parcel. The Tampa Board of Trade was horrified to find that the purchase had failed and hatched a plan to get the buyer and seller back together. Vicente Ybor was sitting in the train station on his way to Jacksonville to look at more property when the Board of Trade (a group of five, one of whom was Frederick Salomonson, future 3-time mayor of Tampa) arrived and persuaded Ybor to reconsider and the deal went forward from there, the birth of Ybor City.

Cigar making was a specialized trade, and Tampa did not possess a workforce able to man the new factories. To attract employees, Ybor built hundreds of small houses for the coming influx of mainly Cuban and Spanish cigar workers, many of whom followed him from Key West and Cuba. Other cigar manufacturers, drawn by incentives provided by Ybor to further increase the labor pool, also moved in, quickly making Tampa a major cigar production center.

Italians were also among the early settlers of Ybor City. Most of them came from a few villages in southwestern Sicily. The villages were Santo Stefano Quisquina, Alessandria della Rocca, Bivona, Cianciana, and Contessa Entellina. Sixty percent of them came from Santo Stefano Quisquina. Before settling in Ybor City, many first worked in the sugar cane plantations in St. Cloud, central Florida. Some came by way of Louisiana. A number of families migrated from New Orleans after the lynching of eleven Italians in 1891 during the "Mafia Riot". Italians mostly brought their entire families with them, unlike other immigrants. The foreign-born Italian population of Tampa grew from 56 in 1890 to 2,684 in 1940. Once arriving in Ybor City, Italians settled mainly in the eastern and southern fringes of the city. The area was referred to as La Pachata, after a Cuban rent collector in that area. It was also called "Little Italy".

Unlike Cubans and Spaniards, the Italians arrived in the cigar town without cigar-making skills. When the early Italians entered the factories, it was at the bottom of the ladder, positions which did not involve handling tobacco. Working beside unskilled Cubans, mainly Afro-Cubans, they swept and hauled and were porters and doorkeepers. In time, many did become cigar workers, including Italian women. The majority of the Italian women worked as cigar strippers in 1900, an undesirable position mainly held by women who could find nothing else. However, eventually many of them became skilled cigar makers, earning more than the male Italian cigar makers. Other Italian immigrants started small businesses built around the cigar industry, such as cafés, food stores, restaurants, and boardinghouses.

The least known of the immigrants that came to Ybor City are the Germans, the Romanian Jews, and the Chinese. The Chinese and Jews were employed mainly in service trades and retail businesses. The Germans arrived after the 1890s, and most were businessmen. In the cigar factories, they worked as managers, bookkeepers, and supervisors. Cigar boxes were made by German-owned factories. Several early cigar box labels were made by German lithographers. The Germans formed their own club, the Deutsch Amerikanischer Verein. The club building is still standing on Nebraska and 11th Avenue. It contained a restaurant open to the public that served German food. In 1919, because of anti-German feelings from World War I, they sold the building to the Young Men's Hebrew Association. The building is now used as offices for the City of Tampa.

In 1887, Tampa annexed the neighborhood. By 1900, the rough frontier settlement of wooden buildings and sandy streets had been transformed into a bustling town with brick buildings and streets, a streetcar line, and many social and cultural opportunities. Largely due to the growth of Ybor City, Tampa's population had jumped to almost 16,000.

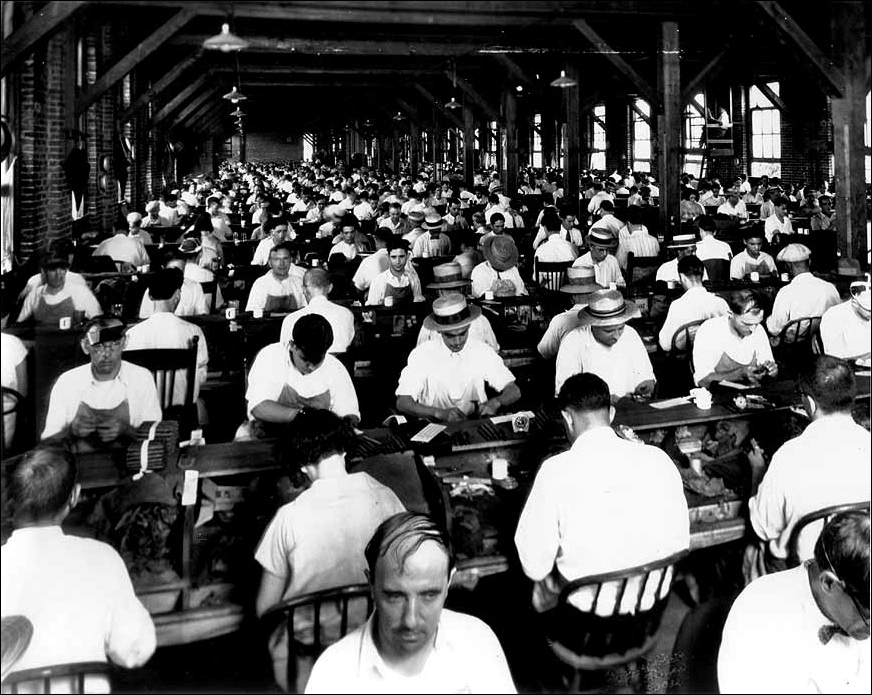
Inside an Ybor City cigar factory ca. 1920

=== The Golden Age ===
Ybor City grew and prospered during the first decades of the 20th century. Thousands of residents built a community that combined Cuban, Spanish, Italian, and Jewish culture. "Ybor City is Tampa's Spanish India," observed a visitor to the area, "What a colorful, screaming, shrill, and turbulent world."

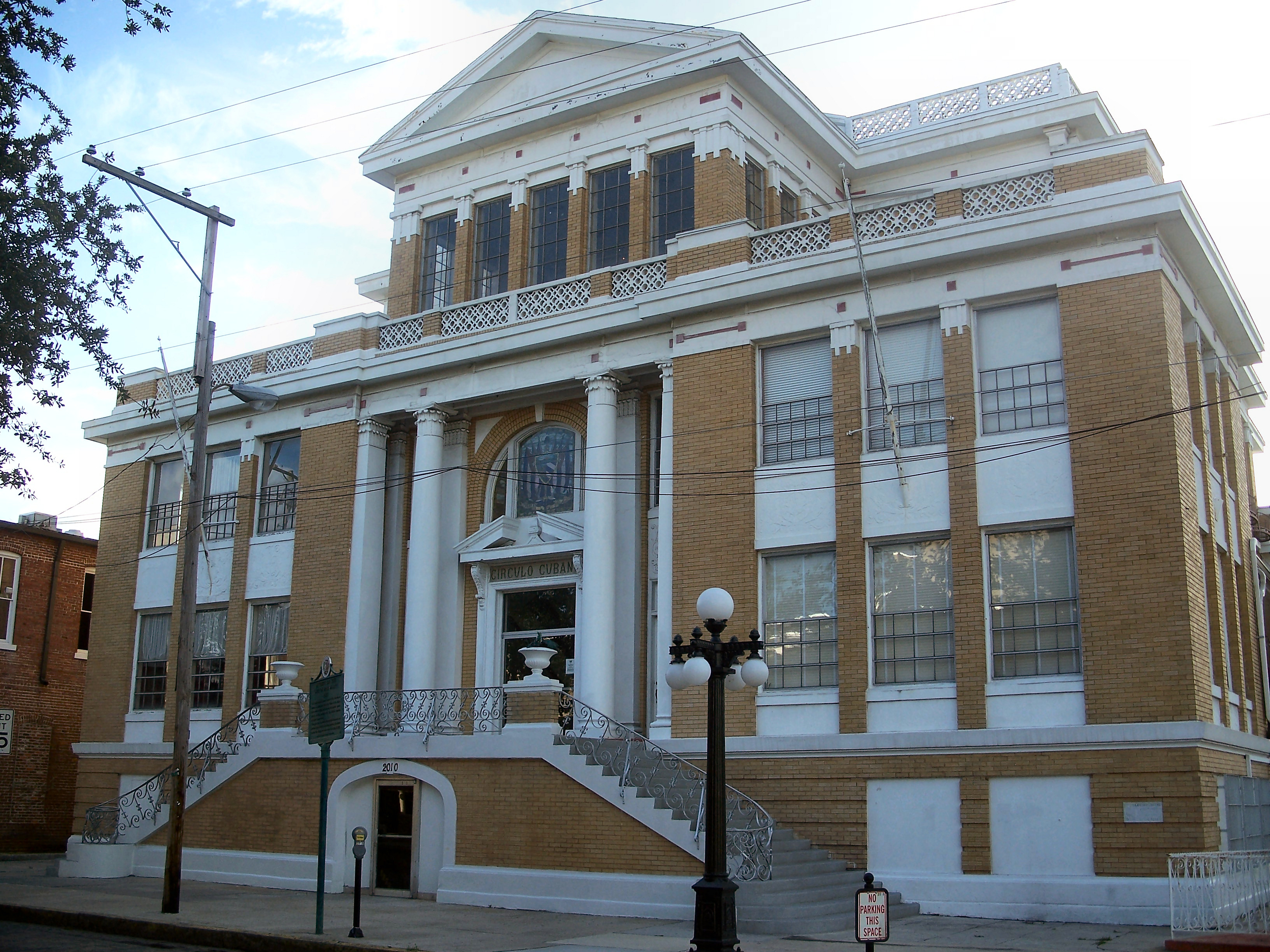
Circulo Cubano de Tampa, one of Ybor City's social clubs

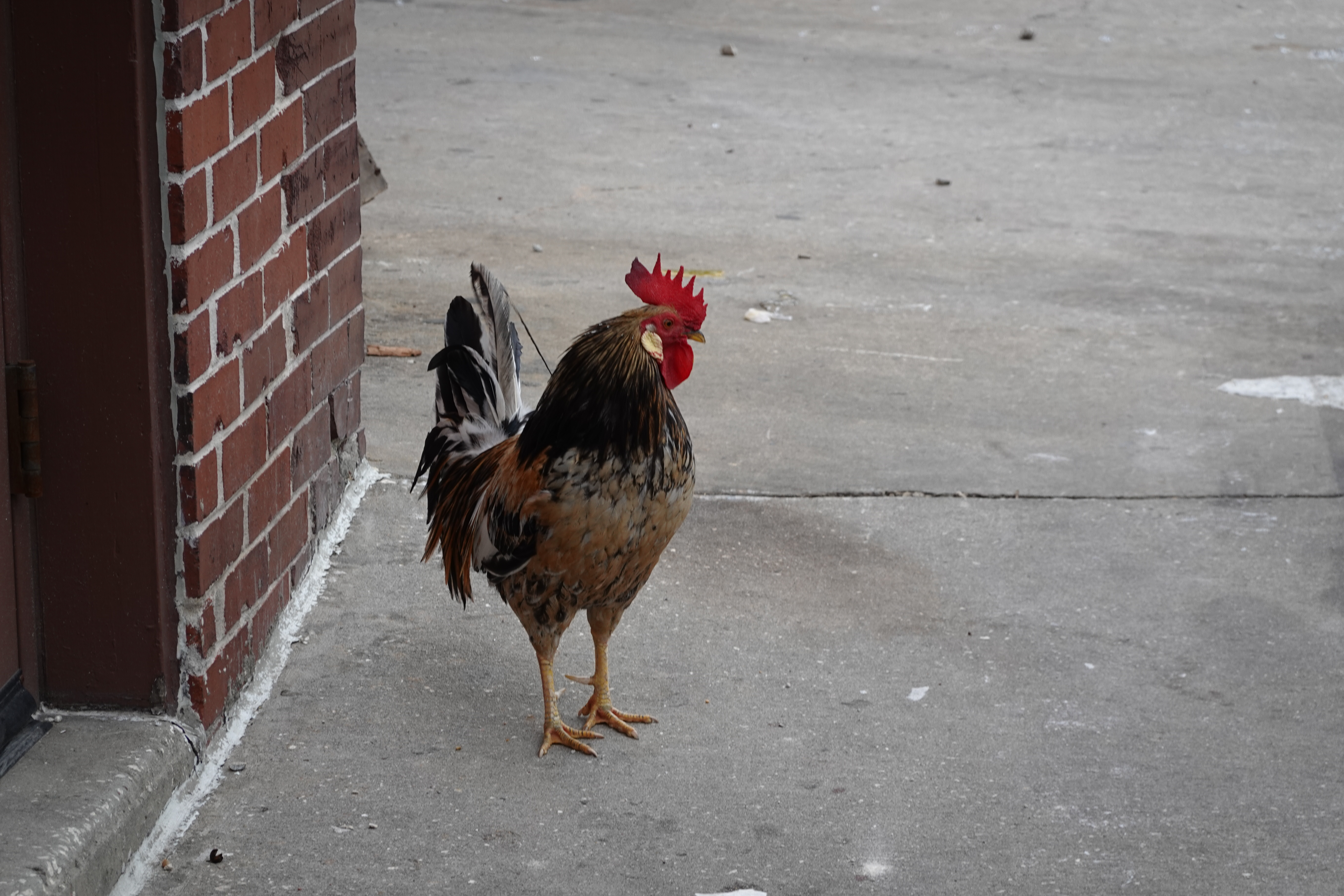
One of the many roosters roaming free in Ybor City, 2019

An aspect of life were the mutual aid societies built and sustained mainly by ordinary citizens. These clubs were founded in Ybor's early days (the first was the Centro Español, established in 1891) and were run on dues collected from their members, usually 5% of a member's salary. In exchange, members and their whole family received services including free libraries, educational programs, sports teams, restaurants, numerous social functions like dances and picnics, and free medical services. Beyond the services, these clubs served as extended families and communal gathering places for generations of Ybor's citizens.

There were clubs for each ethnic division in the community – the Deutscher-Americaner Club (for German and eastern Europeans), L'Unione Italiana (for Italians), El Circulo Cubano (for light-skinned Cubans), La Union Marti-Maceo (for Afro-Cubans), El Centro Español (for Spaniards), and the largest, El Centro Asturiano, which accepted members from any ethnic group

Though there was little overt racism inside the diverse neighborhood, Florida's Jim Crow laws forbade Afro-Cubans from belonging to the same social organization as their more European-looking countrymen. Sometimes differences in skin color within the same family made joining the same Cuban club impossible. In general, the rivalries between all the clubs were friendly, and families were known to switch affiliations depending on which one offered preferred services and events.

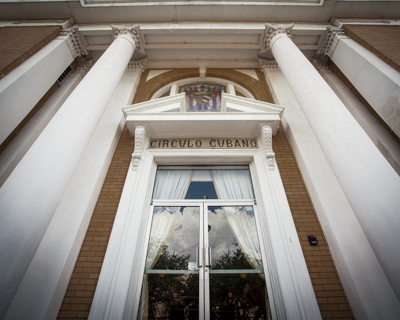
Cuban Club in Ybor City

Cigar production reached its peak in 1929, when 500 million cigars were rolled in the factories of Ybor City. Not coincidentally, that was also the year that the Great Depression began.

During the 1920s, organized crime families thrived in both Tampa and Ybor. Aside from bootlegging, the Ybor mafia ran numerous numbers rackets, called bolita. By 1927, there were over 300 bolita houses in Ybor City.

=== Decline and rebirth ===
The Depression was a major blow to cigar manufacturers. Worldwide demand plummeted as consumers sought to cut costs by switching to less-expensive cigarettes, and factories responded by laying off workers or shutting down. This trend continued throughout the 1930s as the remaining cigar factories gradually switched from traditional hand-rolled manufacturing to cheaper mechanized methods, further reducing the number of jobs and the salaries paid to workers.

After World War II, many returning veterans chose to leave Ybor City due to a lack of well-paying jobs and a US Veterans Administration home loan program that was only applicable to new homes, of which there were few in the neighborhood. In fact, the home stock was aging poorly, as many of the structures built in the early days of Ybor City were still in use.

As the historic neighborhood continued to empty out and deteriorate through the 1950s and 1960s, the federal Urban Renewal program sought to revitalize the area by demolishing older structures and encouraging new residential and commercial development. The demolition took place, but due to a lack of funds, the redevelopment did not happen. The primary legacy of the program was blocks of vacant lots which remained empty for decades. The construction of Interstate 4 through the center of the neighborhood during this period also resulted in the destruction of many buildings and cut most of the north–south routes through the area.

By the early 1970s, very few businesses and residents remained, most notably the Columbia Restaurant and a few other businesses along 7th Avenue.

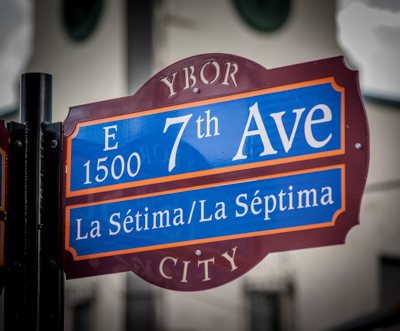
7th Ave Sign in Ybor City

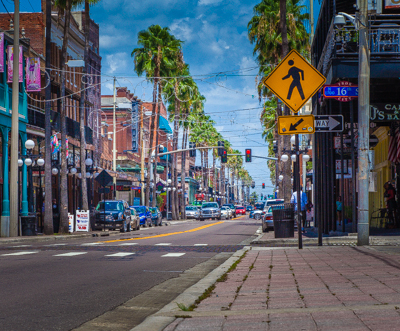
7th Ave Ybor City

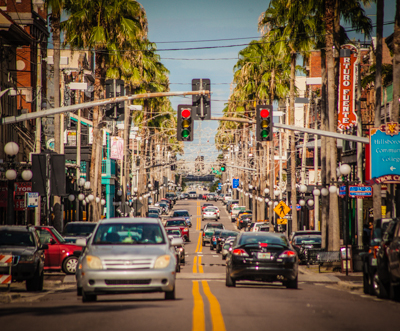
Traffic in Ybor City

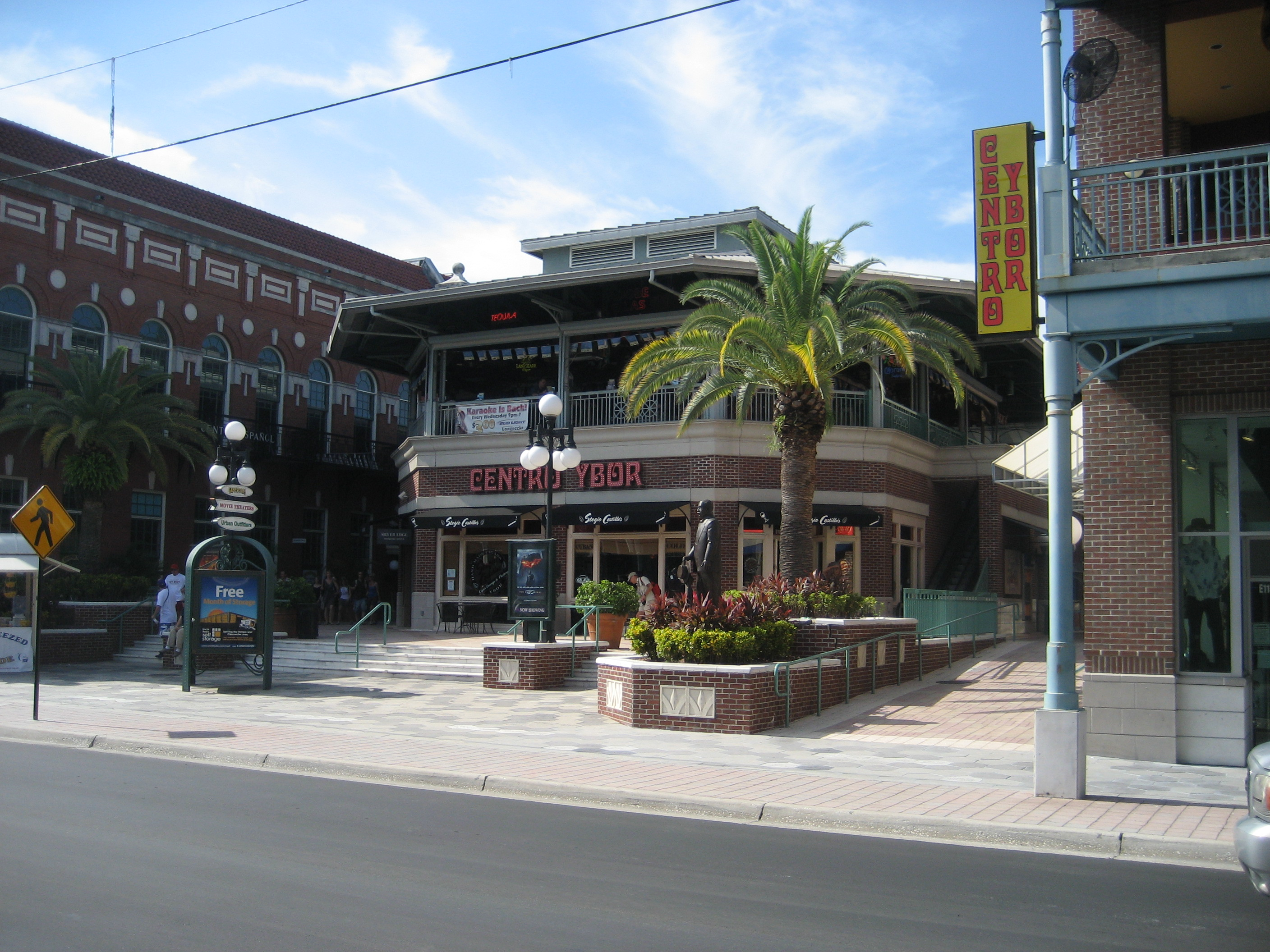
Centro Ybor, a restored shopping area on 7th Ave

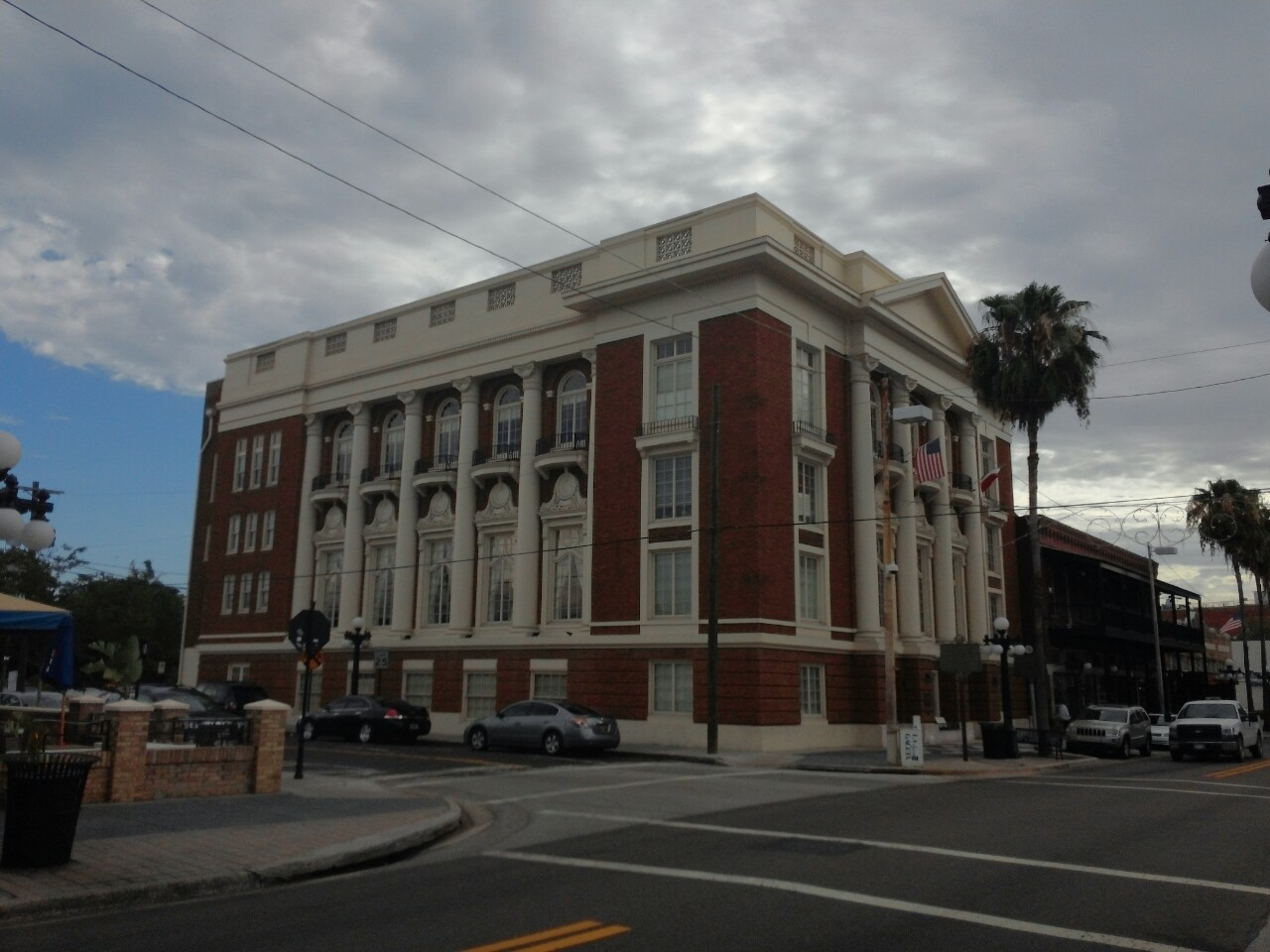
The Italian Club of Tampa - 2014

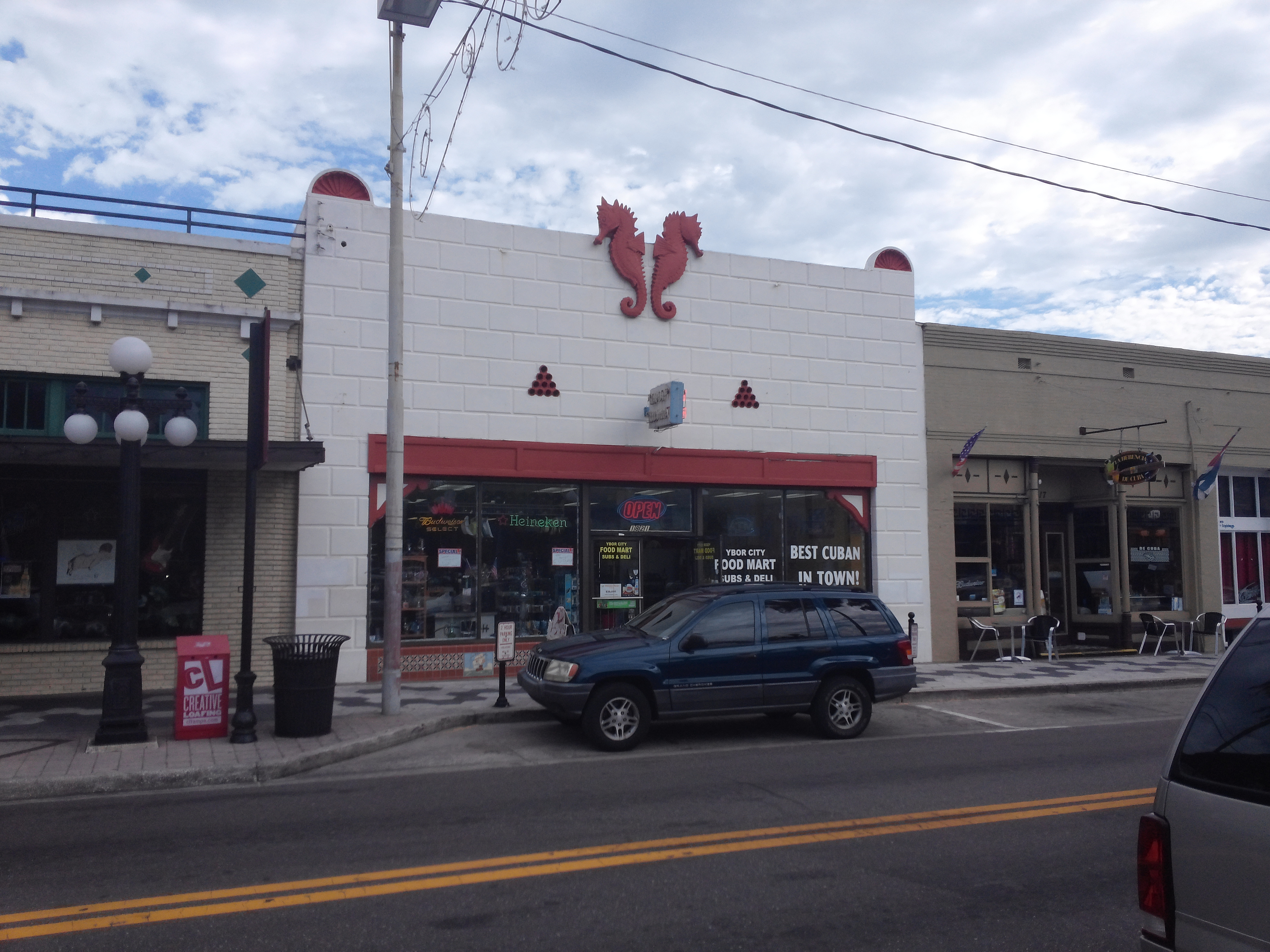
Ybor City Food Mart - 2014

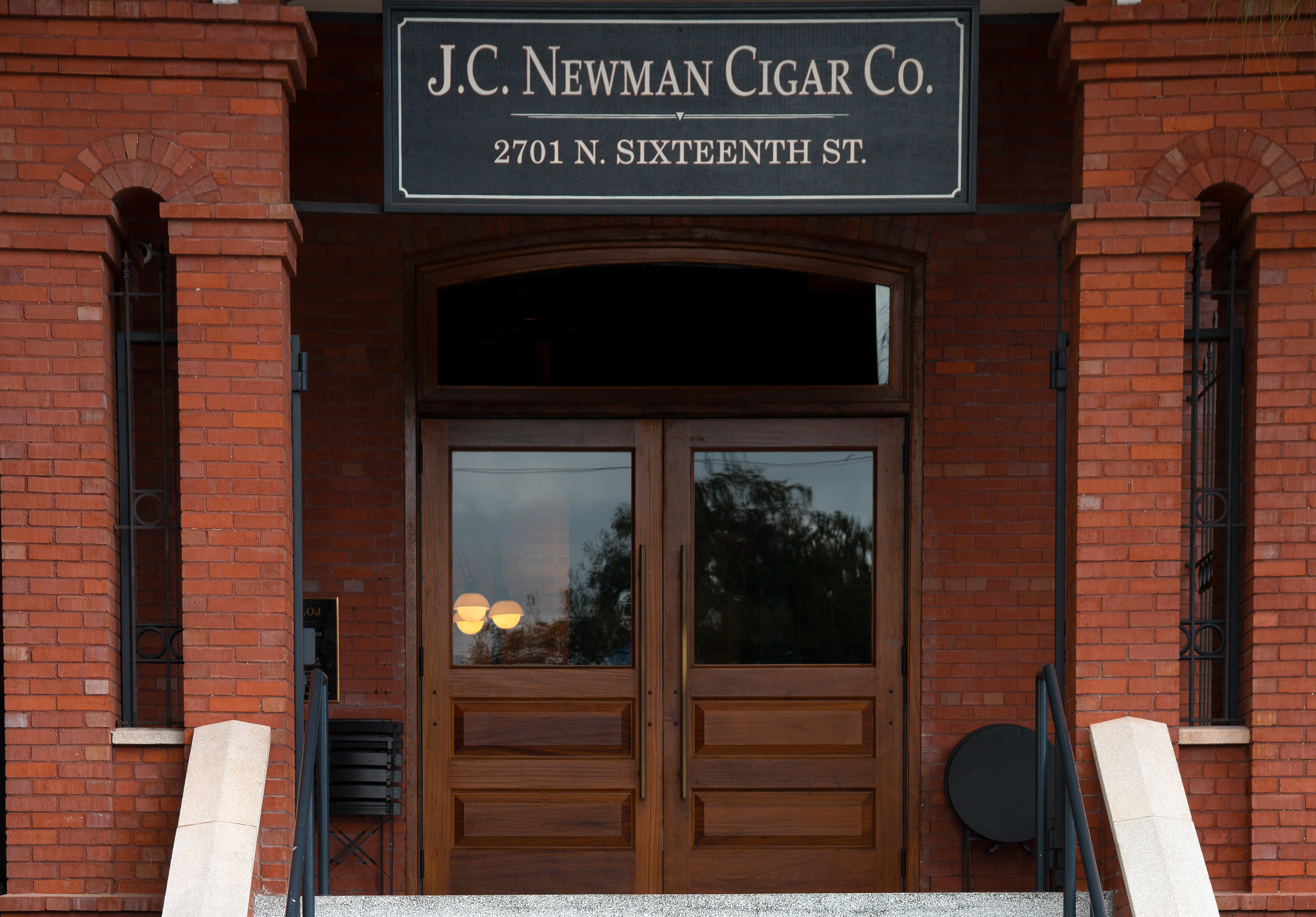
The J.C. Newman cigar factory - 2023

==== Recovery ====
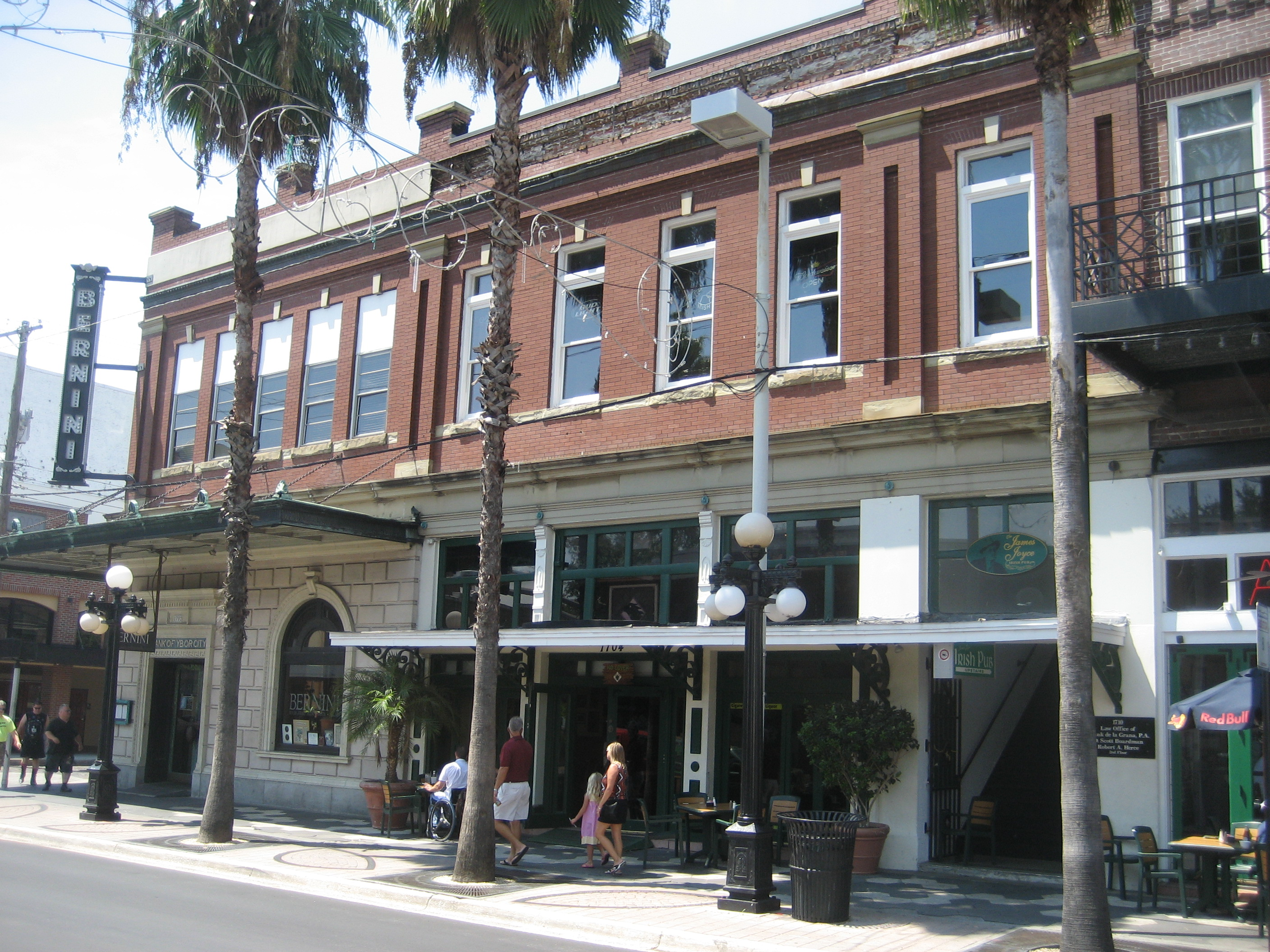
Businesses on 7th Avenue

In the early 1980s, an influx of artists seeking interesting and inexpensive studio quarters started a slow recovery, followed by a period of commercial gentrification. By the early 1990s, many of the old long-empty brick buildings on 7th Avenue had been converted into bars, restaurants, nightclubs, and other nightlife attractions. Traffic grew so much that the city built parking garages and closed 7th Ave. to traffic to deal with the visitors.

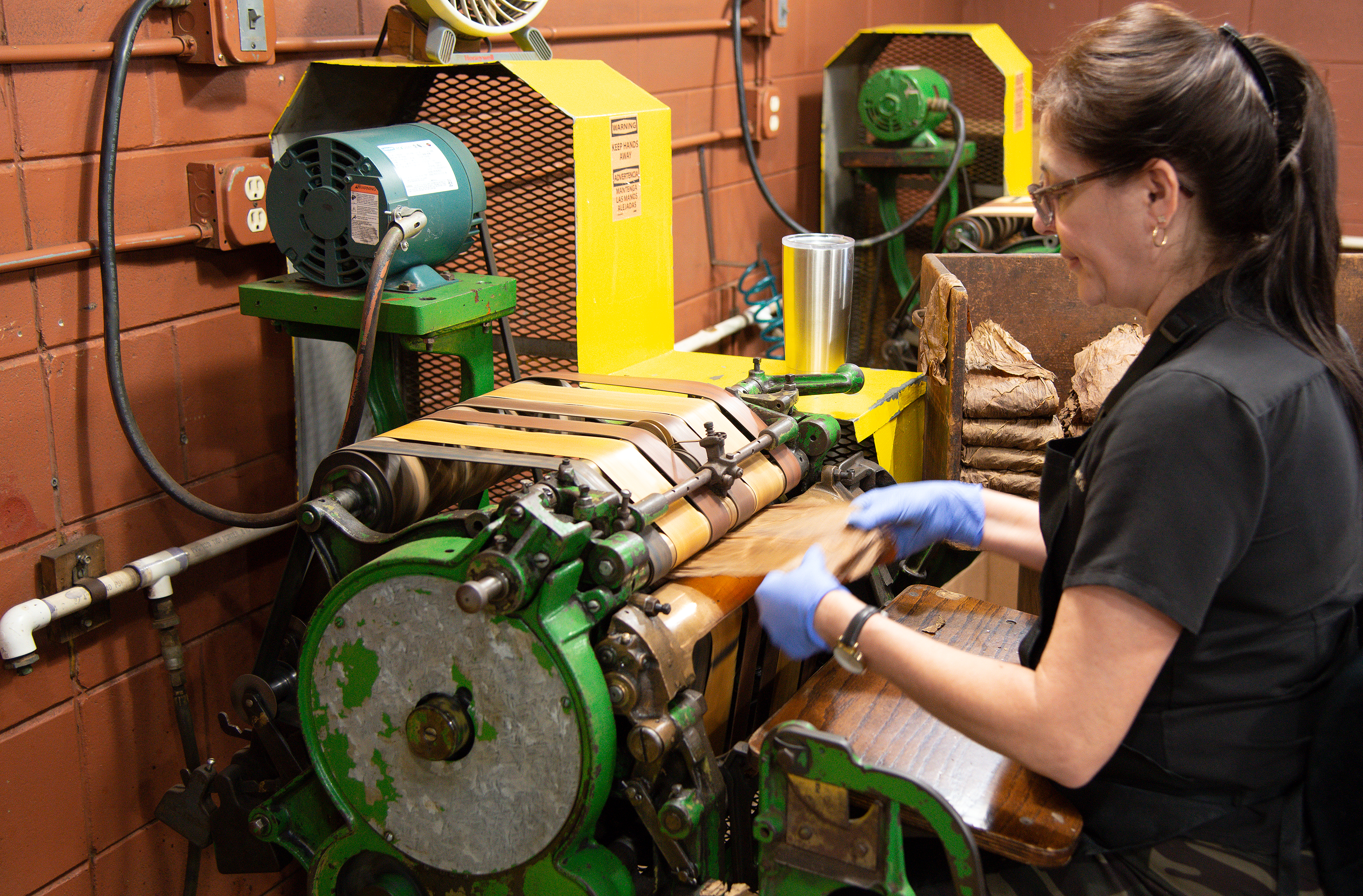
As of 2023, the JC Newman company continued to manufacture cigars, using 1930s machines

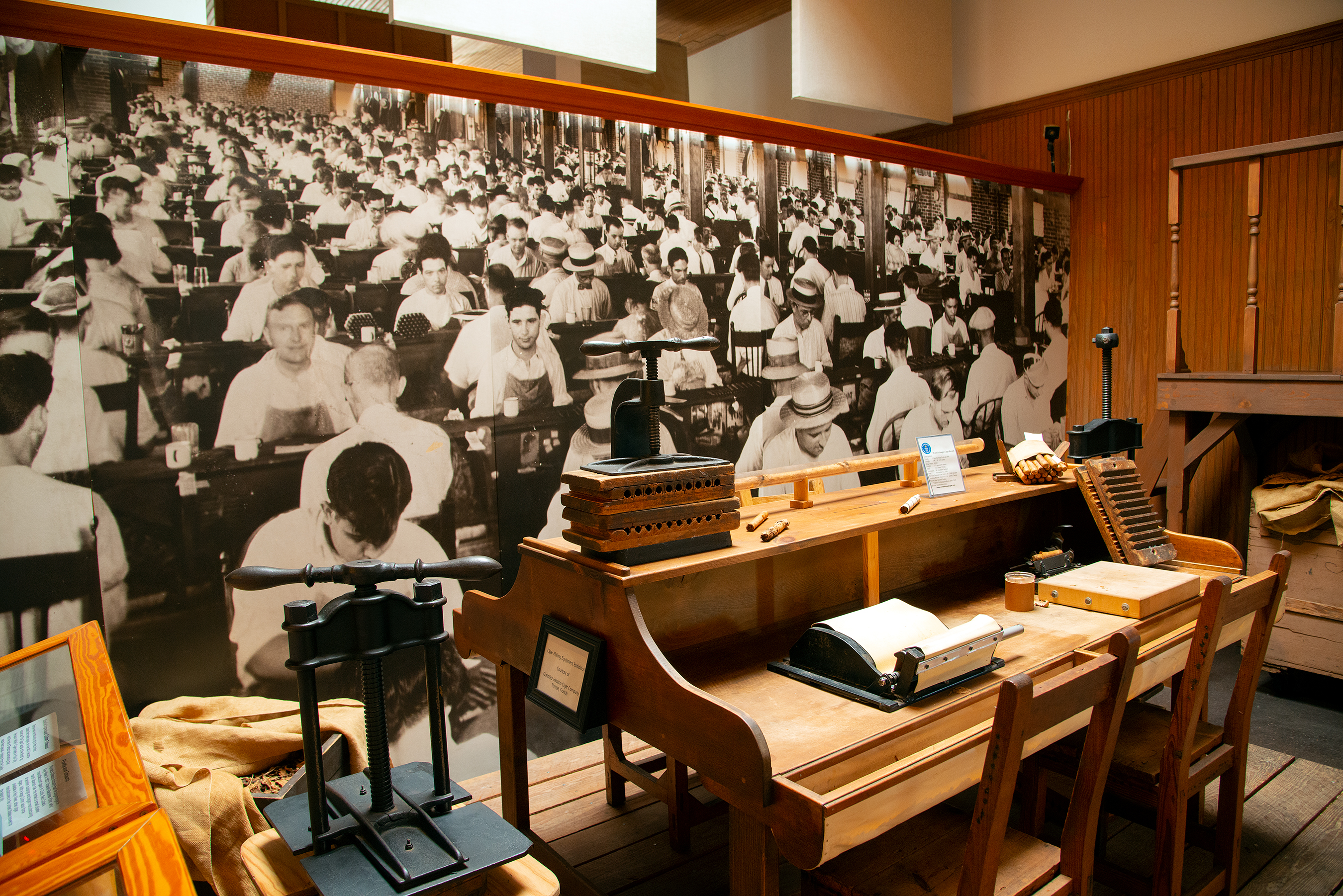
Cigar making display, Ybor City Museum State Park

Since around 2000, the city of Tampa and the Ybor City Chamber of Commerce have encouraged a broader emphasis in development. With financial help from the city, Centro Ybor, a family-oriented shopping complex and movie theater, opened in the former home of the Centro Español social club. The Florida Brewing Company building was restored into a commercial building in 2001. New apartments, condominiums and a hotel have been built on long-vacant lots, and old buildings have been restored and converted into residences and hotels. New residents began moving into Ybor City for the first time in many years. The blocks surrounding 7th Avenue also thrive with restaurants, nightlife and shopping. Reflecting the district's status as a party destination, Ybor City is referenced extensively in the lyrics of Brooklyn-based rock band The Hold Steady. The song "Killer Parties", for instance, contains the line "Ybor City is très speedy, but they throw such killer parties." In May 2009 Swedish super-retailer IKEA opened its long-awaited Tampa location in the southern edge of Ybor City.

The local museum is the Ybor City Museum State Park in the former Ferlita Bakery building (originally La Joven Francesca) building on 9th Avenue. Tours of the gardens and the "casitas" (small homes of cigar company workers) are provided by a ranger. Exhibits, period photos and a video cover the founding of Ybor City and the cigar making industry.

== Boundaries ==
Historically, the boundaries of "Greater Ybor City" stretched from Tampa Bay on the south to Dr. Martin Luther King Jr. Blvd. (formerly Buffalo Avenue) on the north, and from Nebraska Avenue on the west to 40th Street on the east. This eventually included all of today's neighborhoods of Historic Ybor, East Ybor, VM Ybor, and Ybor Heights plus a portion of East Tampa. The Ybor City Historic District encompasses the central portion of that area, approximately straddling Interstate 4, which bisected the neighborhood in the 1960s.

The official boundaries of the Historic Ybor neighborhood are I-4 to the north, 22nd Street to the east, Adamo Drive to the south, and Nebraska Avenue to the west. The area of this district is about 1 square mile (about 2.6 km^{2}). Though modern Ybor City also includes some of the surrounding area, its exact dimensions are loosely defined and subject to debate.

== Population ==
At the height of its life as a thriving immigrant community, Ybor City's population was numbered in the tens of thousands. In the lowest point in the late 1970s, perhaps 1000 residents called the neighborhood home.

In recent years, the numbers have begun to climb once more. Ybor City's population grew an estimated 42.5% between 2000 and 2003, mainly as a result of new condominium and apartment construction. As of 2003, approximately 2,900 residents lived in the area.

== Economy and land use ==
Ybor City is one of the oldest sections of Tampa and is almost entirely an urban, built-up area. Commercial property comprises almost 50% of the land, institutional use (including the Hillsborough County Sheriff's Operations Center and a satellite campus of Hillsborough Community College) 16%, residential use about 23%, and industrial use about 7%

According to a 2003 survey, the top five business types in the area were professional services (22.8%), retail (18.4%), manufacturing (14.0%), wholesale/distribution (13.2%), and restaurants & bars (11.4%).

== Transportation ==
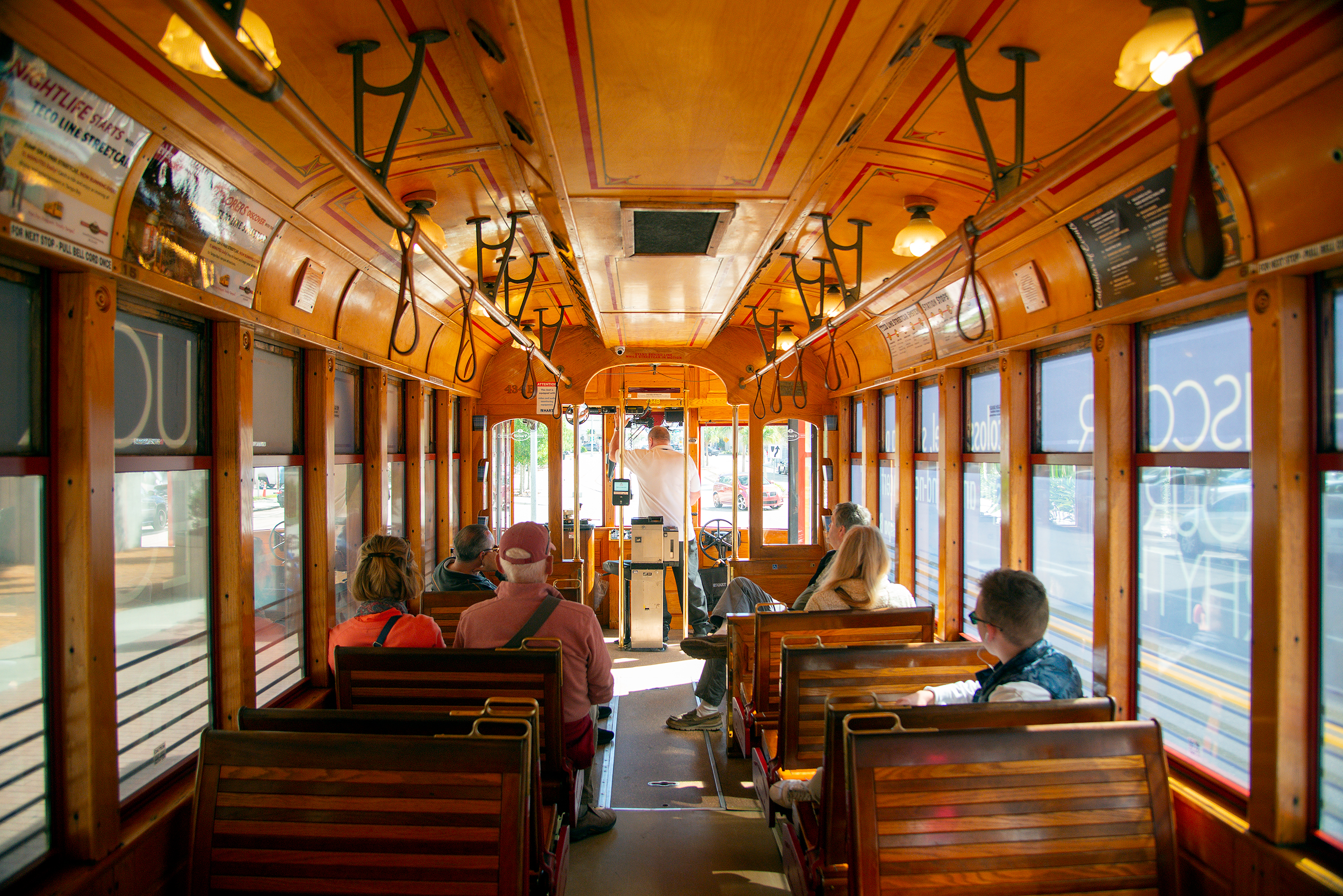
Interior of TECO trolley streetcar

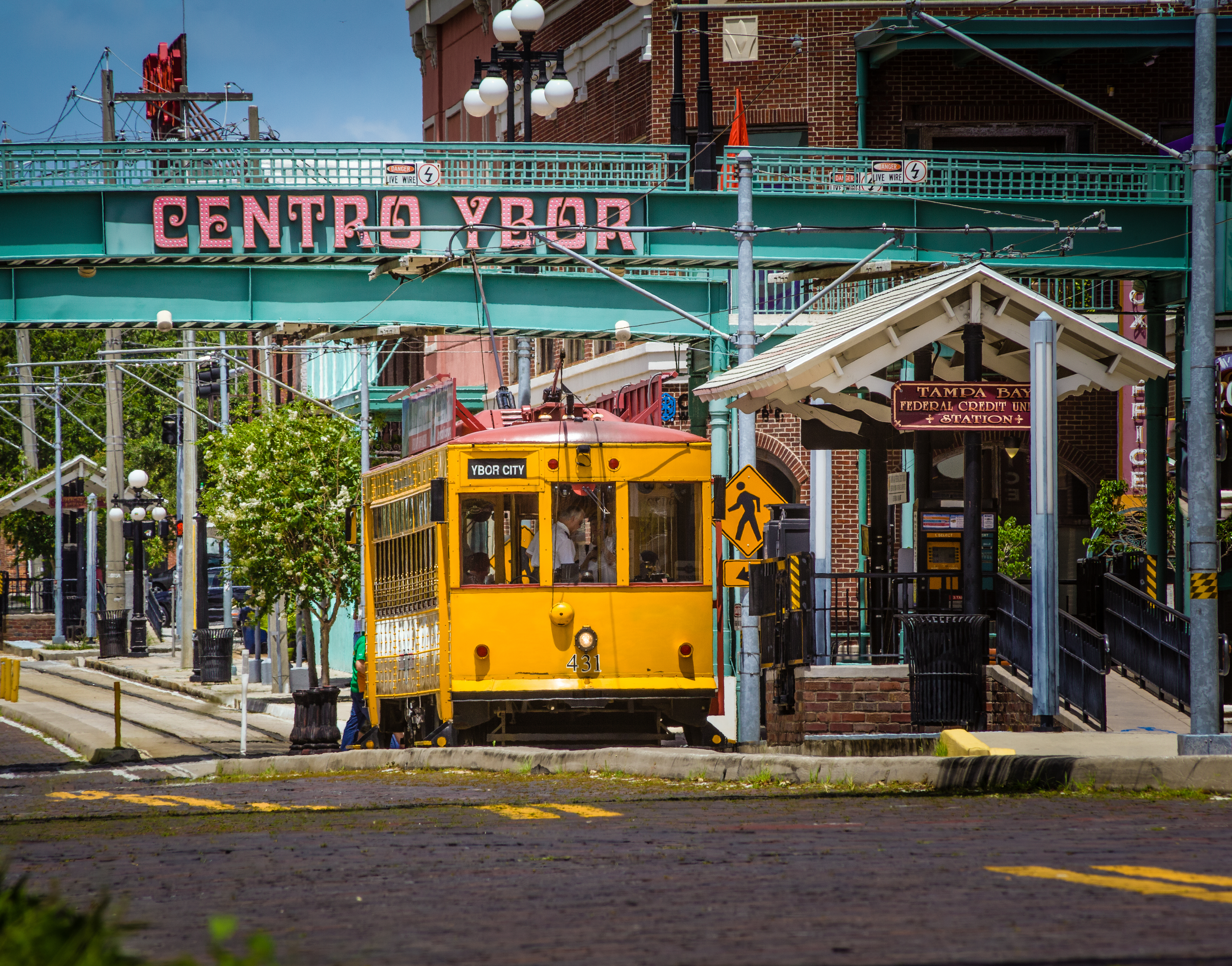
Trolley in Ybor City

For the most part, Ybor City still uses the gridded street system laid out by Gavino Gutierrez in 1885. Many roadways are now paved with modern materials, though a few brick streets remain.

Because 21st and 22nd Streets, which cut north–south through the area, were once the main traffic routes between Interstate 4 and the Port of Tampa Bay, there was a large volume of semi-trailer truck traffic funneling through the historic district for many years. This caused damage to narrow city roads, was a danger to pedestrians, and sometimes resulted in trucks colliding with historic buildings. In 2014, the elevated I-4/Selmon Expressway Connector was built to siphon heavy truck traffic away from the historic district.

The TECO Line Streetcar, which links Ybor City, the Channelside District and Downtown Tampa, began operating in October 2002. The Hillsborough Area Regional Transit Authority (HARTline) operates the streetcars as well as the bus system. Small startups have also begun utilizing NEVs to shuttle passengers between Tampa's core neighborhoods including Ybor.

== Museums ==
- Cigar Museum And Visitor Center, Ybor City
- Ybor City Museum State Park
- TECO Line Streetcar Museum
- Tampa Baseball Museum

== Annual events ==
- Sant'Yago Knight Parade (sometimes known as Gasparilla Night Parade) - usually held two weeks after the Gasparilla Pirate Festival in mid to late February
- Guavaween - daytime events and nighttime parade in October, named for Tampa's "The Big Guava" nickname
- Historic Ybor City's Annual Tree Lighting Ceremony - began in 2010 and held each year in November

== Notable people ==
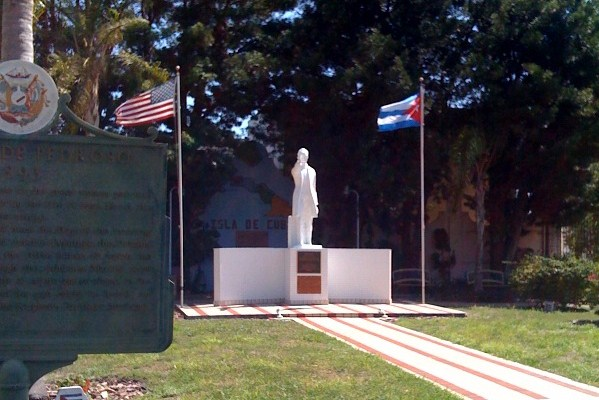
Monument to José Martí in Ybor City

- Braulio Alonso, first Hispanic president of the National Education Association
- Dick Greco, multi-term mayor of Tampa
- Evelio Grillo, writer and community organizer
- Marcelino Huerta, College Football Hall of Fame coach
- KJ-52, influential Christian hip-hop artist, whose debut album was named 7th Avenue after Ybor City's main commercial street
- Joe Lala, musician and actor
- Victor Licata, axe murderer whose 1933 killings influenced the idea that marijuana causes criminal insanity
- Al López, first Tampa native to play Major League Baseball, manage a major league team, and be inducted into the Baseball Hall of Fame
- Baldomero Lopez, Medal of Honor recipient during the Korean War
- Nick Nuccio, first Italian mayor of Tampa
- Ferdie Pacheco, boxing personality, artist, and author
- Frank Ragano, "mob lawyer", author
- Santo Trafficante Jr., alleged Mafia boss of the Tampa Area.
- Jose Yglesias, author
- Cesar Gonzmart concert violinist and entertainer, Spanish "nobleman" and energetic chairman of the $42 million Columbia Restaurant Group

== In popular culture ==
=== Literature ===
- Ybor City natives Jose Yglesias and Ferdie Pacheco have each written several books and stories set in their hometown. Most notably, Yglesias' debut novel is entitled A Wake in Ybor City, while Pacheco's memoir of his early life is called Ybor City Chronicles.
- Anna in the Tropics, the winner of the 2003 Pulitzer Prize for Drama written by Nilo Cruz, is set in the cigar factories of Ybor City.
- Ybor City and Tampa are prominently featured in the novels Live by Night and its sequel World Gone By by Dennis Lehane.

=== Film ===
- The 2016 film Live by Night (based on the books of Dennis Lehane) is centered on an Ybor City bootlegger who becomes a notorious gangster during Prohibition. The crime drama was written, directed, and co-produced by Ben Affleck, who also played the starring role. Although the movie is almost entirely set in Tampa during the early 1930s, much of it was shot in and around Brunswick, Georgia due to movie production tax incentives offered by the state of Georgia and the town's proximity to Affleck's home. Ybor City-inspired signage and decorations were added to buildings in downtown Brunswick, and several new buildings based on locations in Tampa were constructed on empty lots to add to the "fake Ybor City" setting.

== See also ==
- Channelside
- Downtown Tampa
- Hyde Park
- SoHo
- Tampa Heights, historic neighborhood bordered to the northwest
- West Tampa, historic district a few miles northwest with similar Cuban roots.
- Ybor cigar makers' strike of 1931
