= Lowry Park Central =

- Neighborhood
- Location within the state of Florida
- Coordinates: 28°1′39″N 82°28′15″W
- Country: United States
- State: Florida
- County: Hillsborough
- City: Tampa

Population (2010)
  - Total: 3,125
- Time zone: UTC-5 (Eastern (EST))
  - Summer (DST): UTC-4 (EDT)
- ZIP codes: 33603 and 33604

Lowry Park Central is a neighborhood within the city limits of Tampa, Florida. As of the 2010 census the neighborhood had a population of 3,125. The ZIP Codes serving the neighborhood are 33603 and 33604. The district includes ZooTampa at Lowry Park.

== Geography ==
Lowry Park Central boundaries are Riverbend to the south, Lowry Park North to the north, Sulphur Springs to the northeast, the Seminole Heights area to the southeast and the Armenia Gardens Estates to the west.

== Demographics ==
Source: Hillsborough County Atlas

As of the census of 2010, there were 3,125 people and 1,283 households residing in the neighborhood. The population density was 3,870/mi^{2}. The racial makeup of the neighborhood was 74% White, 11% African American, 0% Native American, 4% Asian, 7% from other races, and 4% from two or more races. Hispanic or Latino of any race were 44% of the population.

There were 1,283 households, out of which 23% had children under the age of 18 living with them, 36% were married couples living together, 14% had a female householder with no husband present, and 8% were non-families. 36% of all households were made up of individuals.

In the neighborhood the population was spread out, with 22% under the age of 18, 19% from 18 to 34, 22% from 35 to 49, 23% from 50 to 64, and 17% who were 65 years of age or older. For every 100 females, there were 100.7 males.

The per capita income for the neighborhood was $16,369. About 18% of the population were below the poverty line, including 15% of those under age 18 and 15% of those age 65 or over.

== Education ==
The schools serving this area are as follows:

- Forest Hills Elementary
- Oak Grove Elementary
- Adams Middle School
- Memorial Middle School
- Chamberlain High School

== See also ==
- Neighborhoods in Tampa, Florida
