= Lowry Park North =

- Neighborhood
- Location within the state of Florida
- Coordinates: 28°1′12″N 82°28′19″W
- Country: United States
- State: Florida
- County: Hillsborough
- City: Tampa
- Elevation: 23 ft (7.0 m)

Population (2010)
  - Total: 5,936
- Time zone: UTC-5 (Eastern (EST))
  - Summer (DST): UTC-4 (EDT)
- ZIP codes: 33604 and 33612

Lowry Park North is a neighborhood within the city limits of Tampa, Florida. As of the 2010 census the neighborhood had a population of 5,936. The ZIP Codes serving the neighborhood are 33604 and 33612. The elevation is 23 feet above sea level.

== Geography ==
Lowry Park North boundaries are Forest Hills to the north, Carrollwood to the west, Sulphur Springs to the east and Lowry Park to the south.

== Demographics ==
Source: Hillsborough County Atlas

As of the census of 2010, there were 5,936 people and 2,311 households residing in the neighborhood. The population density was 6,178/mi^{2}. The racial makeup of the neighborhood was 65% White, 17% African American, 1% Native American, 5% Asian, 8% from other races, and 4% from two or more races. Hispanic or Latino of any race were 48% of the population.

There were 2,311 households, out of which 31% had children under the age of 18 living with them, 24% were married couples living together, 33% had a female householder with no husband present, and 10% were non-families. 28% of all households were made up of individuals.

In the neighborhood the population was spread out, with 25% under the age of 18, 26% from 18 to 34, 23% from 35 to 49, 18% from 50 to 64, and 9% who were 65 years of age or older. For every 100 females, there were 93.7 males.

The per capita income for the neighborhood was $13,963. About 21% of the population were below the poverty line.

== Education ==
The schools that serve this area are as following:

- Forest Hills Elementary
- Twin Lakes Elementary
- Adams Middle School
- Chamberlain High School

== See also ==
- Neighborhoods in Tampa, Florida
