= Cesar Gonzmart =

American restauranteur (born 1920)

Cesar Casimiro Gonzmart
- Born: Cesar Casimiro Gonzales y Martinez; 6 March 1920; Tampa, Florida, US
- Died: 9 December 1992 (aged 72); Tampa, Florida, US
- Education: University of Havana (D.M.)
- Occupations: concert violinist, restaurateur, community leader
- Years active: 1952–1992
- Known for: Columbia Restaurant
- Spouse: Adelia Hernandez
- Children: 2, including Richard Gonzmart

César Gonzmart (March 6, 1920 – December 9, 1992) was a concert violinist and entertainer, Spanish "nobleman" and energetic chairman of the $42 million Columbia Restaurant Group (1991).

== Early years ==
Gonzmart was born César Gonzalez Martinez in Tampa, Florida, and named by his mother for the Roman general and statesman, Julius Caesar. (César is the Spanish spelling of Caesar.) At the age of three, he accompanied his mother, aunt, and grandmother on a cruise to Cuba. Having been impressed by shipboard violinist, he started lessons at age six. A successful student, musically and otherwise, he went to Stetson University on scholarship after only 2½ years at Hillsborough High School. In 1935 at age 15, César earned $20 a week substituting in the Columbia Restaurant's band; a job he held for three months before leaving for DeLand to attend college.

== Musical success ==
When César was 18, he was a symphonic violin soloist. He attended the University of Havana, earning a doctorate in music, and stood as the Havana Symphony Orchestra's concertmaster at age 21. He married and fathered a son, César Gonzalez, Jr., who would eventually join the United States Department of State as a career diplomat. That son had no connection to the family restaurant business.

After performing as a concert violinist in the United States and Cuba, César also found lucrative success performing popular music with his touring orchestra, César Gonzalez and his Magic Violins.

== Name change ==
At that point in his life, César Gonzalez changed his name to Gonzmart, drawn both from his father's surname of Gonzalez and his mother's of Martinez. He later explained that he had wanted to establish his own identity.

== Second marriage ==
César married Adela Hernandez, the granddaughter of Columbia founder Casimiro Hernandez Sr. in 1946. Adela, a Juilliard School of Music graduate, was an accomplished touring pianist. Notably, Adela had played at Carnegie Hall.

After the wedding, César and Adela Gonzmart toured together until César was convinced to work instead at the Columbia. Though it was a considerable financial loss, César complied to provide stability to the couple's son, Casey. The following year, their second son Richard was born. Although he traded his career as a musician for one as a restaurateur, after César Gonzmart became general manager, he regularly serenaded his guests with his violin and orchestra.

César learned the business quickly, and he and Adela began to have input in the decisions of the Columbia. In 1956, they convinced Adela's father, Casmiro, to build another large room, the Siboney dining room, named after a town in Cuba where American forces landed in the Spanish–American War (also the name of a song by a Cuban composer).

== Career ==
For the rest of his life, Gonzmart focused on managing and expanding the Spanish-themed Columbia group—opening high-volume dinner houses in Sarasota, St. Augustine, St. Petersburg and Clearwater Beach. Gonzmart also oversaw the launch of tropical-themed Cha-Cha Coconuts, a casual-themed bar & restaurant in 1988, now open in Sarasota's St. Armands Circle. In addition, the Columbia group operates a commissary called Columbia Food Service Inc. The year Gonzmart left the music business, the Columbia grossed $1 million. In 1991, just before his death, the chain earned $42 million. Gonzmart never stopped being the entertainer. Until illness prevented it, he wore a tuxedo as he walked the dining room, performing regularly at the Ybor City Restaurant.

== Honors ==
- 1971 Knighted by the King of Spain as a Knight of Sant’Yago, the patron saint of Spain
- 1972 Gonzmart founded the Krewe of the Knights of Sant’Yago in Tampa.
- 1974 served as second king of the Knights of Sant’Yago
- 1989 Outstanding Restaurateur, Holiday magazine
- 1990 inducted into the Nation's Restaurant News Fine Dining Hall of Fame
- 1991 Tony Pizzo Award for Preservation of Tampa's Latin Heritage from the Ybor City Museum Society
- 1992 Hispanic Man of the Year from Tampa Hispanic Heritage
- 1993 State of Florida Resolution citing his lifetime accomplishments to the community and as a Florida businessman
- 1993 inducted into Tampa Bay Business Hall of Fame
- 1995 Lifetime Achievement Award from the Florida Restaurant Association.
- 2000 Designated a Great Floridian by the Florida Department of State in the Great Floridians 2000 Program
- 2005 Stetson University Distinguished Alumni Award
