= Florida Aquarium =

Aquarium in Tampa, Florida, United States

The Florida Aquarium
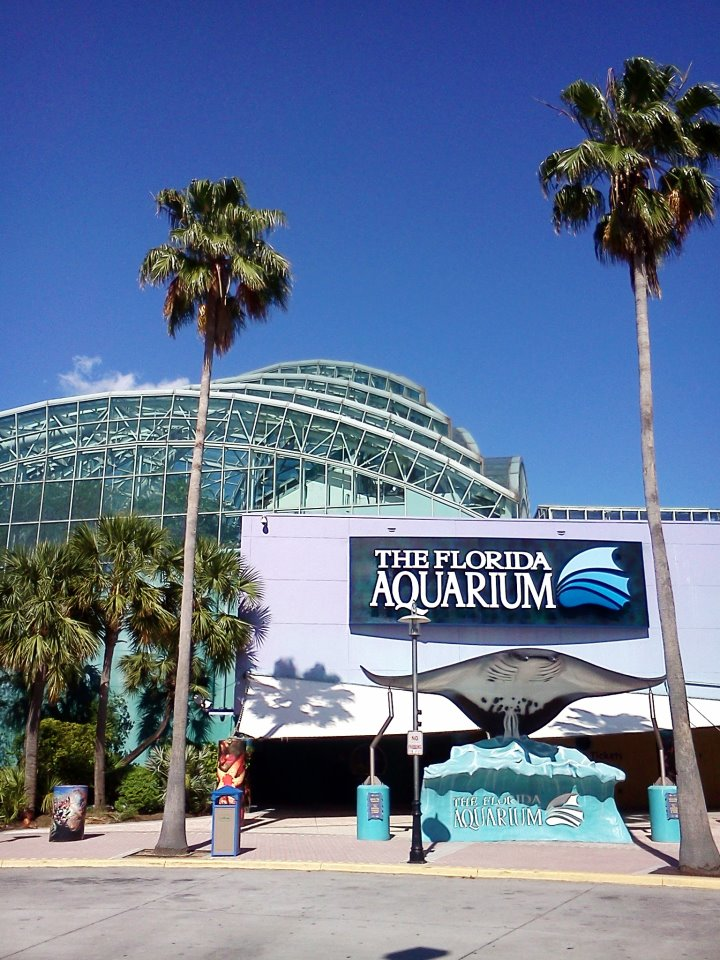
- Exterior of the Florida Aquarium
- Interactive map of The Florida Aquarium
- 27°56′39″N 82°26′42″W
- Date opened: March 31, 1995
- Location: Tampa, Florida, United States
- Floor space: 250,000 sq ft (23,000 m^{2})
- Volume of largest tank: 500,000 US gallons (1,900,000 L; 420,000 imp gal)
- Annual visitors: 1+ million
- Memberships: AZA
- Website: www.flaquarium.org

The Florida Aquarium is a 501(c)(3) non-profit organization, publicly operated institution located in downtown Tampa, Florida, United States. It is a large scale, 250,000-square-foot (23,000 m^{2}) aquarium and is accredited by the Association of Zoos and Aquariums. This means they are a leader in conservation and education, supporting programs for wildlife and having a strong educational component in the forms of summer camps, school trips, etc. The facility is home to more than 7,000 aquatic plants and animals from Florida and all over the world. The facility is located in the Channel District of Downtown Tampa. The Florida Aquarium opened in March 1995 as a privately funded entity and became a public-private partnership when the city of Tampa assumed responsibility for its debt in 1999. On April 18, 2012, the AIA's Florida Chapter placed the Florida Aquarium on its list of Florida Architecture: 100 Years. 100 Places.

On May 8, 2017, it was announced that the aquarium hired Roger Germann as its new president and CEO. Germann came from the John G. Shedd Aquarium in Chicago, where he was executive vice president for 16 years, and also served on the advisory board of the EPA Great Lakes National Program Office.

== History ==
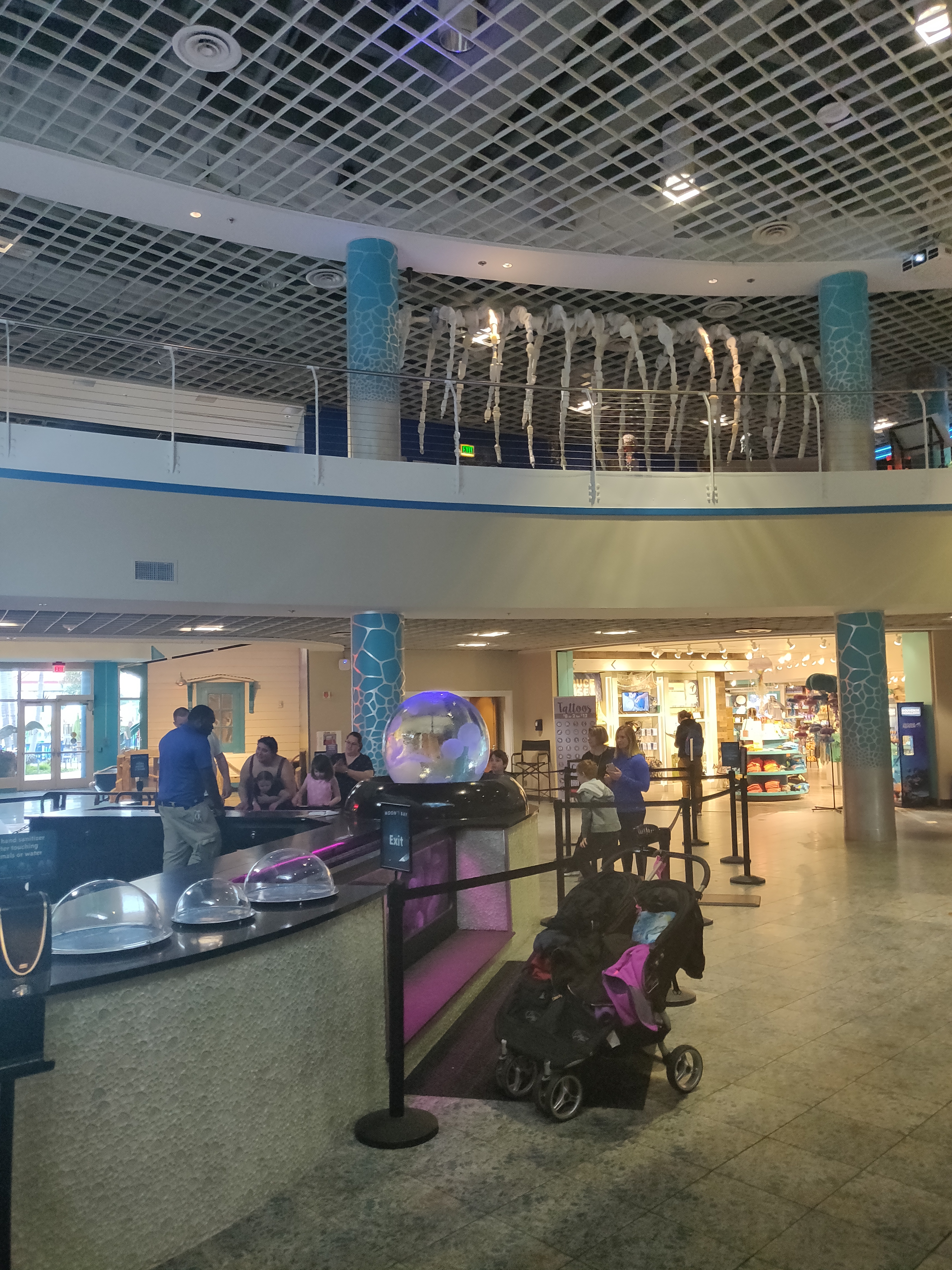
Inside the entrance.

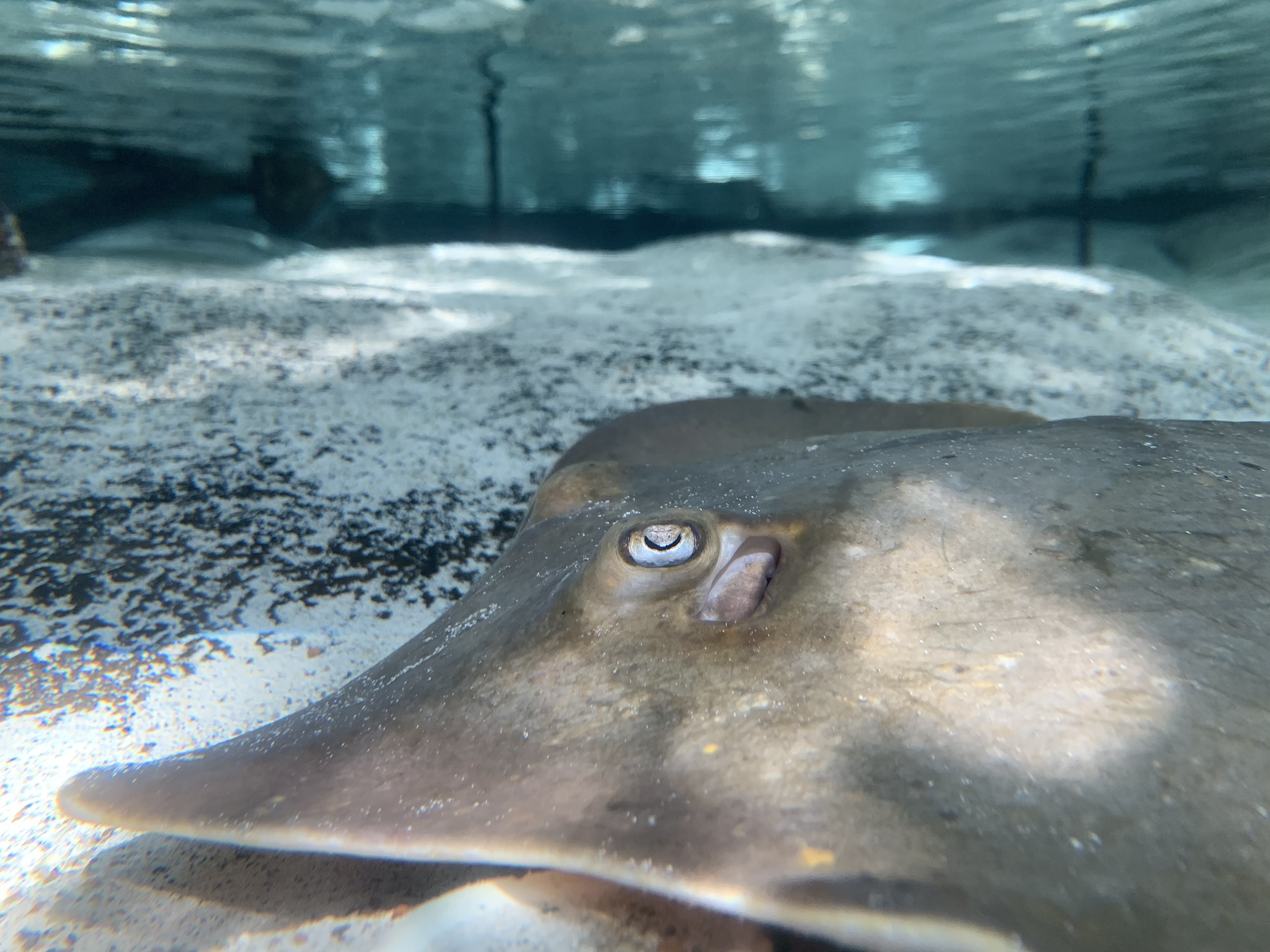
Atlantic stingray (Hypanus sabinus) resting in the Mangrove Tunnel exhibit.

Before the Florida Aquarium was constructed in Channelside of Downtown Tampa, it was formally known as the Clearwater Marine Science Center located on Clearwater Beach. It wasn’t until 1992 that the Tampa City Council accepted the Florida Aquarium’s proposed plan to begin construction in its new downtown location. The Florida Aquarium was largely constructed using borrowed money amid inflated projections that high attendance and ticket sales would pay off the incurred debt. However, after the aquarium opened in March 1995, the number of visitors and tourists fell well below expectations.

The aquarium fell into financial debt. In response to the crisis, the city of Tampa took over The Florida Aquarium's mortgage and debt in 1999. Managers at the institution were forced to lay off or demote roughly one-third of the aquarium's total staff.

After this debt, The Florida Aquarium set entertainment as its primary goal, incorporating ways to communicate messages about the importance of Florida's natural resources. The aquarium has educational tours hosting 100,000 school children each year.

Jeff Swanagan became CEO of the Florida Aquarium in 1998 and is credited with turning around the troubled institution. Swanagan loosened the aquarium's previous emphasis on science and Florida wildlife. He introduced several new exhibits featuring flora and fauna from other regions of the world to attract new and returning visitors to the aquarium. New exhibitions overseen by Swanagan included the "Dragons Down Under", which features leafy sea dragons that are native to the waters off Australia; an albino alligator; and an exhibit featuring snakes and bats called "Frights of the Forest". A sting ray was even nicknamed "Roseanne Barb" by a marketing department in an attempt to attract attention to the aquarium.

Under Swanagan, The Florida Aquarium was able to return to financial stability. The aquarium was able to pay off approximately $3 million in debt by 2002. He was also able to slash the annual subsidy provided to the aquarium from the city of Tampa from $1.1 million to $700,000. The number of visitors to the Florida Aquarium also rose during Swanagan's tenure as CEO. Total yearly attendance rose from 545,000 visitors to a record high of 620,000 in 2002. Jeff Swanagan departed The Florida Aquarium in 2002 to become the first president of Georgia Aquarium.

Thom Stork became President and CEO following Swanagan's departure for Georgia and continued the financial successes of his predecessor. In 2005, under Stork, The Florida Aquarium added Explore A Shore, a 2-acre outdoor, water adventure play area for children adjacent to the Caribbean Cantina. Average time spent at the aquarium doubled and response to the new water adventure zone was excellent. In the fall of 2008, The Florida Aquarium took one of its four galleries, Sea Hunt, and transformed the subdued gallery into the vibrant and interactive, Ocean Commotion gallery. Ocean Commotion brought high technology into an Aquarium for the first time, using "smart wi-fi' that was location-aware to transmit additional content and information directly to a guest's smartphone.

In 2011, The Florida Aquarium added large sand tiger sharks to its signature exhibit, the Coral Reef, which holds 500,000 gallons of natural saltwater (delivered by barge 4 to 5 times a year) and moved their popular Dive with the Sharks program from Shark Bay to the Coral Reef with the new sand tiger sharks.

Following 11 consecutive years of financial stability and operating in the black, the aquarium plans expansions over several phases for the future. The expansion includes new, state-of-the-art classrooms, changing exhibit space, an off-site rehabilitation and research facility and an exciting event center for hosting conventions, seminars, weddings and other special events.

While The Florida Aquarium is best known as a world-class attraction in downtown Tampa, Florida, the aquarium is also an established education resource having had its 1-Millionth student in 2011 and a research and conservation facility with current projects on coral propagation, underwater archaeology and sea turtle rescue and rehabilitation.

A new 100,000-US-gallon (380,000 L) gallon exhibit named "Heart of the Sea" opened during the fall of 2018, introducing animals such as southern stingrays, Atlantic goliath groupers, tarpon, bonnethead sharks and Kemp's ridley sea turtles to the aquarium's collections. For the first time, the habitat featured television cameras in the water, so that visitors could see the sea life from unique perspectives.

== Exhibits ==
The Florida Aquarium's exhibits are laid out to show the journey of a drop of water from one of Florida's many fresh-water springs out to the open waters of the Gulf of Mexico. Exhibits include a large simulated wetlands exhibit located under a tall glass atrium, a simulated beach, and a coral reef community housed in a 500,000-US-gallon (1,900,000 L) tank. The newest section is Waves of Wonder and Heart of the Seas gallery, which replaced the OceanCommotion section, and there are many expansion projects to open in the upcoming years (2023 – 2025). The Morph'd changing exhibit opened in mid-2023 and features animals with amazing adaptations.

== Coral reef research ==
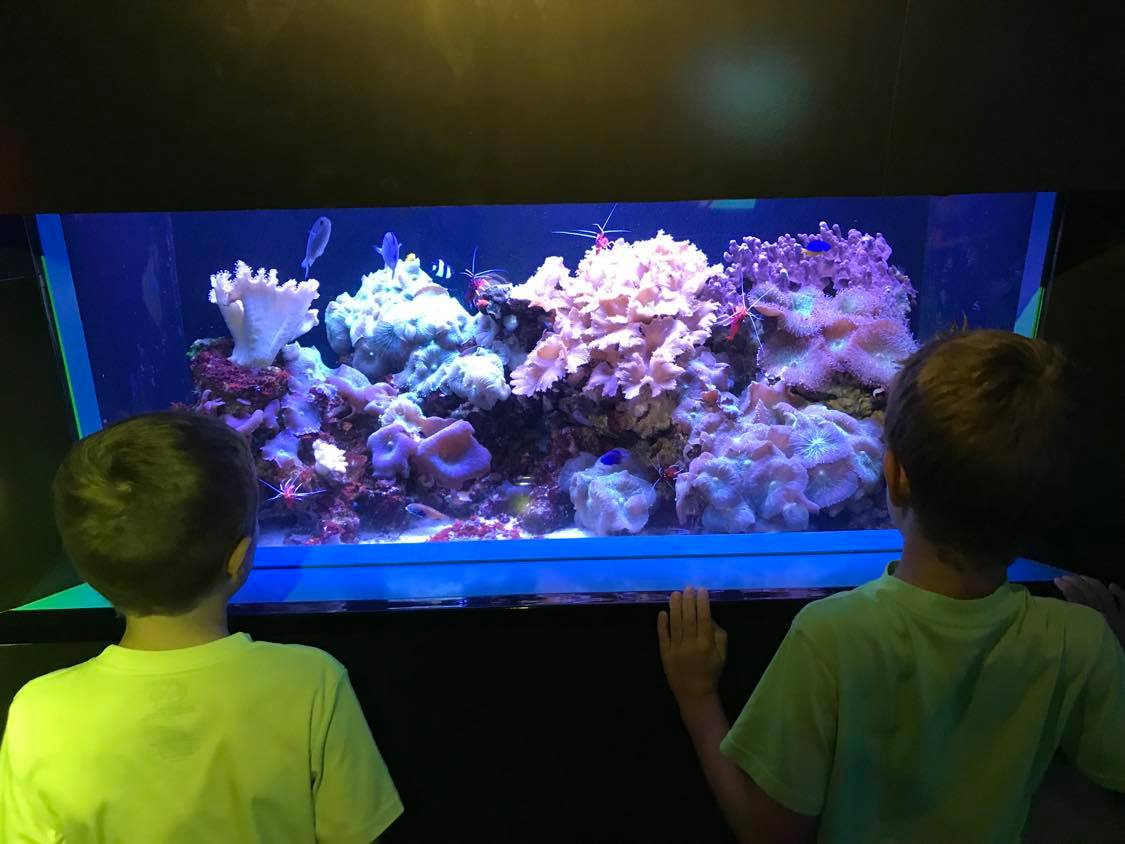
Coral research and conservation is a primary area of focus for the aquarium.

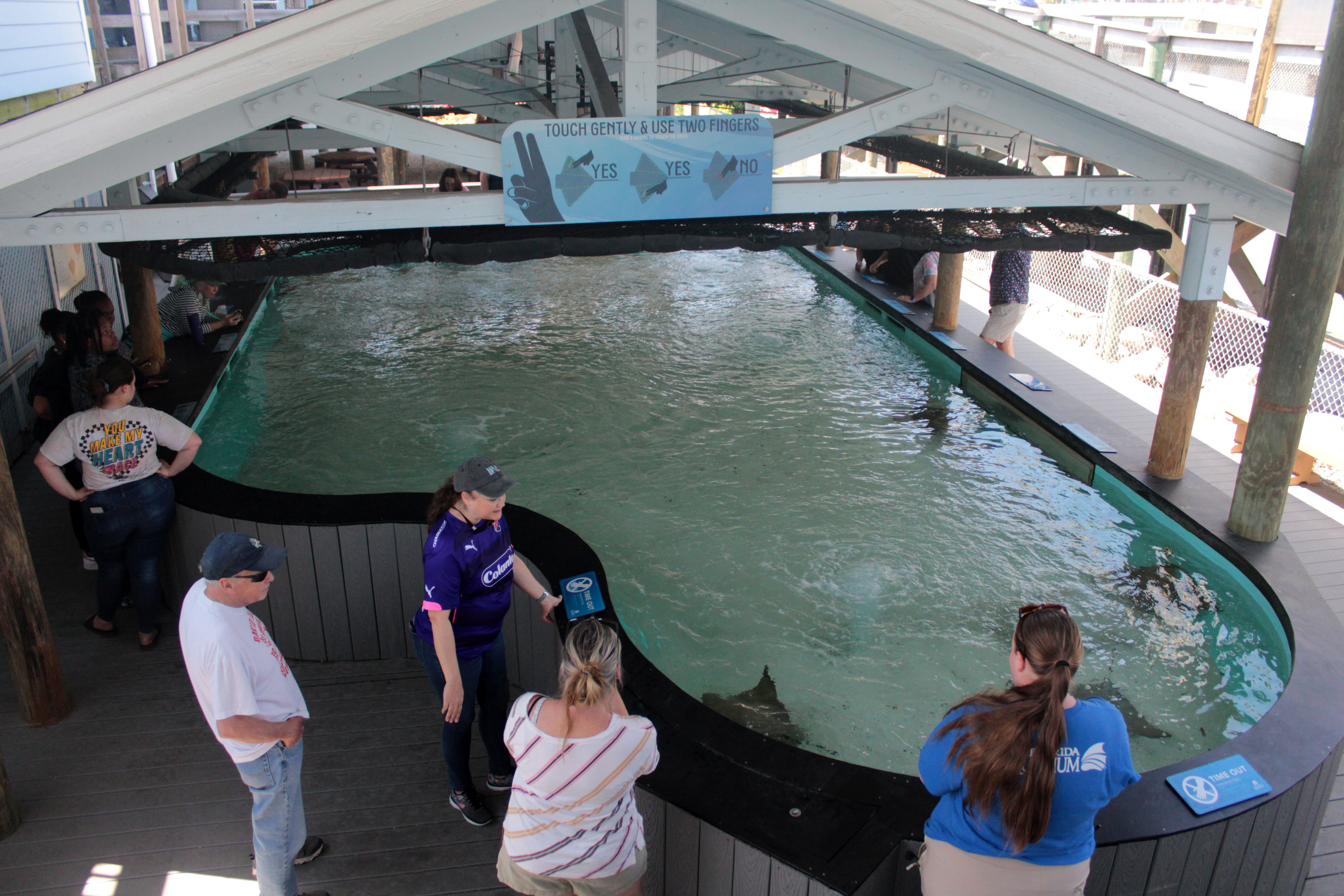
Cownose rays in a touch pool at the Apollo Beach campus.

Over the course of 250 years, the state of Florida has seen 50% of its coral disappear, due to pollution, climate change, human contact, bleaching, and now the idiopathic disease known as Stony Coral Tissue Loss Disease (SCTLD) that is killing the U.S.'s only inshore reef tract, spanning almost the entirety of it, and affecting 22 different species of stony corals to the point of suffering complete mortality.

To fight this loss, and attempt to save the coral – of extreme importance to the well-being of the state - the Florida Aquarium has joined a consortium led by the University of Miami, including Nova Southeastern University, coral conservation organization SECORE International, and the Phillip and Patricia Frost Museum of Science. The goal is to restore 125 acres of coral reef by planting 150,000 coral colonies, including five species of coral, by 2022.

In 2020, Florida Aquarium was the first to ever successfully reproduce Ridged Cactus Coral. Scientists are now taking care of the reproduced coral and discovering for the first time basic information on their biology. In 2022 Florida Aquarium scientists successfully reproduced elkhorn coral in the care of marine biologists.

=== Coral Conservation & Research Center ===
On March 22, 2024 the Florida Aquarium a unveiled a new 4,200-square-foot expansion of its Coral Conservation and Research Center at its Apollo Beach campus. The addition expands beyond the current capabilities of the aquarium's coral greenhouses and spawning labs, increasing to over 9,000 square feet specifically dedicated to the conservation, breeding, and nurturing of coral species at risk of extinction in their natural habitats. This includes the breeding of 14 unique coral species within the aquarium's coral center, species that are seldom maintained under human care.

== Education ==
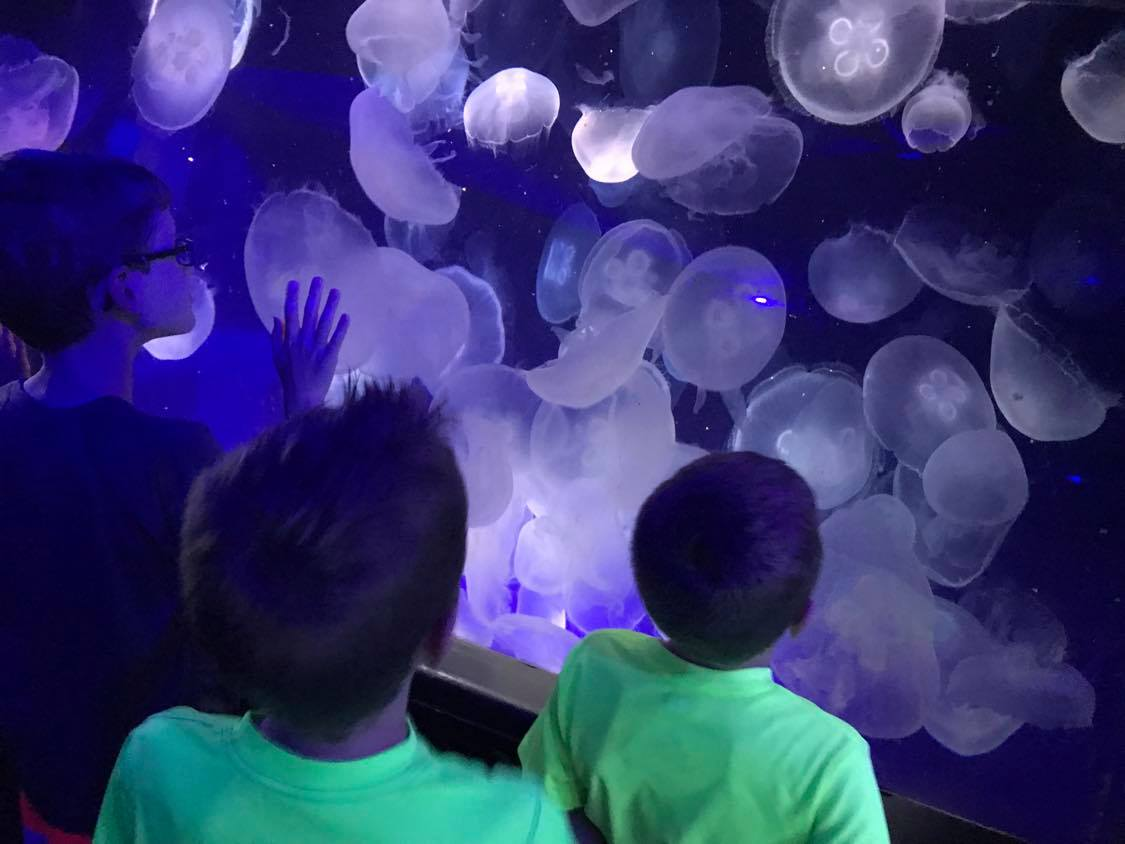
Around 90,000 school children are served each year through the many educational programs of the aquarium.

The mission statement of the Florida Aquarium is to "entertain, educate and inspire stewardship of the natural environment.". One way they accomplish this is through their educational programming. Several times a year adults can attend Evening Tide Talks, which are lectures given by renowned scientists, photographers, explorers, and researchers. Complimentary food, beer, and wine are provided for attendees.

=== Teachers and schools ===
The Aquarium offers field trips, traveling programs, and teacher workshops. Teachers are able to attend the aquarium for free in order to prepare for a field trip. The Aquarium also provides teaching materials that are designed to meet specific Sunshine State Standards/ FCAT Benchmarks. These materials were developed for grades Pre-K through 8 and consist of pre and post lessons, scavenger hunts, and lab programs.

=== Youth and families ===
Kids and families can enjoy birthday parties, sleepovers, Scout programs, homeschool programs, and Aquatots. Aquatots is a program built for children 3–5 years old that they attend with a parent or guardian. It is "designed to encourage interaction with parent and child through story time, craft making, activity center play and touring the aquarium".

=== Camps ===
The Aquarium offers both School Year Camps and Summer Camps. School Year Camps coincide with holidays that take place in Hillsborough County during the school year. Children grades K-5 can enjoy activities such as science experiments, aquarium hikes, crafts, and animal encounters. Summer Camps, referred to as Aqua Camps, are available for people ages 3–18. They are centered around animals and their natural environments and include plenty of animal encounters and hands-on learning.

=== Virtual offerings ===
New to the aquarium are its virtual education programs including Virtual School Year Programs, Virtual Scouts, Virtual Homeschool, Virtual AquaTots, and Virtual Discoveries in STEM. The school year programs are for students of all ages. The Virtual Scouts align with the Girl Scouts, Cub Scouts, and Scouts BSA programs. The Virtual Homeschool features classes available for homeschool students ages 6–14, and the AquaTots is a preschool program for kids ages 3–5.

== Gallery ==
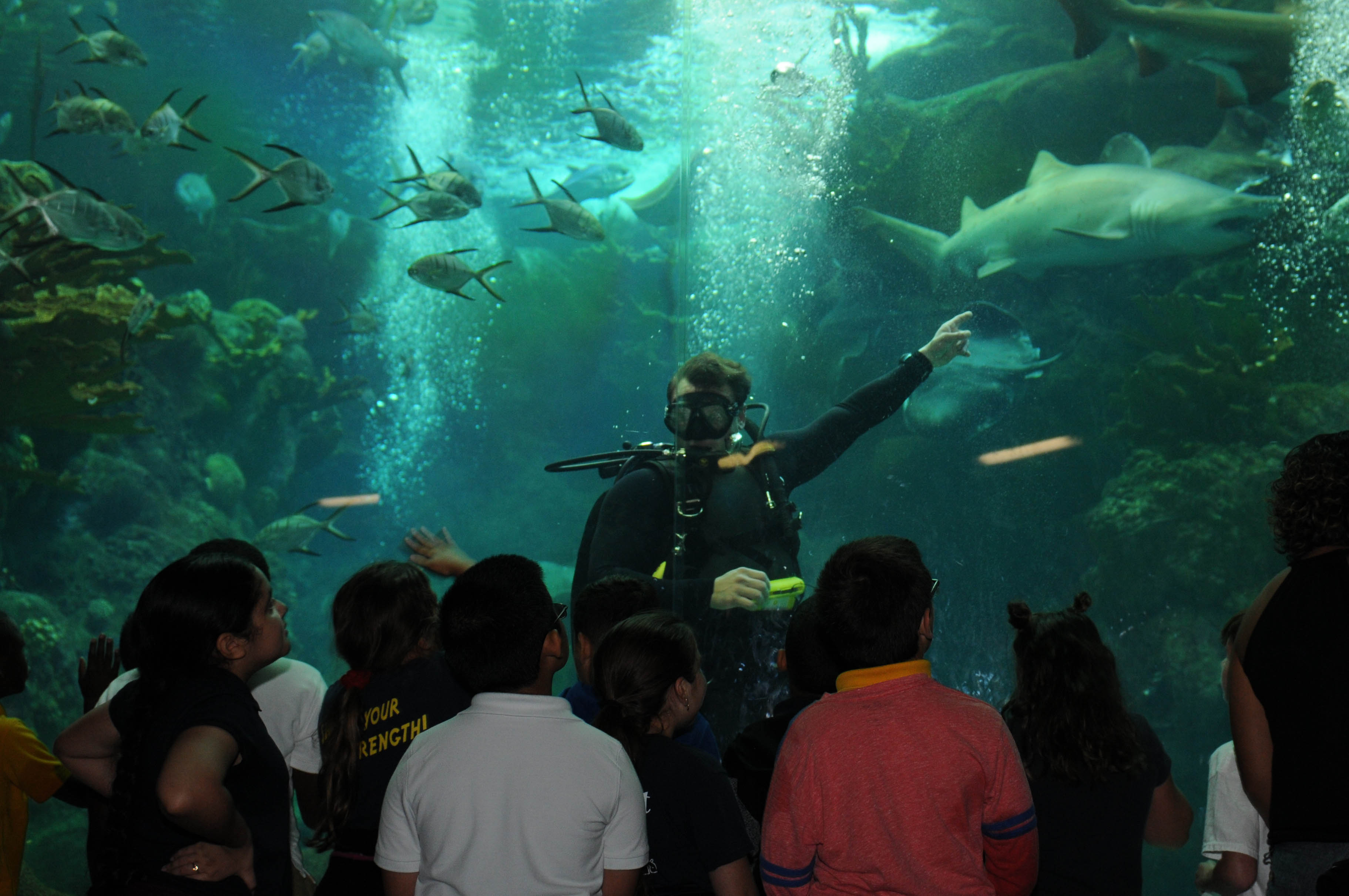
Diver highlighting ocean wildlife.

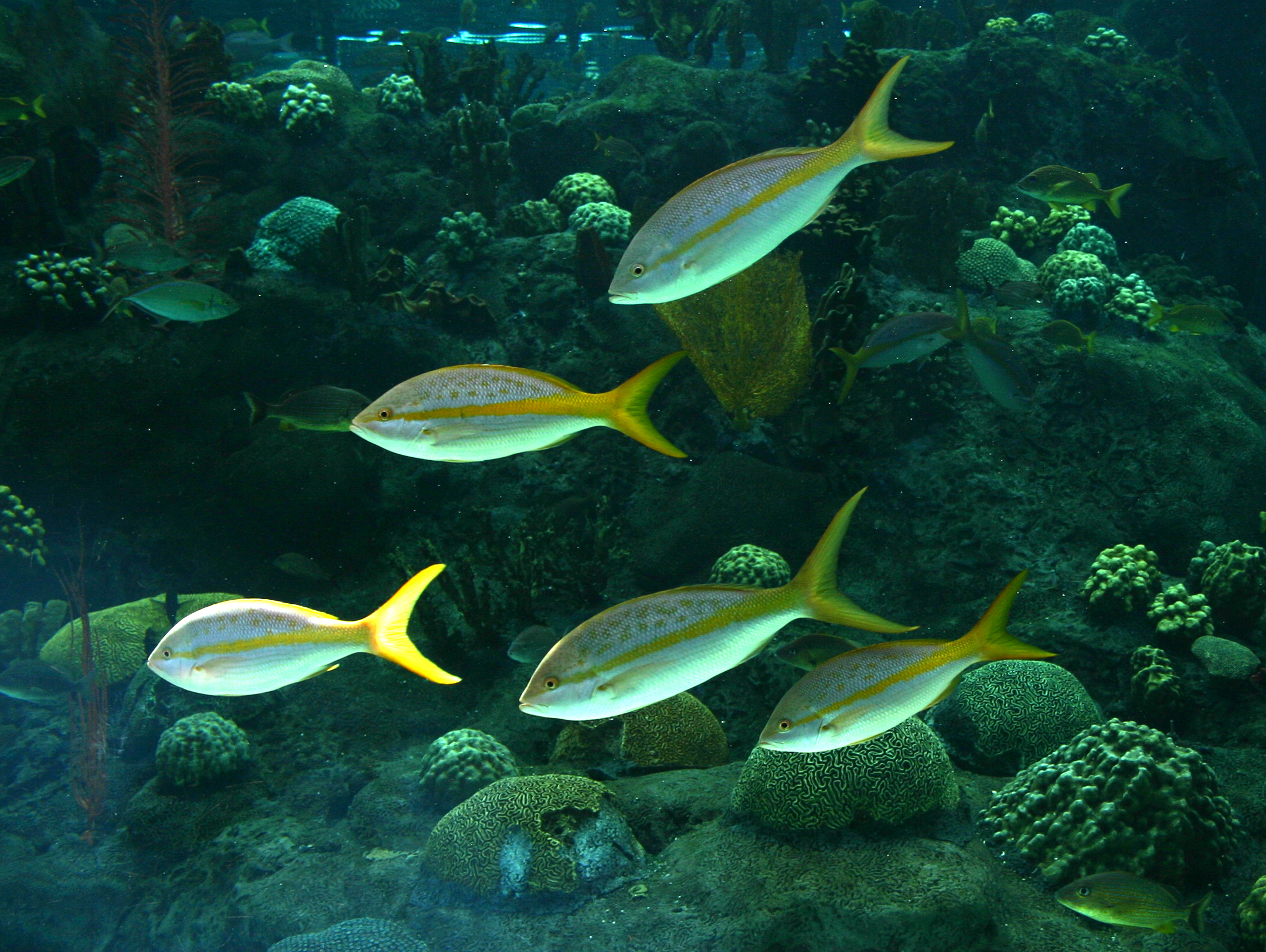
Yellowtail snapper (Ocyurus chrysurus).

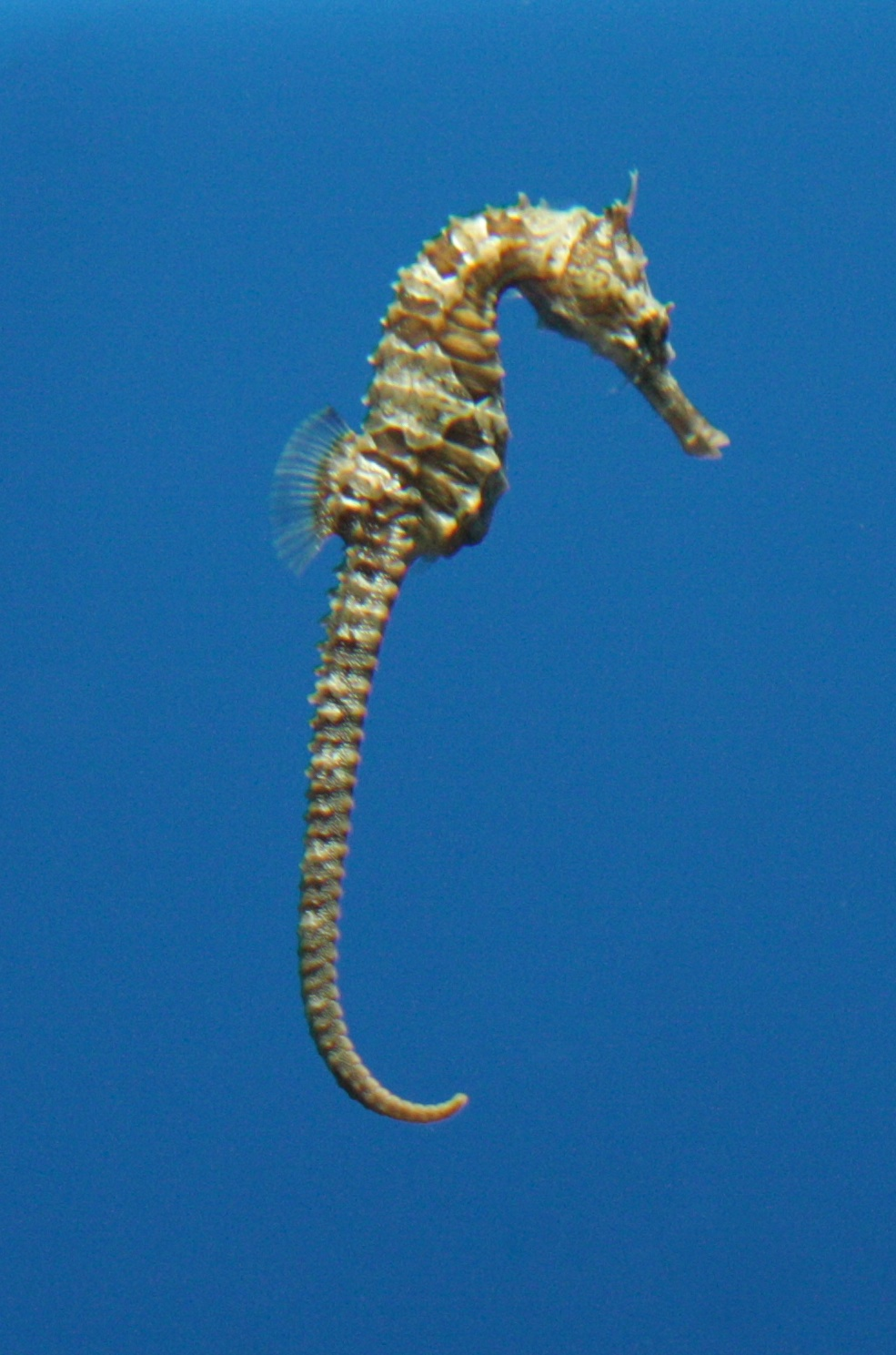
Lined seahorse (Hippocampus erectus).

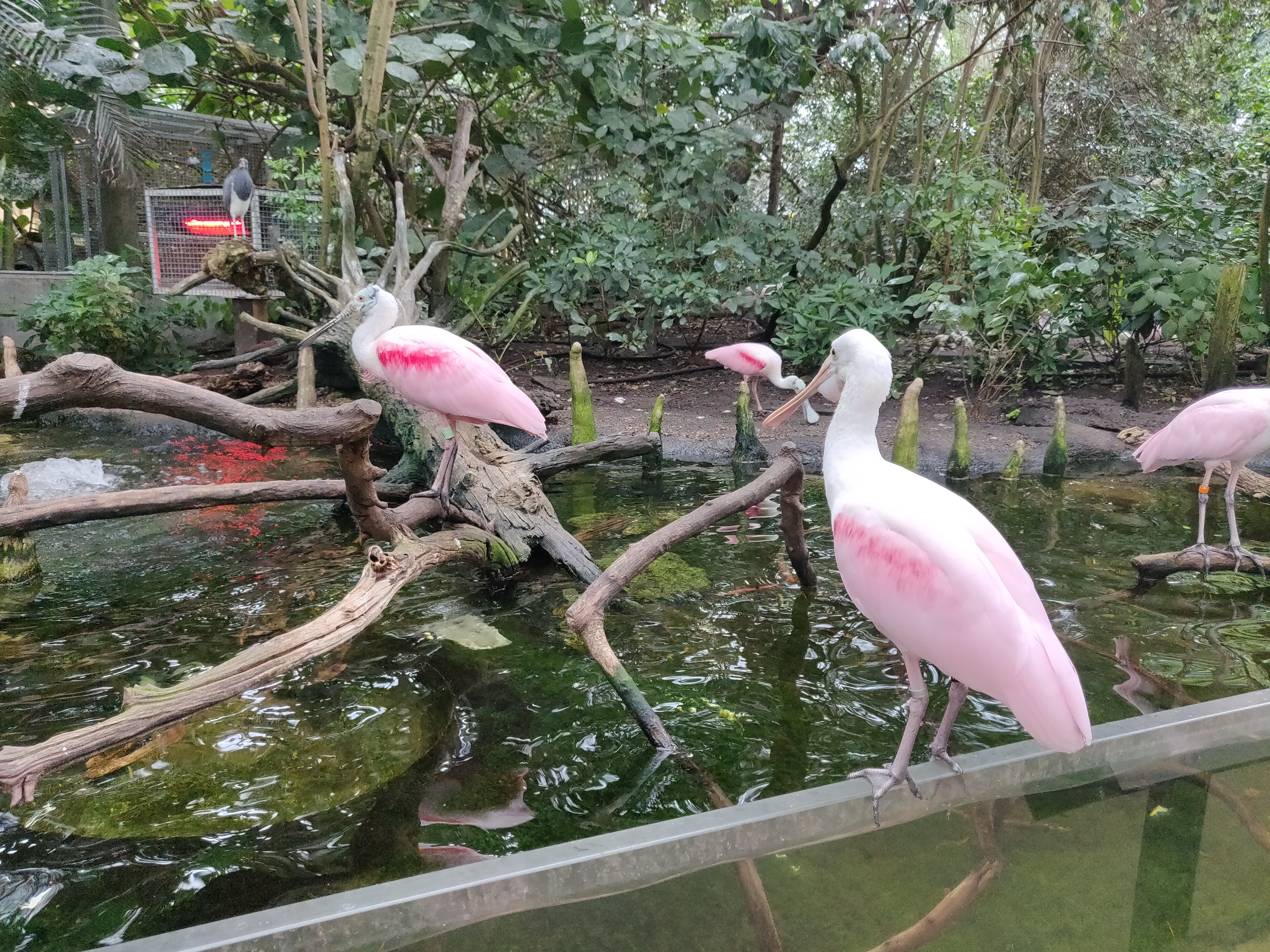
Birds in the atrium area.

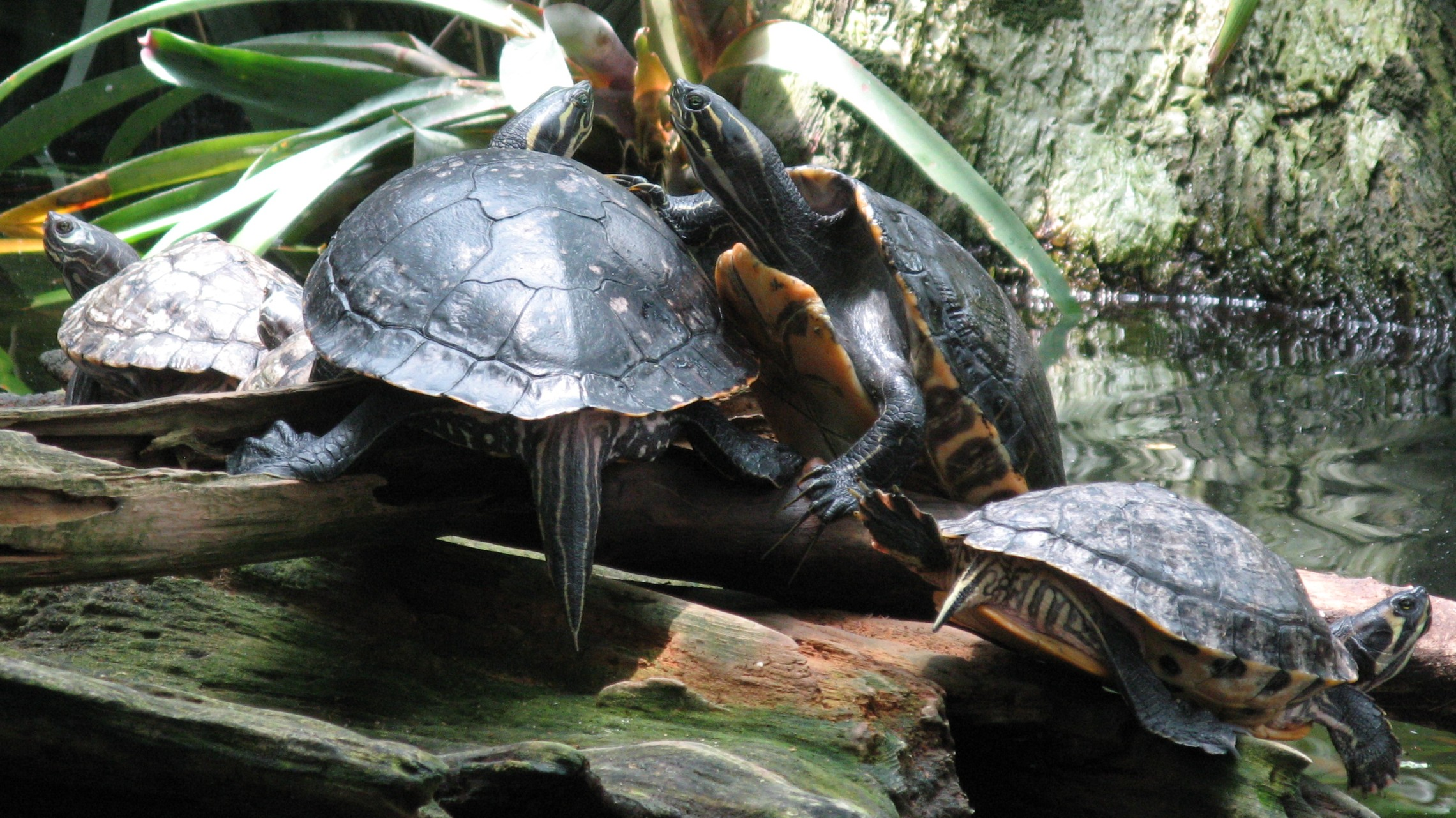
Painted turtles (Chrysemys picta).

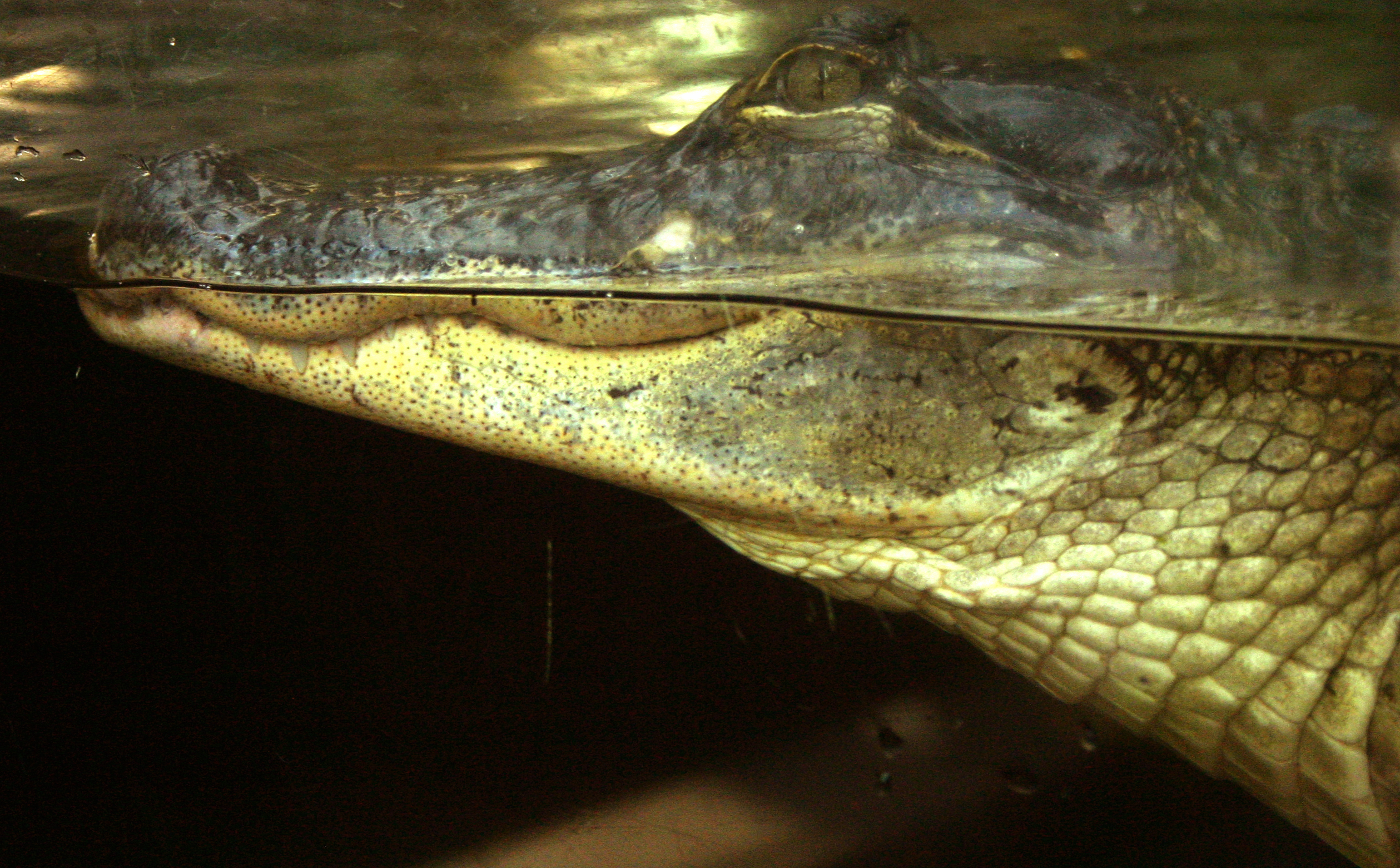
American alligator (Alligator mississippiensis).

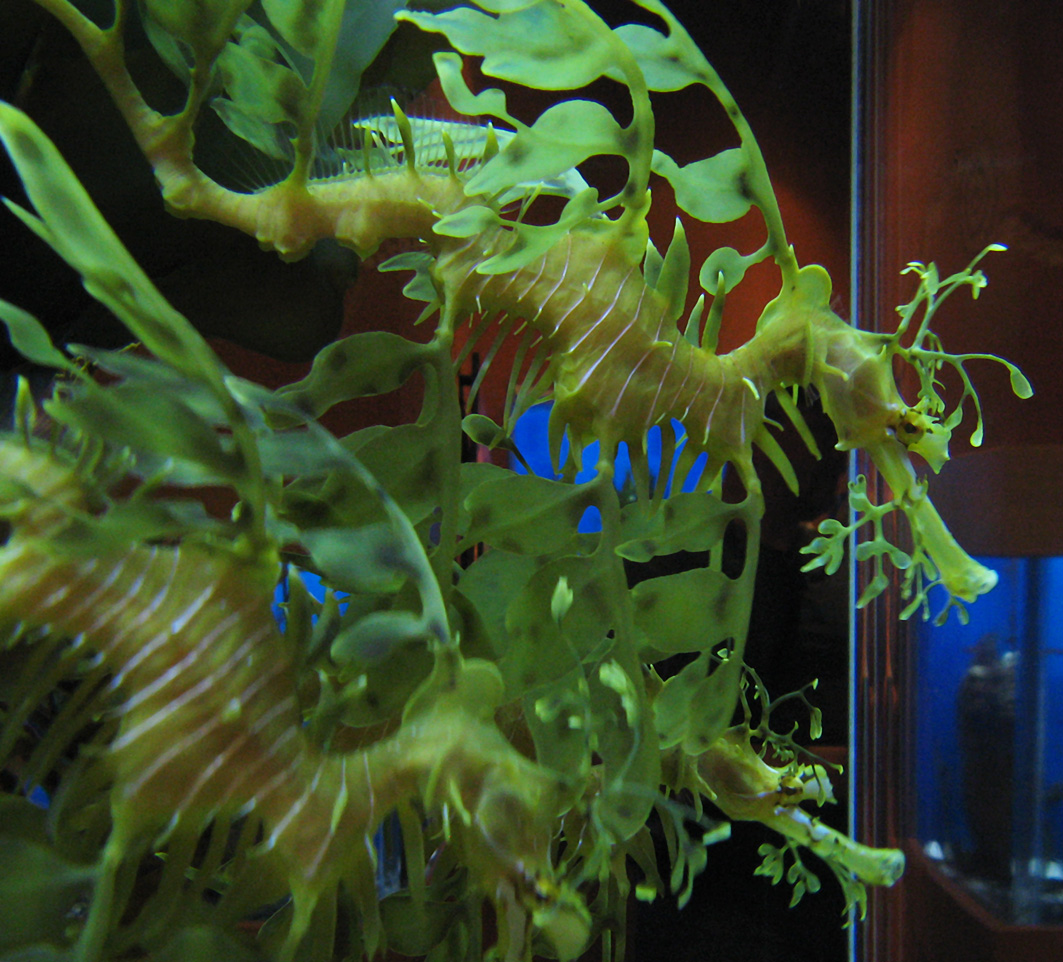
Leafy seadragon (Phycodurus eques).

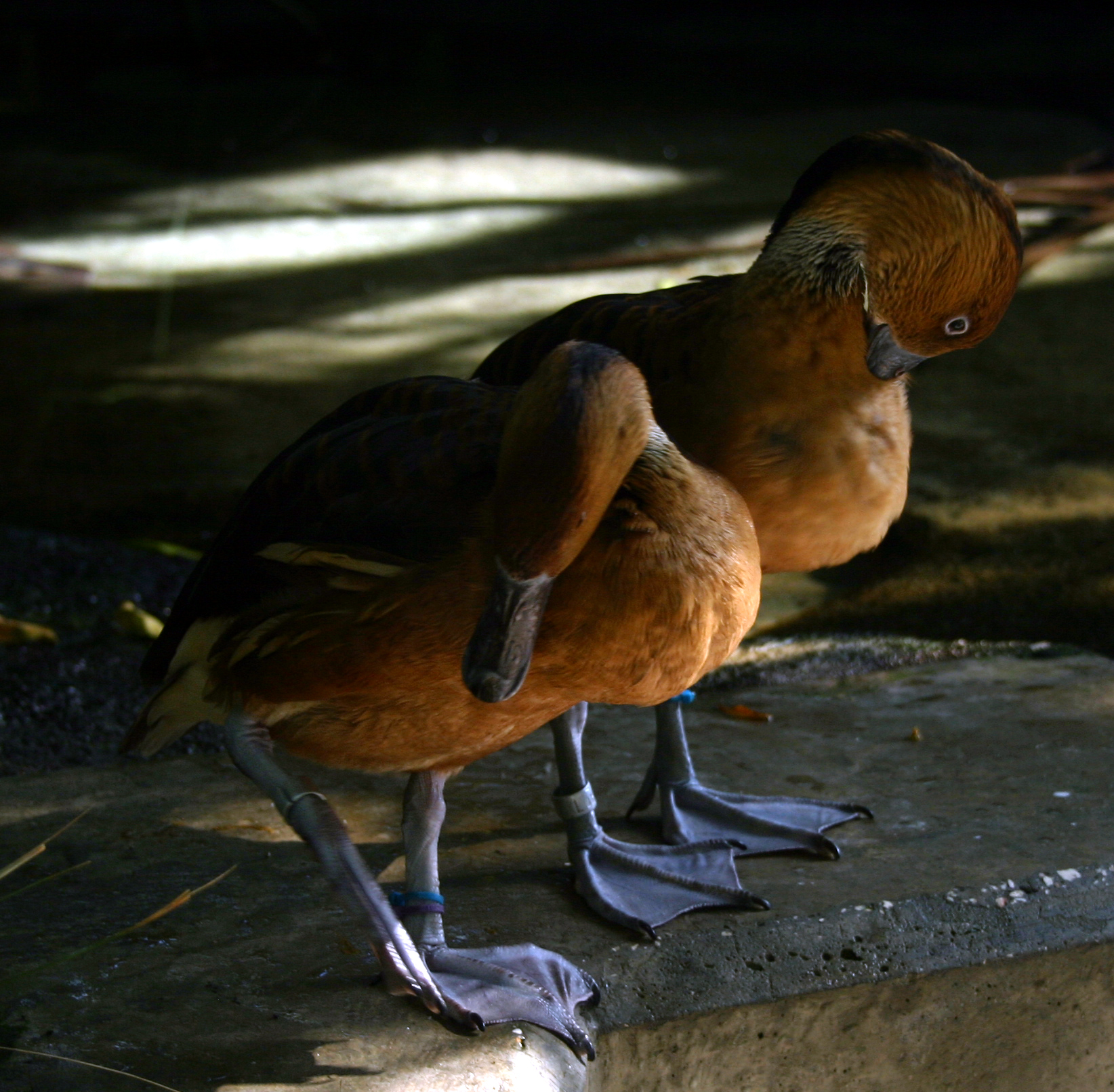
Fulvous whistling ducks (Dendrocygna bicolor).

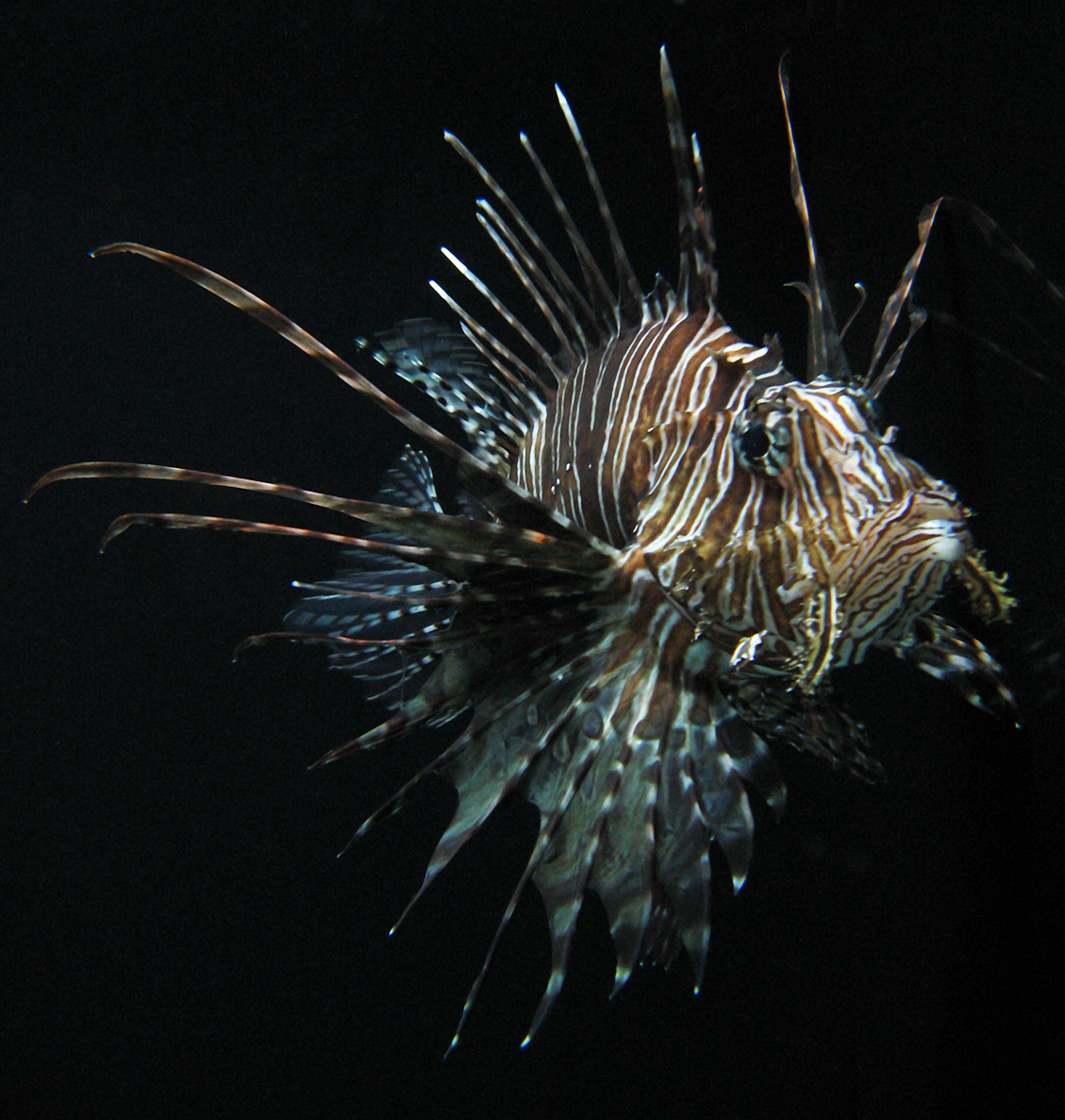
Lionfish

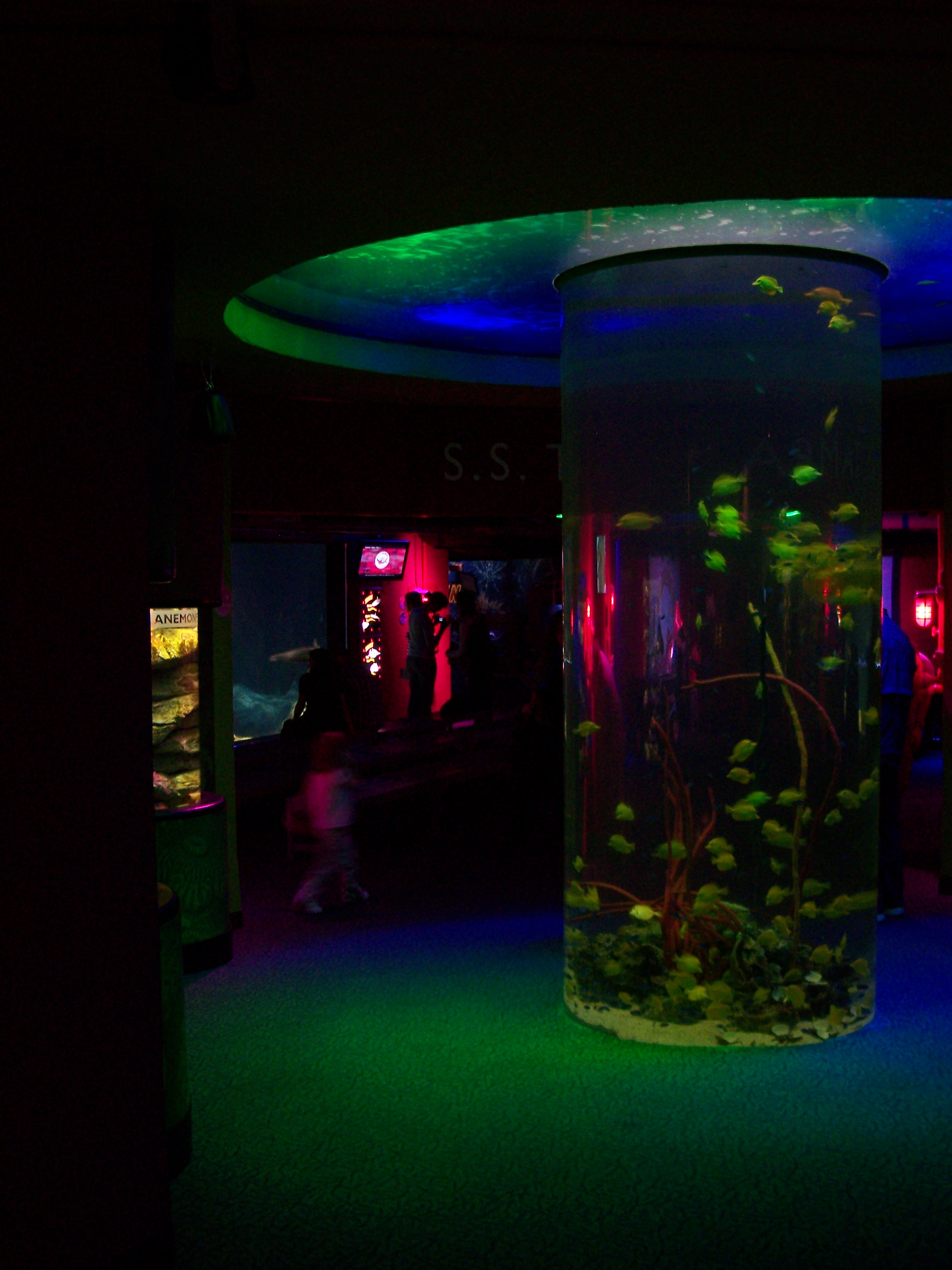
A cylindrical aquarium in one of the exhibits.
