= Jeff Swanagan =

American executive director

- Born: Jeffery Scott Swanagan; October 24, 1957; Footville, Ohio, U.S.
- Died: June 28, 2009 (aged 51); Powell, Ohio, U.S.
- Education: Ohio State University (BS); Georgia Institute of Technology (MS)
- Occupation: Executive director
- Employer(s): Florida Aquarium (1998–2002); Georgia Aquarium (2002–2008); Columbus Zoo and Aquarium (2008–2009)
- Spouse: Suzy Holley (m. 2005)
- Children: 5

Jeffery Scott Swanagan (October 24, 1957 - June 28, 2009) was an American director of several major aquariums and zoos in the United States, including the Florida Aquarium, Zoo Atlanta, the Georgia Aquarium, and the Columbus Zoo and Aquarium. He was the founding executive director and president of the Georgia Aquarium and is credited with much of the aquarium's creation and design.

== Early life and education ==
Swanagan and his family moved from Footville, Ohio, to Geneva-on-the-Lake, Ohio, in the early 1970s. He attended Geneva High School during his junior and senior year and graduated from the school in 1976 lettering in football. Swanagan was a foreign exchange student in France during high school and was fluent in French.

Swanagan attended Ohio State University following graduation from high school. Later on, while working at Zoo Atlanta, Swanagan earned his master's degree from the Georgia Institute of Technology.

== Career ==
Swanagan began his career when he joined the Columbus Zoo as an intern in 1980. The zoo's director, Jack Hanna, met Swanagan in 1978 while he was working at a nearby hotel as an Ohio State University science education student. OSU professor Dr. Barbara Thomson assigned Swanagan to the Columbus Zoo & Aquarium for a semester letter grade. Hanna hired Swanagan as a zookeeper two years later. In 1982, Hanna promoted Swanagan to the position of education director, a job that he held until 1987.

Swanagan worked as the deputy director of Zoo Atlanta from 1992 until 1998.

=== Florida Aquarium ===
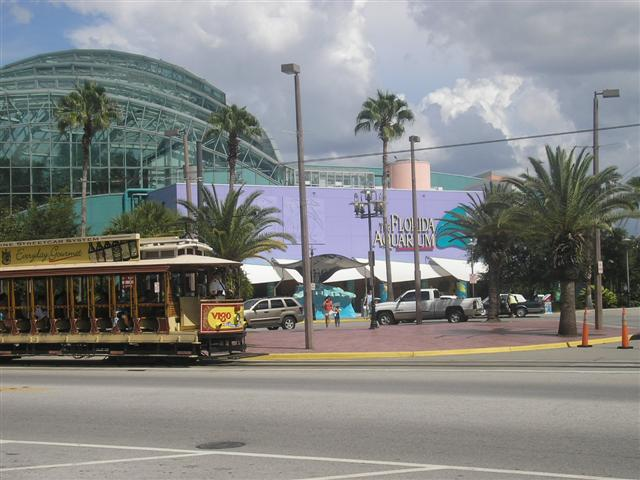
Florida Aquarium in Tampa

Swanagan departed Zoo Atlanta to serve as the CEO of the Florida Aquarium in Tampa from 1998 to 2002. He was credited with rescuing the Florida Aquarium from heavy financial debt and poor attendance.

The Florida Aquarium was constructed with borrowed money amid exaggerated attendance projections, according to the St. Petersburg Times. However, once the aquarium opened, attendance numbers were much lower than expected. Visitors often found the Florida Aquarium's heavy emphasis on Florida wildlife and science to be boring.

The city of Tampa took over the ownership of the mortgage of the heavily indebted aquarium. Aquarium managers demoted or laid off more than one-third of the aquarium's staff in response to the financial crisis.

Swanagan reacted to the crisis by introducing new exhibits of animal life from outside Florida. These exhibits included leafy sea dragons, snakes, bats, and an albino alligator, as well as a sting ray, which marketers named Rosanne Barb. Under Swanagan, the Florida Aquarium paid off approximately $3 million in debt by 2002. Swanagan also cut the aquarium's annual subsidy from the city of Tampa from $1.1 million to $700,000. Additionally, attendance rose from 545,000 visits per year to a then-record high of 620,000 visits in 2002.

=== Georgia Aquarium ===
A whale shark at the Georgia Aquarium.

In 2002, Bernie Marcus, a philanthropist and founder of Home Depot, requested a meeting with the Florida Aquarium's Swanagan. Swanagan had hoped for a financial donation to the Florida Aquarium. Instead, Marcus offered Swanagan a job as head of a new aquarium he was planning, which would become the future Georgia Aquarium.

Marcus, the founder of the Georgia Aquarium, hired Swanagan as the aquarium's first employee in 2002. Marcus had donated approximately $250 million for the establishment of the Georgia Aquarium. The remaining $40 million came from corporations such as Coca-Cola, Home Depot, Georgia-Pacific, AirTran, Southern Companies, SunTrust Bank and AT&T.

Swanagan became the Atlanta institution's founding executive director and president. Swanagan helped to guide the Georgia Aquarium to its inception in 2002. He worked with the aquarium's biologists to design and stock the aquarium, which would open to the public in 2005. He was charged with everything from the design of the building to the logistical nightmare of importing whale sharks, the largest fish in the world, from Taiwan to Atlanta, Georgia with the assistance of the UPS company.

In an example of his early work, in 2002 Swanagan and aquarium biologist Bruce Carlson observed the sunrise in the vacant lot that would become the Georgia Aquarium. The purpose of Swanagan's and Carlson's observation was to locate the spot for the future aquarium's coral reef tank. The coral reef exhibit, which would become the largest indoor reef in the United States, needed a large skylight to provide light to the sensitive coral, so locating the most light on the site was critical to Swanagan.

The Georgia Aquarium opened in 2005 with Swanagan as its first president and executive director. The aquarium eventually became the state's second most popular tourist attraction, revitalizing parts of downtown Atlanta in the process. Swanagan and the aquarium sustained criticism early in its history when its two original whale sharks died after receiving a chemical bath to eliminate gill parasites.

Swanagan left the Georgia Aquarium for the Columbus Zoo in 2008. Anthony Godfrey replaced him as the CEO and president of the aquarium. Swanagan had hired Godfrey in 2004 as the Georgia Aquarium's chief financial officer.

=== Columbus Zoo and Aquarium ===
Swanagan joined the Columbus Zoo and Aquarium as executive director in 2008 at the invitation of Jack Hanna, the director emeritus of the Columbus Zoo and a personal friend and mentor. He helped to develop several major attractions at the Columbus Zoo, including Jungle Jack's Landing and Zoombezi Bay exhibits.

== Personal life ==
Swanagan had five children. Shortly after the opening of the Georgia Aquarium in 2005, Swanagan married his second wife, marketing executive Suzy Holley.

=== Death ===
Jeffery Scott Swanagan died at his home in Powell, Ohio, on June 28, 2009, at the age of 51. He suffered a possible heart attack while napping on his sofa after an afternoon of gardening.

Bernie Marcus, founder of the Georgia Aquarium wrote, "He will always be remembered as a friend and a creator of the Georgia Aquarium."

Many of the zoo and aquarium world considered Swanagan a great leader and an extraordinary visionary whose mantra was "Touch the heart to teach the mind."
