= Georgia Aquarium =

Public aquarium in Atlanta, Georgia, United States

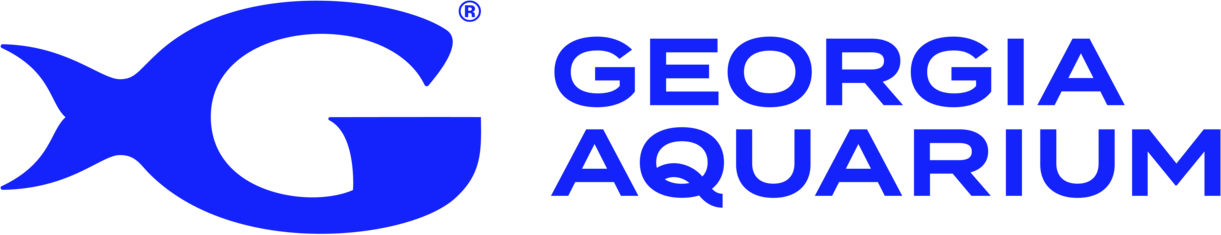

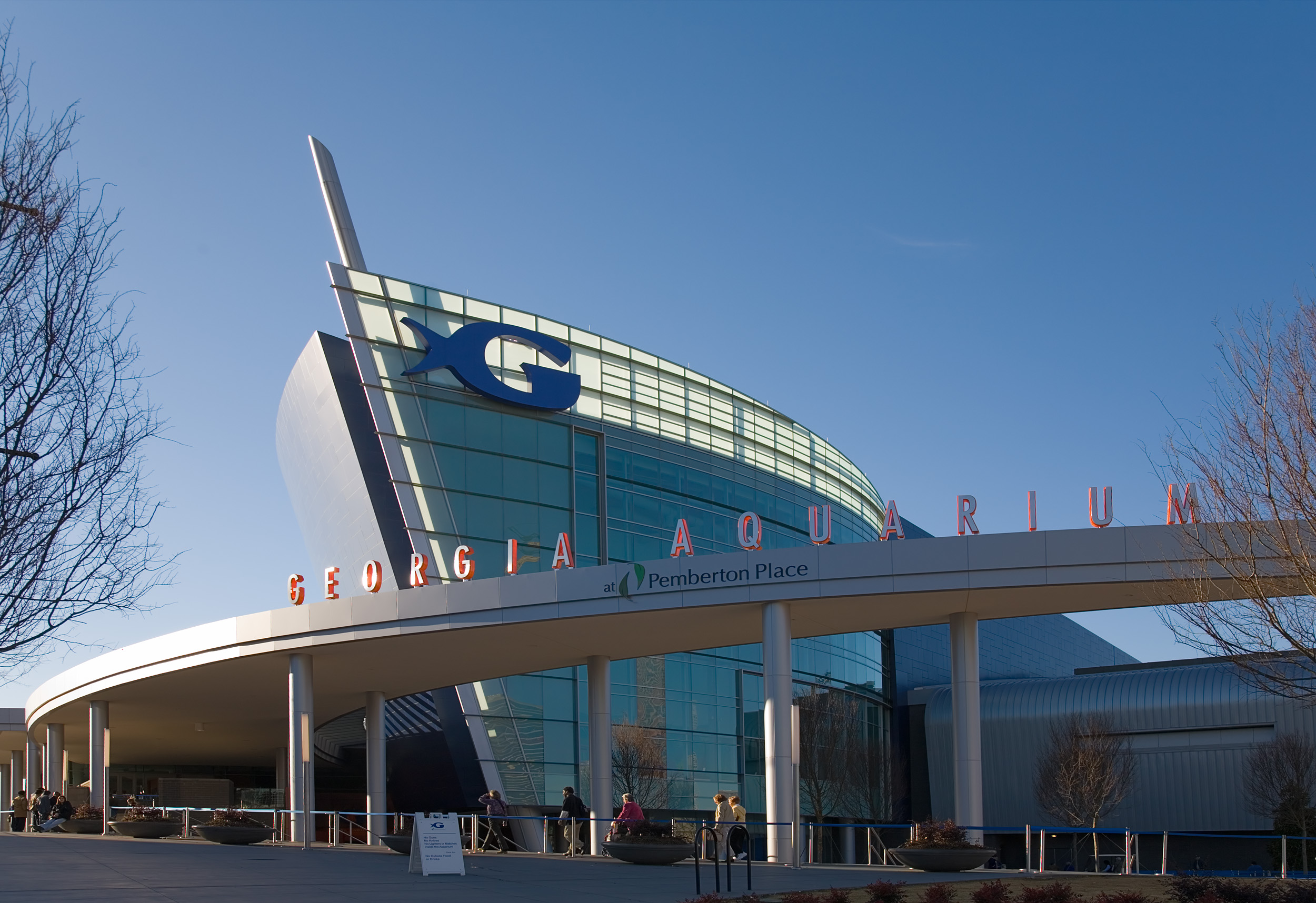
- The Georgia Aquarium in 2006
- Interactive map of Georgia Aquarium
- 33°45′46″N 84°23′41″W
- Date opened: November 23, 2005; 20 years ago
- Location: Atlanta, Georgia, U.S.
- Volume of largest tank: 6.3 million US gallons (24,000 m^{3})
- Total volume of tanks: More than 11 million US gallons (42,000 m^{3})
- Annual visitors: 2.9 million (2019)
- Memberships: Association of Zoos and Aquariums (AZA); Alliance of Marine Mammals Parks & Aquariums (AMMPA); International Marine Animal Trainer's Association (IMATA); Smithsonian Affiliations program; Humane Certified by American Humane
- Website: georgiaaquarium.org

Georgia Aquarium is a public aquarium in Atlanta, Georgia, United States. The aquarium exhibits hundreds of species and thousands of animals across its seven major galleries, all of which reside in more than 11 million US gallons (42,000 m^{3}) of water. It was the largest aquarium in the world from its opening in 2005 until 2012 when it was surpassed by the S.E.A. Aquarium in Singapore and the Chimelong Ocean Kingdom in China; the Georgia Aquarium remains the largest aquarium in the United States and the sixth largest in the world.

A $250 million donation from the foundation of local businessman and The Home Depot co-founder Bernard Marcus provided the bulk of the funding needed to build and stock the new facility.

The aquarium's notable specimens include whale sharks, beluga whales, California sea lions, bottlenose dolphins, manta rays, sea otters, and tiger sharks. Its centerpiece is a 6.3 million US gallons (24,000 m^{3}) whale shark exhibit.

== History ==
In November 2001, Bernard Marcus announced his vision of presenting Atlanta with an aquarium that would encourage both education and economic growth. After visiting 56 aquariums in 13 countries with his wife, Billi Marcus, he donated $250 million toward what was to become Georgia Aquarium. Corporate contributions totaling an additional $40 million allowed the aquarium to open debt-free.

Founding president and executive director of the aquarium, Jeff Swanagan, was brought in as the aquarium's first employee in 2002 and served until 2008. He is largely credited with the creation of the aquarium, from the design of the structure to the procurement of animals for the exhibits.

The aquarium is in Downtown Atlanta on land donated by The Coca-Cola Company, adjacent to Atlantic Station and just north of Centennial Olympic Park. It has a blue metal-and-glass exterior. The world's largest when it opened in November 2005, the aquarium originally encompassed 550,000 square feet (5.1 ha; 13 acres) of covered space, and its exhibits held 8 million US gallons (30,000,000 L) of fresh and saltwater. Subsequent additions to the collection and redesigns of some habitats have increased the total water held to 11 million US gallons (42,000,000 L). 20,000 pounds (9,100 kilograms) of frozen food for the animals on exhibit is kept hidden from visitors in a stainless steel commissary at −20 °F (−29 °C).

After 27 months of construction, the aquarium opened with 60 animal habitats. Though the non-profit aquarium's admission charges are among the highest in the United States, attendance has far exceeded expectations, with 1 million visitors in the first 100 days, 3 million by August 2006, 5 million by May 2007, and 10 million by June 2009. The Aquarium is part of the Smithsonian Affiliations program and the Association of Zoos and Aquariums.

In 2019, the show The Aquarium produced by Left/Right Productions premiered on Animal Planet, documenting animal care and conservation work at the Georgia Aquarium. The show spotlighted various aquarium residents including a whale shark named Yushan, a sea turtle named Tank, and a penguin named Charlie. After the show ended following a two-season, twenty-episode run, Discovery+ began streaming the series, and the Georgia Aquarium subsequently partnered with the service to produce more content about animal experiences and conservation.

== Collection ==
=== Whale sharks ===
Video of the whale shark tank which also includes many other species

The aquarium was designed around a 6.3 million US gallons (24,000 m^{3}) whale shark exhibit, making it the first institution outside of Asia that houses the giant species.

The whale sharks' importation from Taiwan (by air, truck, and boat) had never been attempted previously. They were taken from Taiwan's annual fishing kill quota, under which they would have been eaten had they not been purchased by the aquarium. The aquarium's most famous specimens were four young sharks named Ralph, Norton, Alice, and Trixie, after the primary characters from The Honeymooners. Ralph and Norton died in 2007.

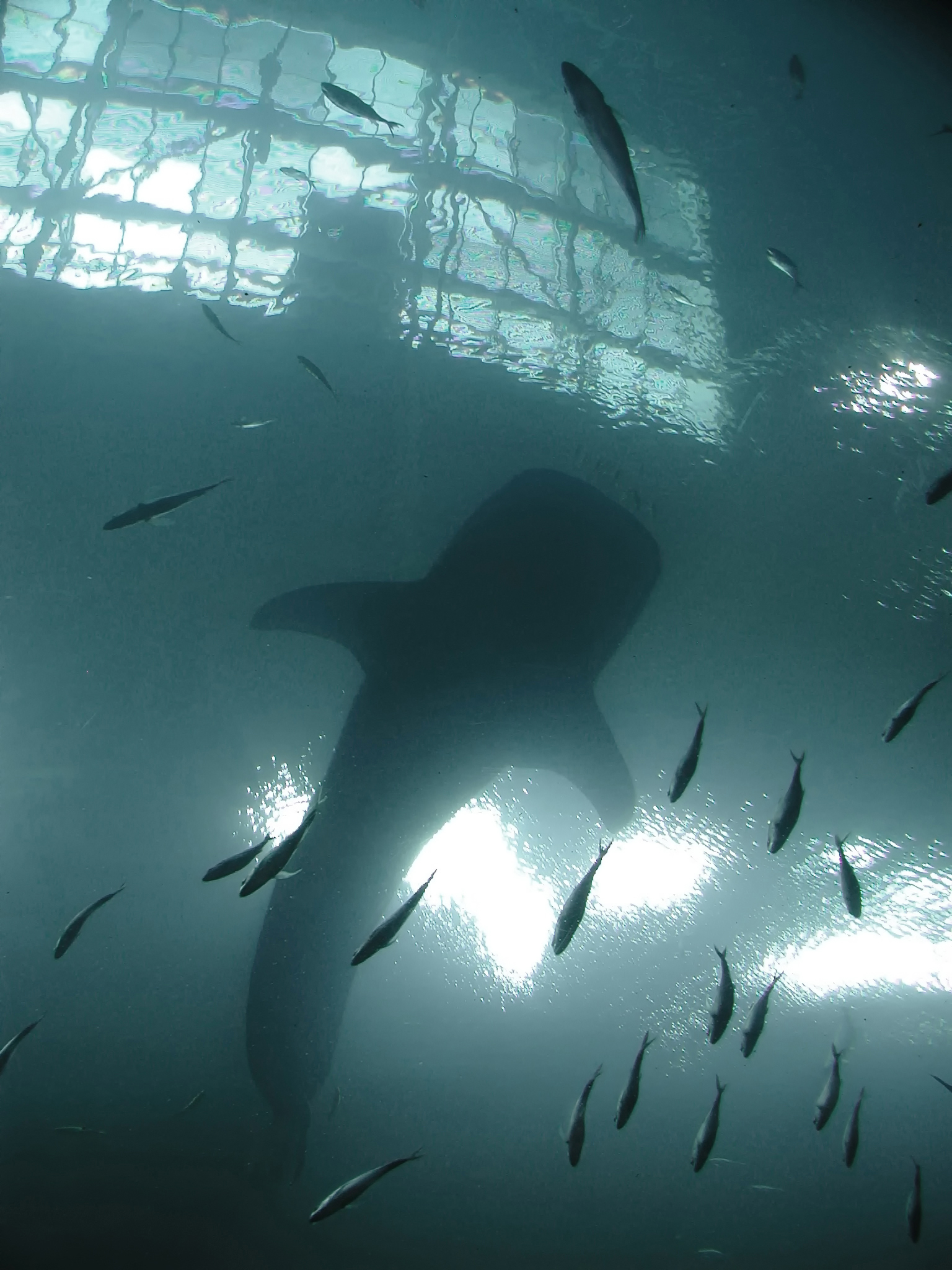
Whale shark silhouette

Also in 2007, the aquarium received two new sharks ("Taroko", commemorating Taroko Gorge National Park, and "Yushan" after Taiwan's Jade Mountain) just before a ban on capture of that species took effect. Trixie died after her health declined in 2020. Alice died in 2021. Taroko was euthanized in 2025 after medical staff noticed changes in his appetite and behavior.

=== Manta rays ===
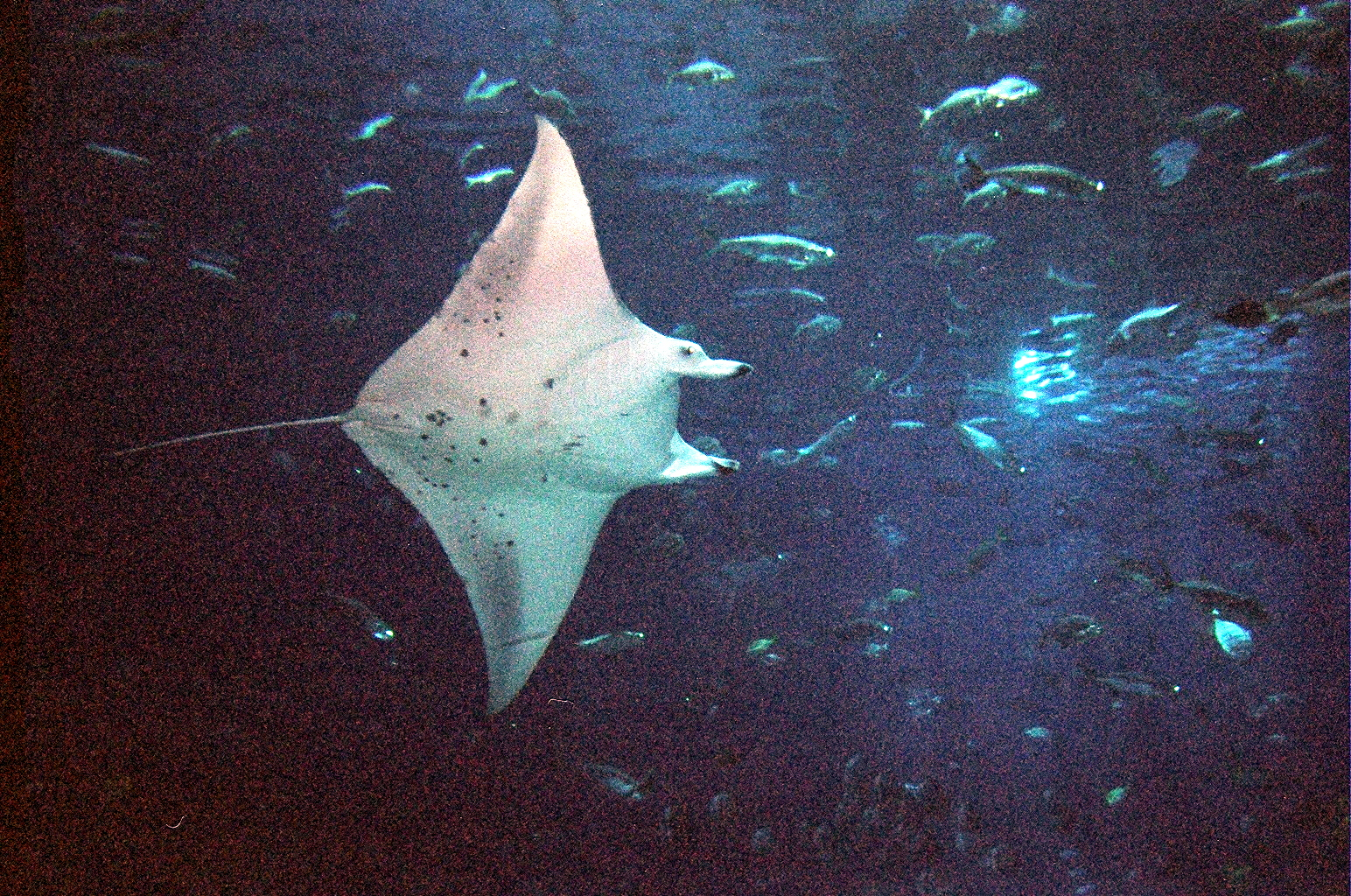
Nandi the manta ray

The aquarium is only one of four sites in the world displaying a manta ray. Nandi, the aquarium's first manta ray, and the first manta ray on display in the country, was accidentally caught in nets protecting the South African coast from sharks. She joined the Ocean Voyager exhibit in 2008. A second, Tallulah, was added in September 2009. A third, Raven, was added in 2010, with the aquarium's first male manta (later named Blue) added shortly thereafter. Raven subsequently died, leaving the facility with three mantas.

=== Beluga whales ===
The aquarium has been home to as many as six 11-foot (3.4 m) beluga whales at once.

Males Nico and Gasper, acquired from an amusement park in Mexico, were joined by three females on breeding loan from the New York Aquarium: Marina, Natasha and Natasha's daughter, Maris. After Gasper and Marina died in 2007, the belugas were transferred to SeaWorld San Antonio, where Nico died in 2009. In 2010, Maris and a new male, Beethoven, were returned to the Georgia Aquarium while Natasha remained with a potential mate in San Antonio. Two young belugas, Grayson (male) and Qinu (female), also from San Antonio, were added in November 2010. Before transferring to the Shedd Aquarium in 2014, Beethoven fathered calves with Maris in 2012 and 2015, neither of which survived. Maris died of a heart defect in 2015. In 2016, Grayson was sent to Shedd Aquarium while SeaWorld Orlando's Aurek and Maple and Shedd Aquarium's Nunavik arrived on loan at Georgia Aquarium. In June 2017, Georgia Aquarium announced that Qinu was pregnant with her first calf, sired by Aurek, and was due in the fall of 2017. In September 2017, Aurek was transferred to Shedd Aquarium on a breeding loan. On November 8, 2017, the Aquarium announced that Qinu's calf had died from complications during birth.

In 2012, the beluga whale Maris gave birth to a female calf. After less than a week, the calf, who was born underweight, died. Although mortality rates of calves born to first-time mothers are extremely high, even in wild populations, Maris's second calf—born on Mother's Day in 2015—would survive less than a month. Maris died in October of the same year, reigniting the debate as to whether the captive beluga breeding program was humane or successful.

On January 14, 2020, the Georgia Aquarium announced that 20-year-old Whisper was pregnant and due to deliver a calf in April. Whisper delivered the calf, Shila, on May 17 that year.

In 2026, the Georgia Aquarium became one of several aquariums participating in the relocation of the remaining belugas from the closed Marineland of Canada in Niagara Falls, Ontario. Two male belugas, 10-year-old Balor and seven-year-old Zephyr, arrived at the aquarium on August 13, 2026. They were among 30 belugas relocated from Marineland to aquariums in the United States and Spain.

Balor and Zephyr travelled by cargo aircraft to Hartsfield–Jackson Atlanta International Airport before being transported by truck to the aquarium, arriving at approximately 7 a.m. They were initially kept separately while they acclimated, but were introduced the following morning to the aquarium's four existing female belugas, Whisper, Maple, Qinu and Shila. Aquarium staff reported that the six whales were swimming and interacting together shortly after their introduction.

Following the transfers, the aquarium housed six belugas: Whisper, Maple, Qinu, Shila, Balor and Zephyr.

== Exhibits ==
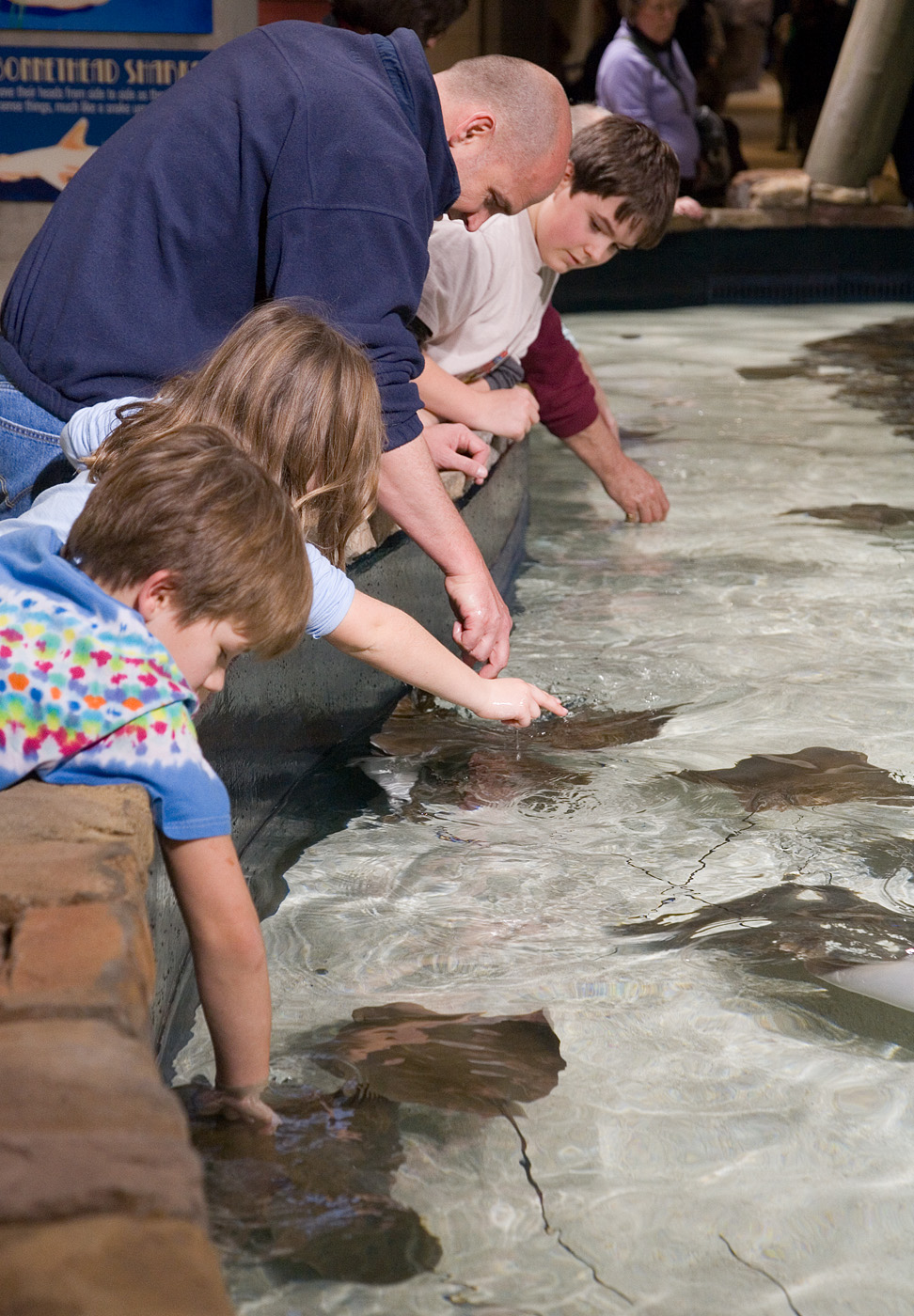
A touch pool at the aquarium

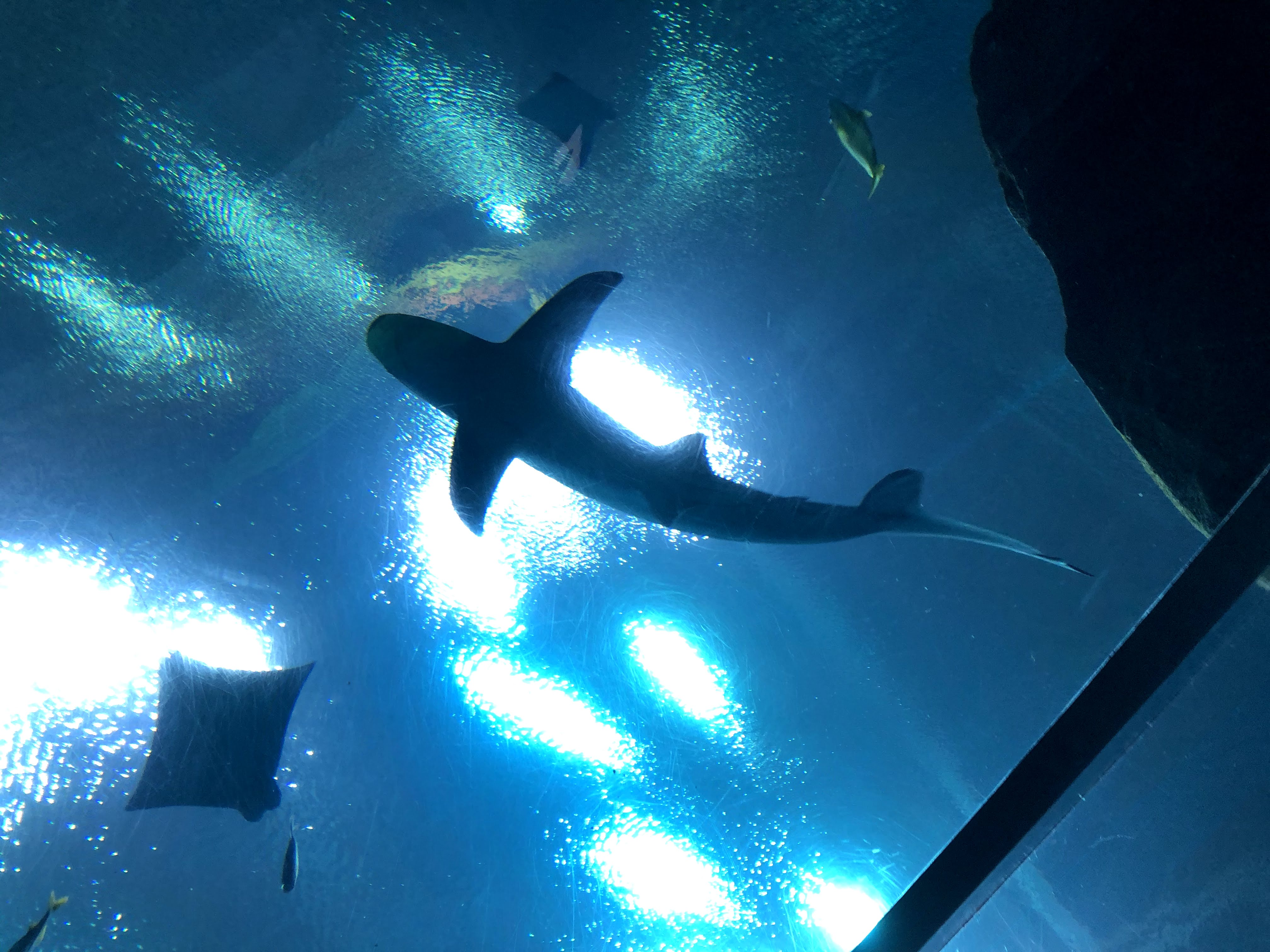
The underside of a Blacktip Reef Shark seen through the top of the tunnel

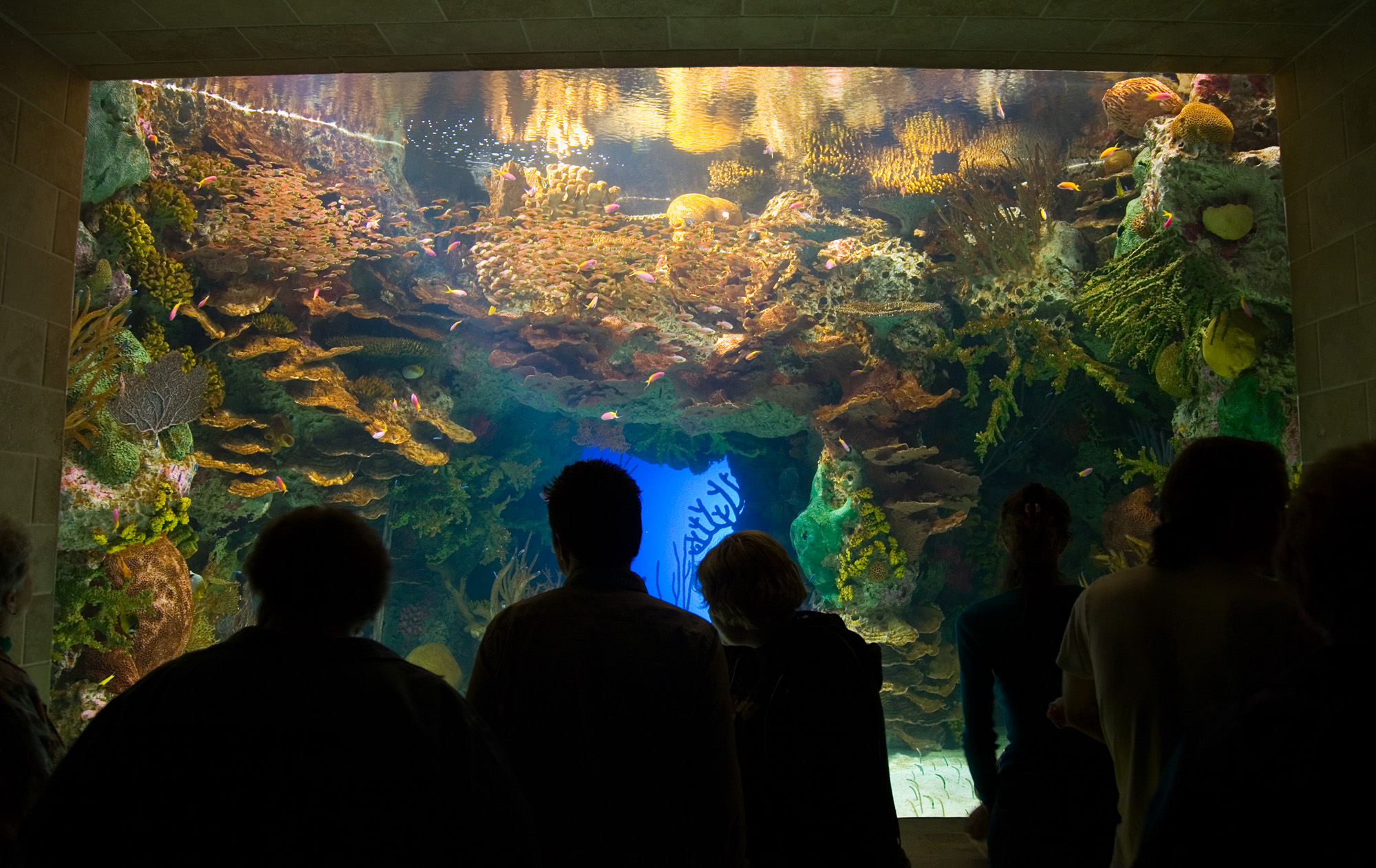
Tropical tank

The aquarium's animals are displayed in seven galleries and exhibits: Tropical Diver, Ocean Voyager, Explorers Cove, Cold Water Quest, Southern Company River Scout, Dolphin Coast, Truist Pier 225 and Aquanaut Adventure: A Discovery Zone. Each exhibit corresponds to a specific environment.

Cold Water Quest features animals from the polar and temperate regions of the world and contains most of the mammal species in the Aquarium's collection. This exhibit includes beluga whales and harbor seals in an 800,000-US-gallon (3,000,000 L) habitat, southern sea otters, Japanese spider crabs, weedy sea dragons, two types of puffins, and African penguins.

The largest exhibit, Ocean Voyager, built by the Home Depot, contains 6.3 million U.S. gallons (24,000,000 L) of water and several thousand fish. It measures 284 ft × 126 ft (87 m × 38 m) and the depth ranges between 20 and 30 ft (6.1 and 9.1 m), making it the largest indoor aquatic habitat in the world. This exhibit is designed to feature the life of the Mesoamerican Barrier Reef System and showcases the Aquarium's whale sharks and manta rays as well as a 100 ft (30 m) underwater acrylic tunnel and one of the world's largest viewing windows.

Truist Pier 225 holds California sea lions. Among its six animals, individuals named Jupiter and Neptune were rescued in the 2015 mass sea lion stranding in California. This exhibit also offers scheduled presentations about the species.

Dolphin Coast is home to the aquarium's pod of 13 common bottlenose dolphins in a 1.8 million U.S. gallons (6,800,000 L) exhibit. This exhibit also features shorebirds such as roseate spoonbills and scarlet ibis.

Aquanaut Adventure: A Discovery Zone contains several smaller exhibits and multiple hands-on activities, including an augmented reality scavenger hunt using the aquarium's mobile app.

Sharks! Predators of the Deep opened on October 23, 2020, and it has a new 20-foot-deep (6.1 m) tank that has housed great hammerhead sharks, sand tiger sharks, tiger sharks, silvertip sharks, silky sharks, zebra sharks, and round ribbontail rays. It features a dive cage, where visitors can be submersed in the tank. It has a wading pool where visitors can walk with rays and zebra sharks.

Explorers Cove opened in August 2024, and features touch pools with cownose rays and lake sturgeons.

== Research and conservation ==
According to founder Bernard Marcus, the aquarium's conservation and environmental mission are equal in importance to its role as an attraction. Before opening, the aquarium was already working with Georgia Tech and Georgia State University in Atlanta and the University of Georgia in Athens to help save endangered species through education and research programs.

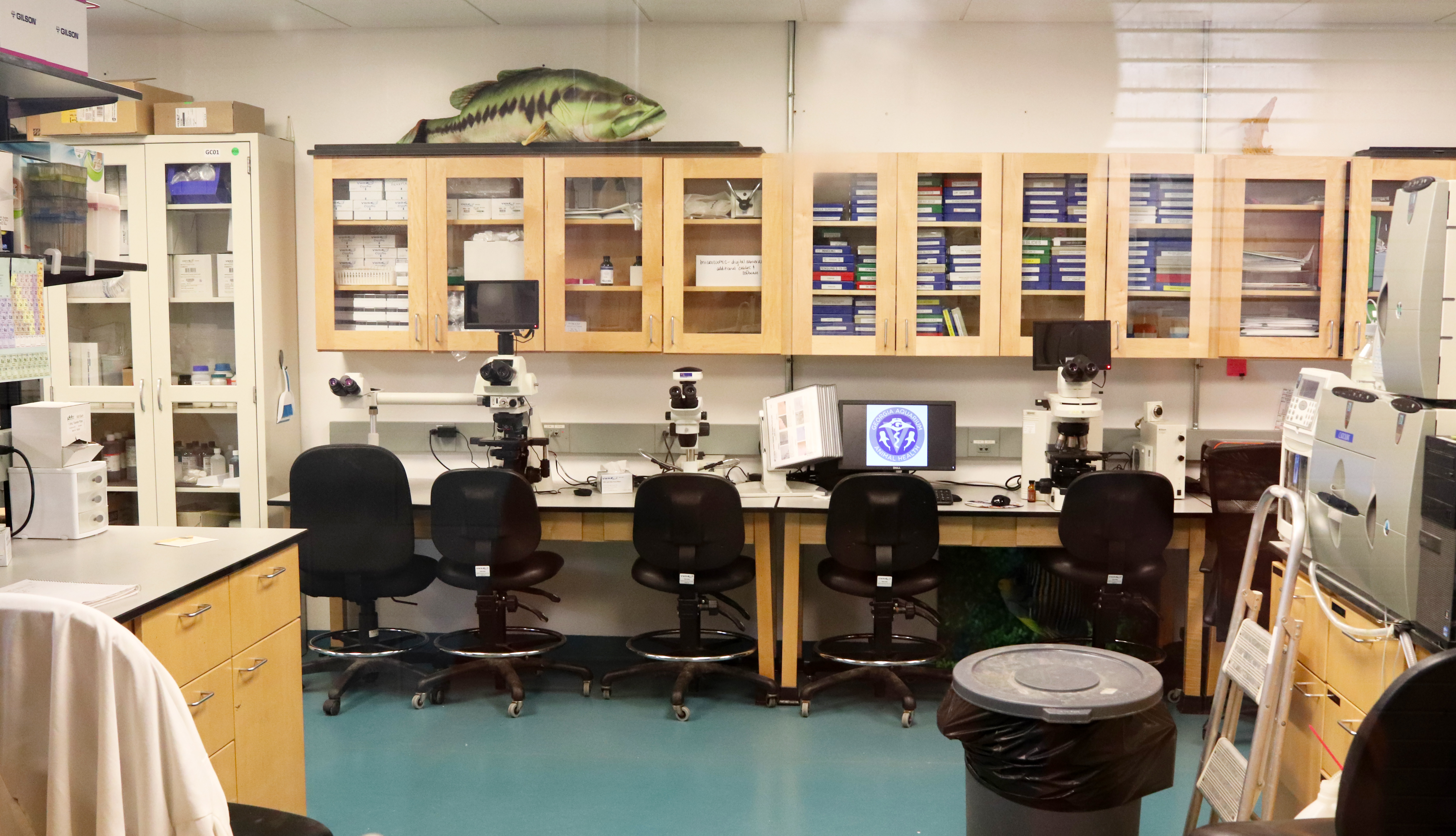
Lab room at the aquarium

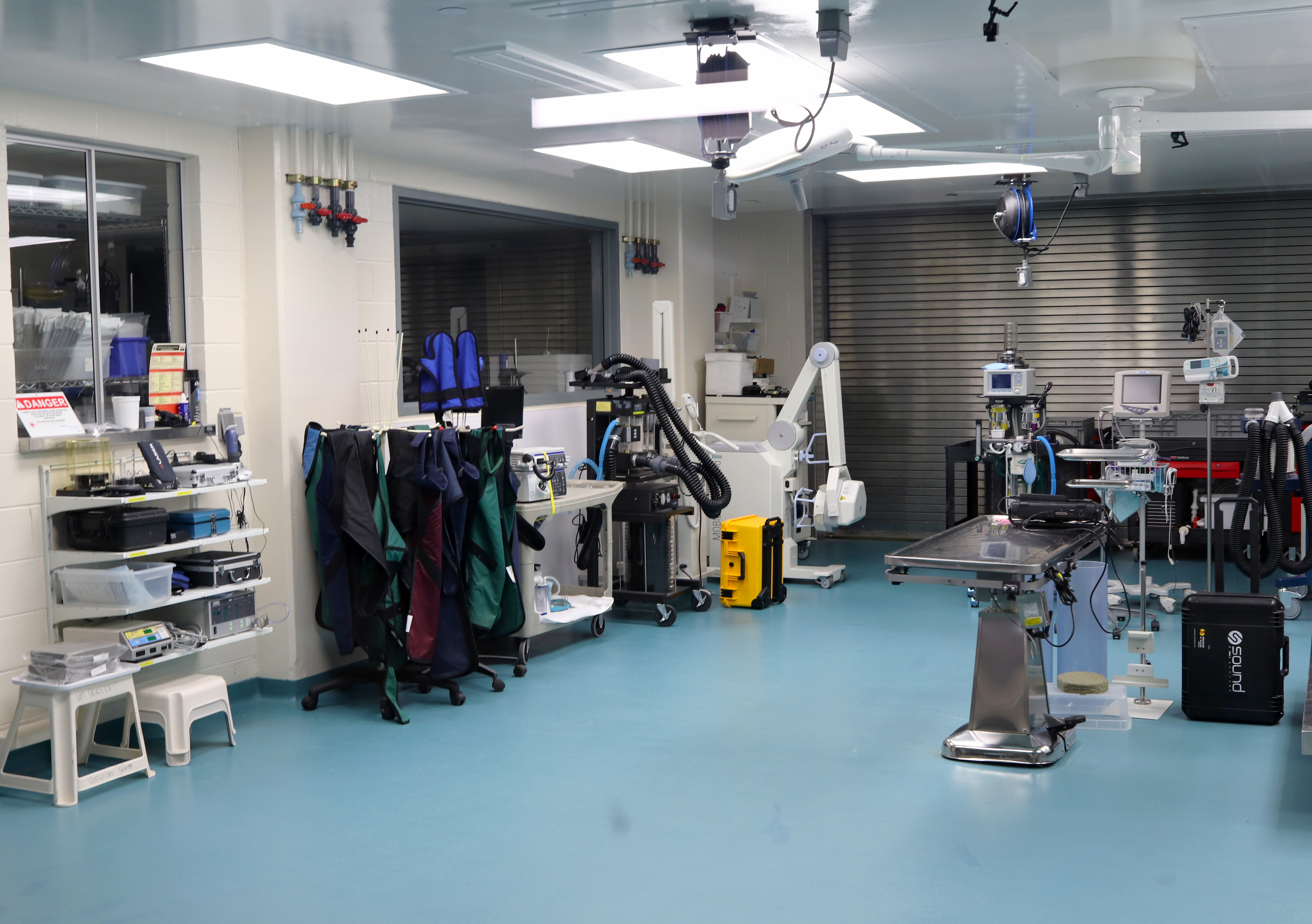
Hospital area at the aquarium

The acquisition of the male beluga whales, previously suffering in an inadequate environment, was hailed by Marcus as a prime example of the type of conservation activities the aquarium should be involved with. Roughly 100 tarpons stranded in a tidal pool at Skidaway Island, off the Georgia coast, were rescued for the collection. Coral used in exhibits at the Aquarium is grown in a collaboration between Georgia Tech and the University of the South Pacific, produced by suspending blocks of pumice over a reef near the village of Tagaqe, Fiji for eight months to allow seaweeds and reef invertebrates to establish colonies.

As of 2016, the Georgia Aquarium stated that it would not be taking whales or dolphins that have been caught in the wild.

In 2019, the Georgia Aquarium began participating in a coral project in conjunction with the Association of Zoos and Aquariums and other AZA-accredited facilities. In an effort to save coral from a coral-bleaching disease in the Florida Keys, Georgia Aquarium is housing multiple species of coral at their facility. During the same year, the aquarium temporarily provided housing for the sea turtles of the Georgia Sea Turtle Center, which were evacuated ahead of Hurricane Dorian.

The aquarium is involved in research initiatives that focus on whale sharks in the Yucatán Peninsula, beluga whales in Alaska, penguins in South Africa, manatees in Quintana Roo, Mexico, loggerhead sea turtles on the Georgia coast and spotted eagle rays in Sarasota, Florida. Its newest research project centers on bottle-nose dolphins in the Indian River Lagoon. As permanent residents at the top of the lagoon's food chain, they are indicators of its environmental health. The aquarium is partnering with Florida Atlantic University and the federal government to monitor the health of these animals, and to identify potential threats such as pollution and emerging infectious diseases.

== New facilities and programs ==
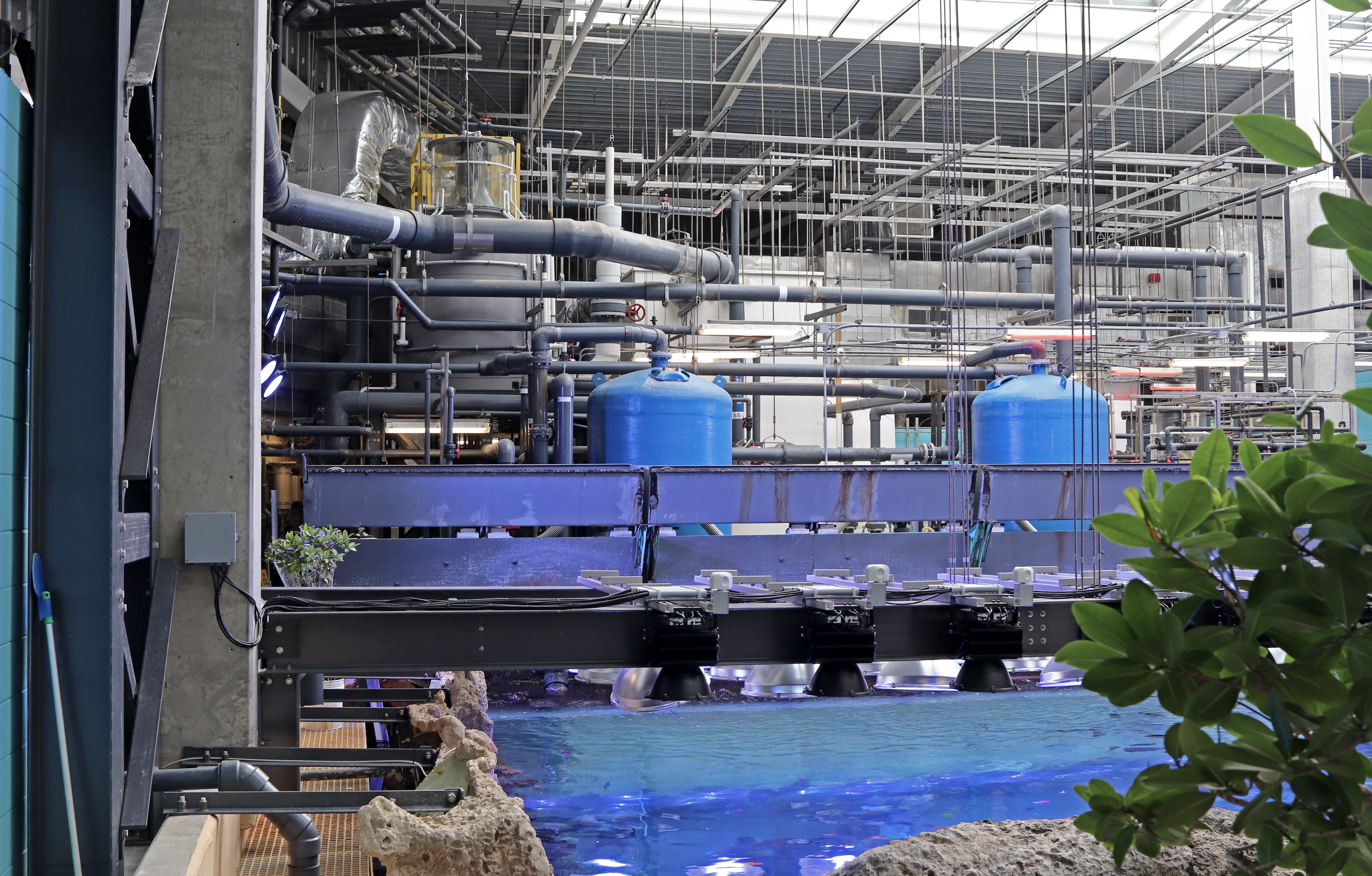
A glimpse into the inner workings of the coral reef tank

In May 2008, the aquarium announced plans to build a $110 million expansion for a new dolphin exhibit. The expansion covers 84,000 square feet (7,800 m^{2}) and contains 1.8 million US gallons (6,800,000 L) of water. Located on the west side of the facility, the exhibit features space for live presentations, observation windows, and opportunities for visitors to interact with animals.

Construction began later in 2008 and was completed in late 2010. During part of the construction, the aquarium's three beluga whales were temporarily relocated to SeaWorld San Antonio. Beluga whales are very sensitive to sound, and while officials had not noted any excessive amounts of stress, it was decided to remove them anyway and eliminate the possibility. Unexpectedly, one of the three belugas, Nico, died at SeaWorld on October 31, 2009. A preliminary necropsy was unable to determine if Nico's death was caused by the move or by something else.

The Dolphin Celebration show opened to the public on April 2, 2011, and has been controversial. In 2016, the aquarium changed the format of the show to make it more educational.

On January 1, 2011, the aquarium purchased Marineland of Florida for a reported $9.1 million. The seller was Jim Jacoby, a metro Atlanta developer and member of the Georgia Aquarium board of directors, who bought the park in 2004 and re-developed it. In 2019, another company acquired Marineland of Florida.

In 2018, the aquarium announced its largest expansion to date, a $100 million, 45,000-square-foot endeavor featuring a new 1-million-US-gallon (3,800,000 L) saltwater shark gallery, Sharks: Predators of the Deep, and a redesigned main entrance, planned to be completed in late Fall 2020. This new exhibit would include a variety of shark species. A temporary entrance was constructed by the end of 2018 to facilitate construction of the new expansion. The exhibit officially opened on October 23, 2020.

In 2025, the aquarium was the first in the U.S. to offer a free app that provides filters and AI tools to improve visibility of animals, signs, and menus for visually-impaired visitors.

== Gallery ==
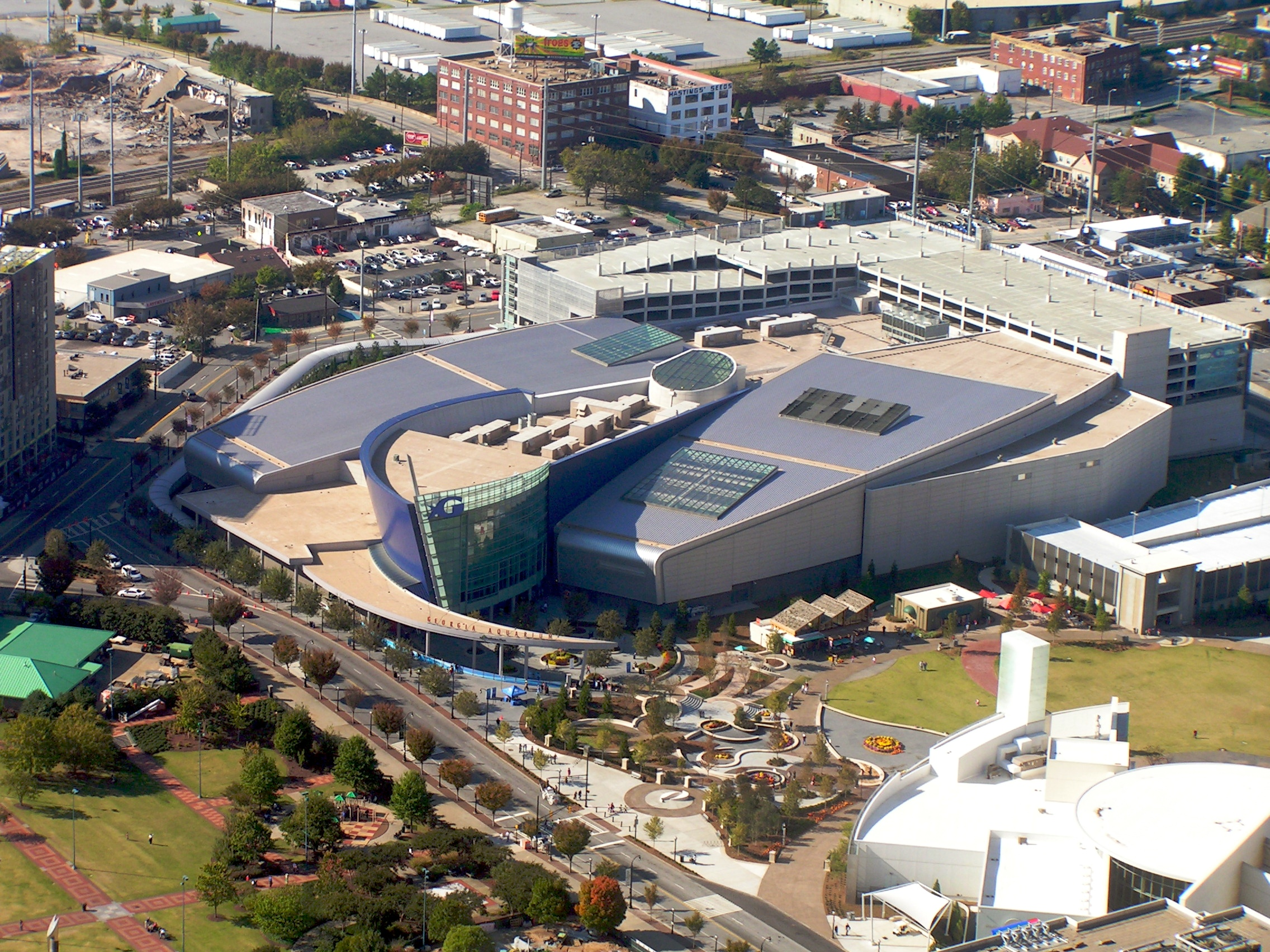
Aerial view of the facility

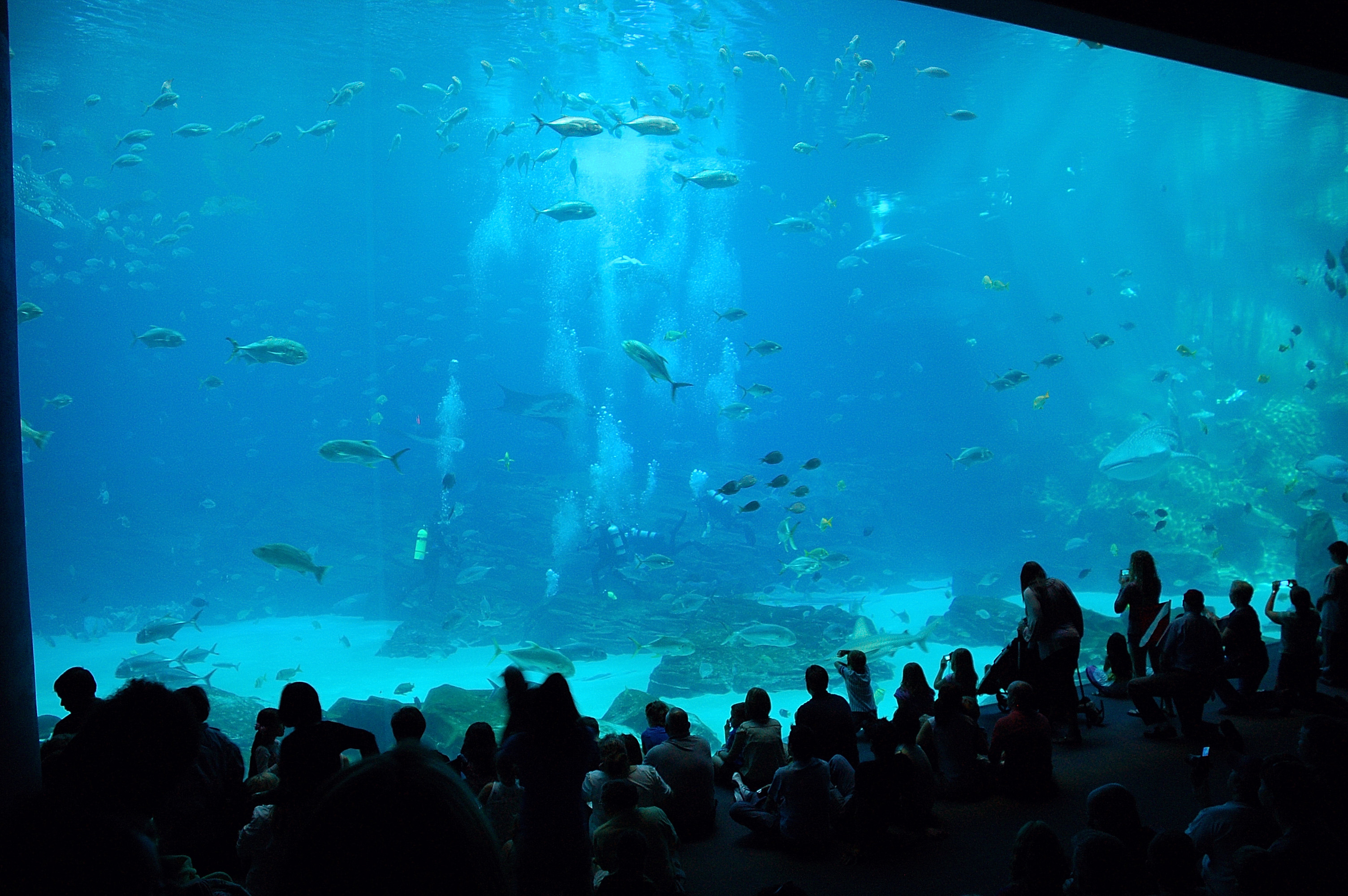
Visitors observe US Navy divers as they dive in a tank at the Aquarium.

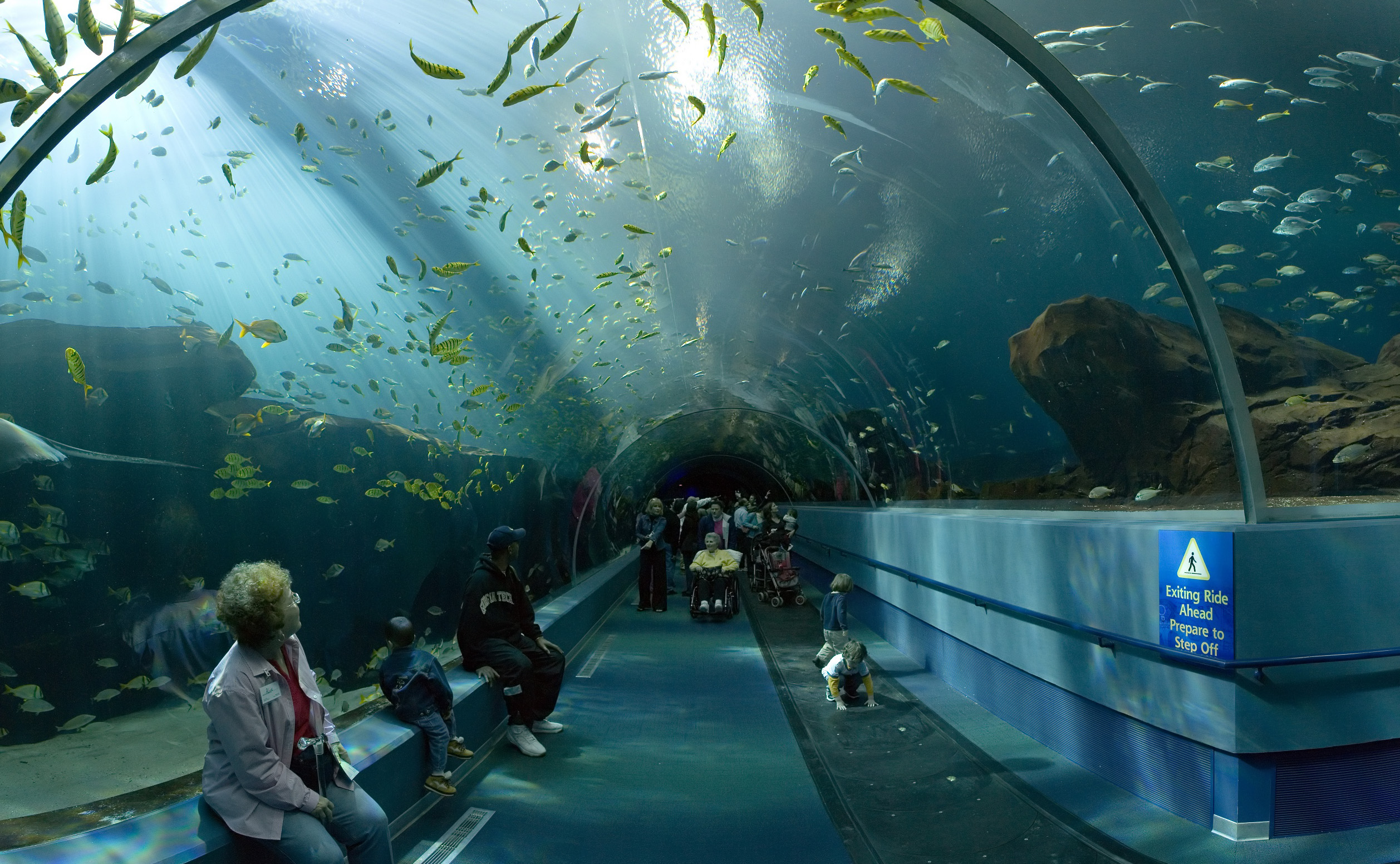
The Ocean Voyager exhibit tunnel

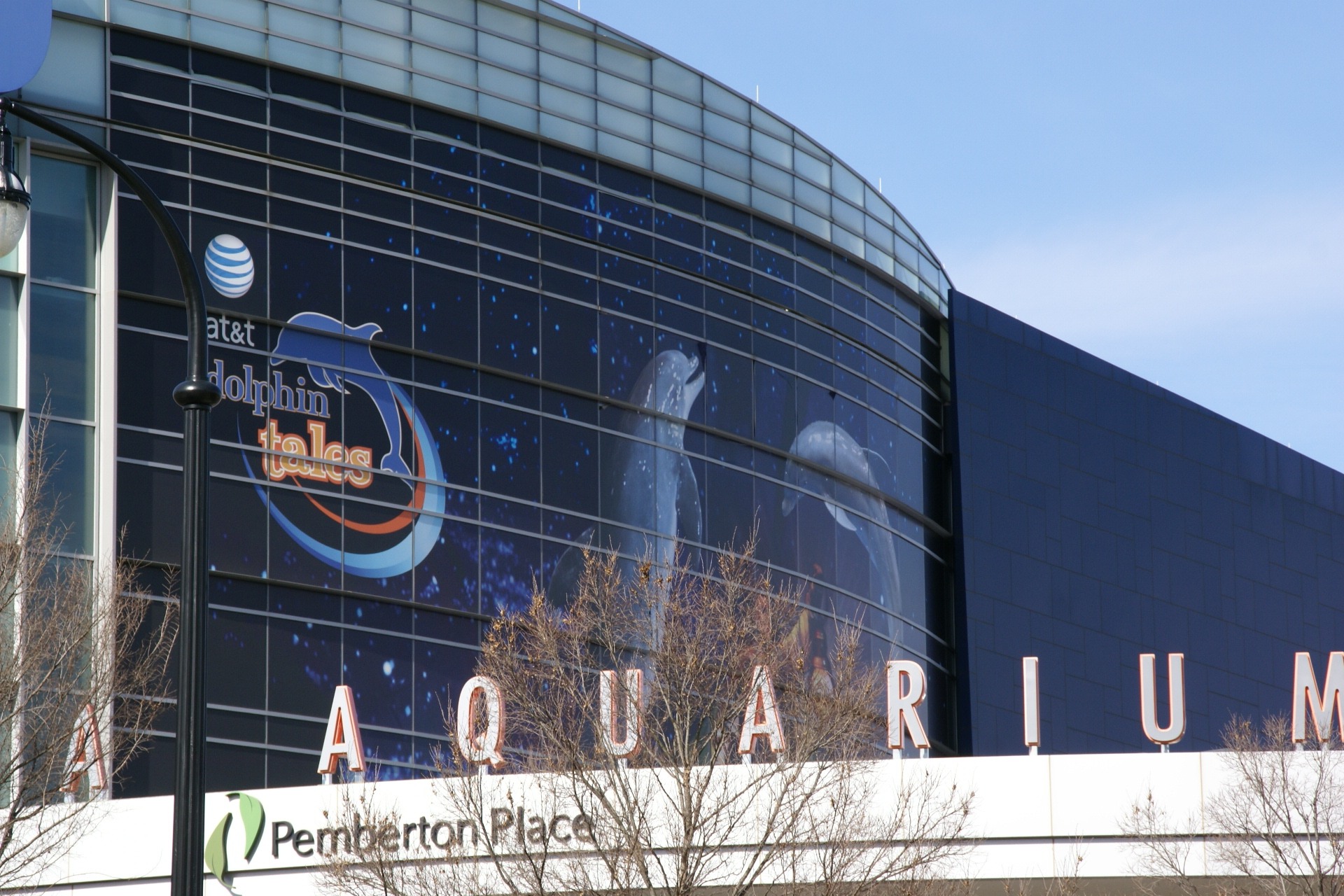
Georgia Aquarium exterior, with advertisements for the dolphin show

== Incidents ==
Suicide
In February 2015, the new vice president José Luis Barbero died by suicide after a campaign alleging mistreatment of dolphins during his service as trainer in Marineland Mallorca.

Attempted import
In 2015, the aquarium applied to import 18 belugas from Russia; it had previously placed an order for their capture and planned to send them on breeding loans to partnered parks such as Shedd Aquarium and SeaWorld, though SeaWorld ultimately opted out of the agreement. However, the permit was denied by the National Marine Fisheries Service, prompting Georgia Aquarium to sue. In September 2015, a federal district court ruled that "Georgia Aquarium failed to demonstrate that its permit would not result in the taking of additional animals beyond those authorized by the permit", and that the denial would stand.

== See also ==
- Hurghada Grand Aquarium
