= List of tallest buildings in Tampa =

Skyline of Tampa
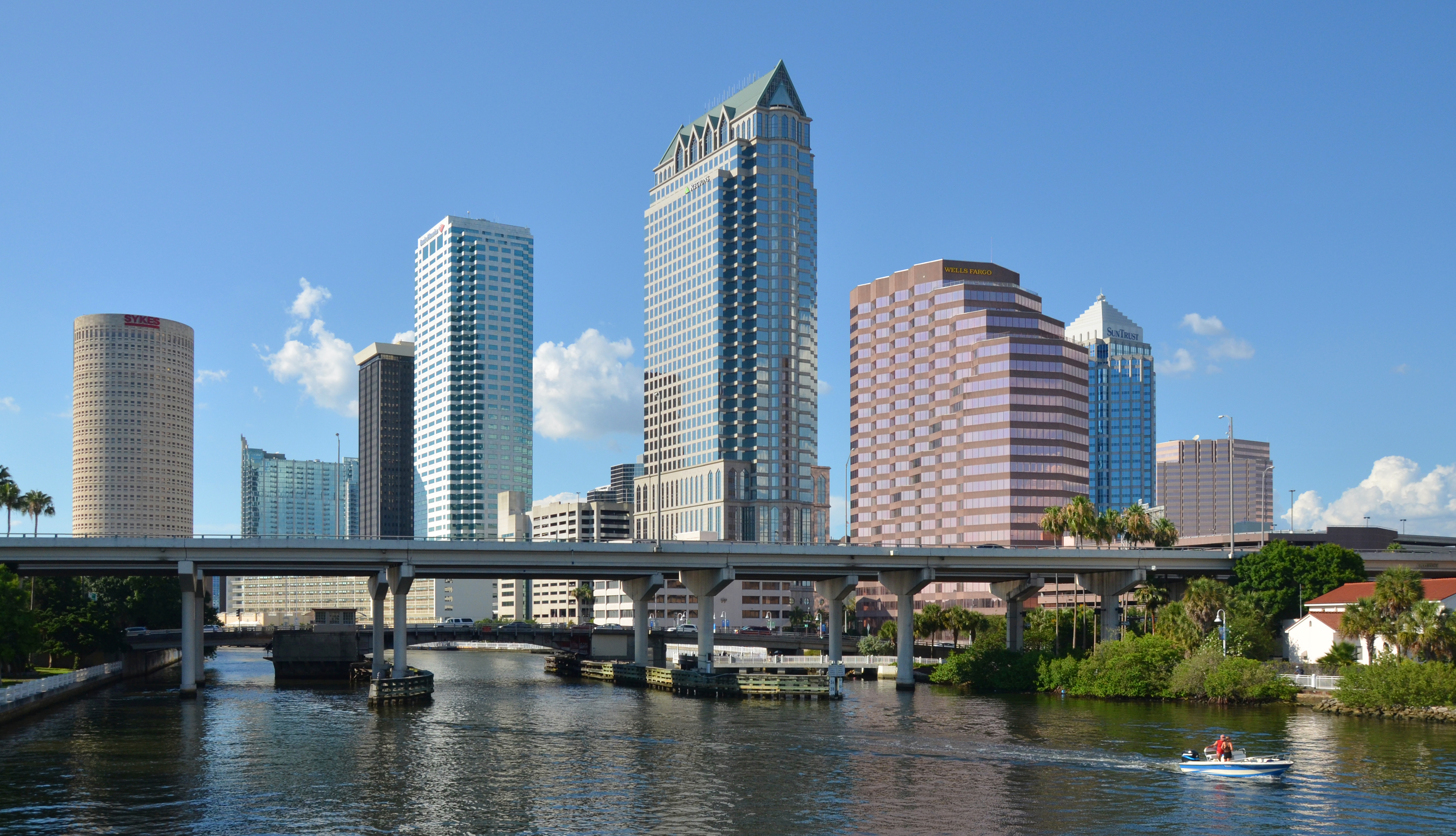
- Downtown Tampa in 2015
- Tallest building: 100 North Tampa (1992)
- Tallest building height: 579 ft (176.5 m)
- First 150 m+ building: One Tampa City Center (1981)

Number of tall buildings (2026)
- Taller than 100 m (328 ft): 12 + 2 T/O
- Taller than 150 m (492 ft): 4 + 1 T/O

Number of tall buildings — feet
- Taller than 200 ft (61.0 m): 54 + 2 T/O
- Taller than 300 ft (91.4 m): 17 + 2 T/O

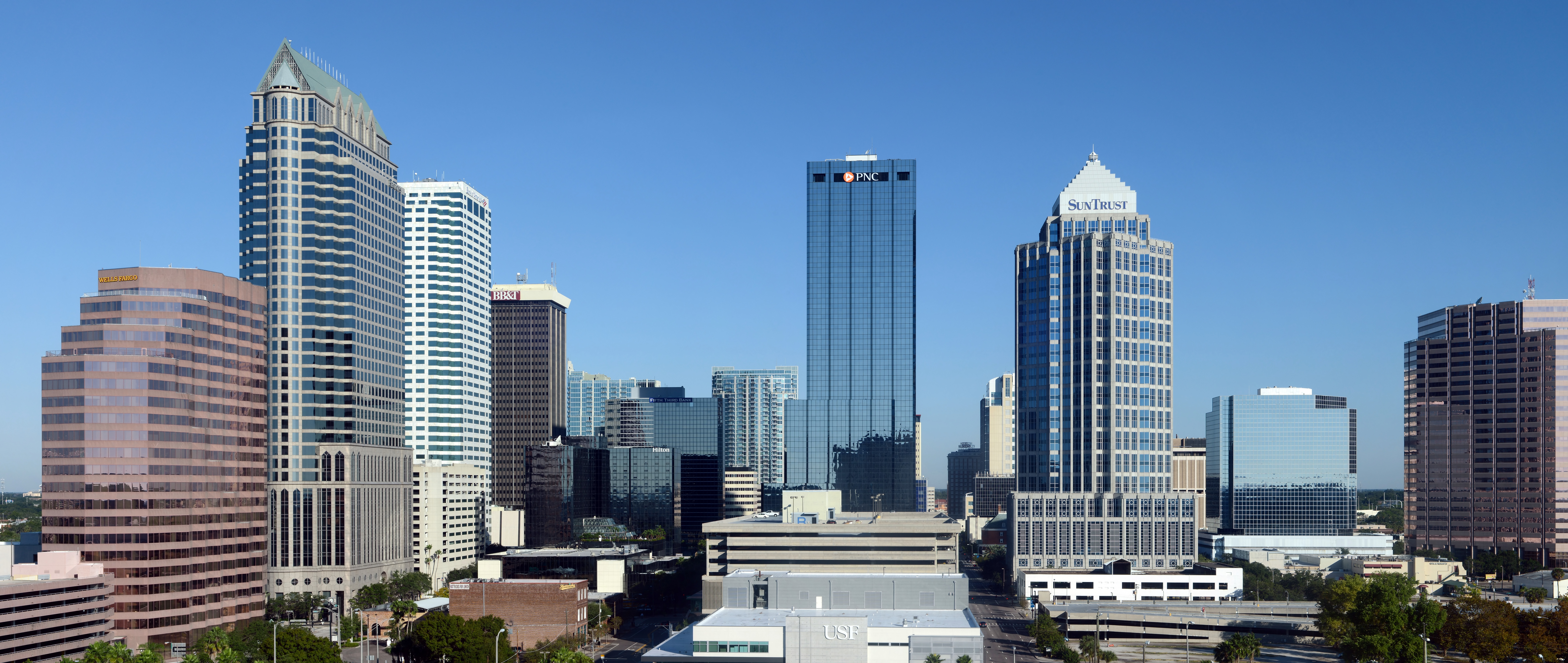
Northwards view of Tampa's skyline in 2013

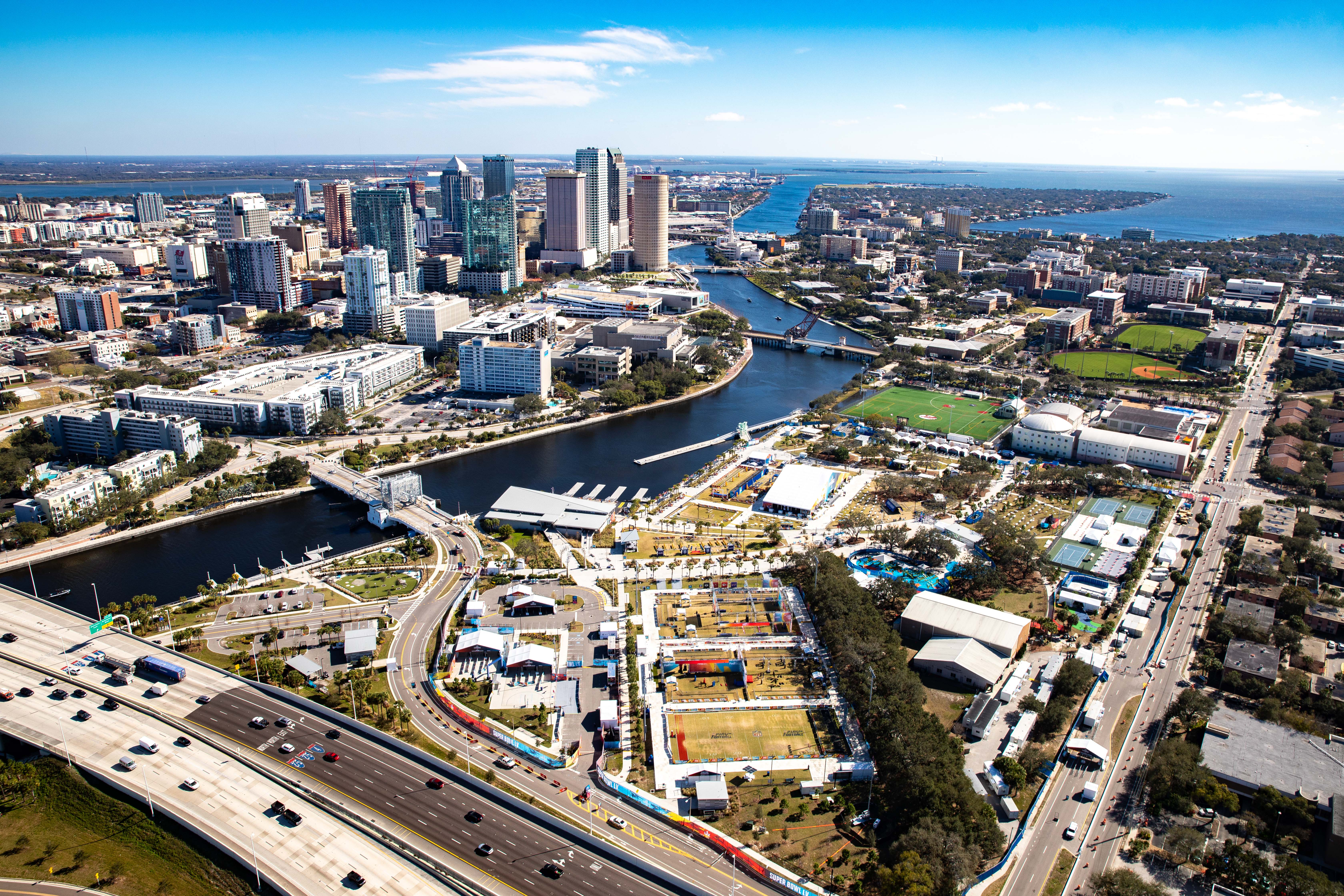
Aerial view of Tampa and the Raymond James Stadium in 2021

Tampa is the largest city on the Gulf Coast of the U.S. state of Florida, with over 3.4 million inhabitants residing in the Tampa Bay Area. The city is home to 56 high-rises that stand taller than 200 feet (61 m) as of 2026, 19 of which have a height greater than 300 feet (91 m), the most of any city in Florida outside of the Miami metropolitan area. The tallest building in Tampa is the 42-story 100 North Tampa, which rises 579 feet (176 m) and was completed in 1992. The structure is the tallest building in the state outside of the Miami metropolitan area and Jacksonville. Together with St. Petersburg, the Tampa Bay Area has 31 buildings taller than 300 feet (91 m).

Tampa's first high-rise is regarded to be the Citizens Bank Building, built in 1913 to a height of 10 stories. The Hotel Floridan was the first to surpass 200 feet (61 m) when it was completed in 1926, being 230 feet (70 m) tall. It remained as the tallest building in Tampa for four decades until 1966, with the opening of the 280-foot (85 m) Franklin Exchange Building. From the 1970s to the early 1990s, Tampa underwent a high-rise construction boom that reshaped its downtown skyline, as well as a growing number of residential towers along Bayshore Boulevard. 100 North Tampa, Bank of America Plaza, One Tampa City Center, and Truist Place—Tampa's four tallest buildings, as well as the cylindrical Rivergate Tower—were completed between 1981 and 1992.

Tampa's skyline has grown substantially in the early 21st century, with the city doubling its count of 200 feet (61 m) buildings between 2000 and 2020, from 19 to 39. A brief surge in high-rise development took place before the Great Recession. Another construction boom began in the second half of the 2010s. The ongoing boom has seen the skyline expand eastwards to the Channel District and the new Water Street neighborhood, whose development began in 2017. The tallest building in Water Street, the 319 feet (97 m) Tampa EDITION, was completed in 2022. One Tampa, Tampa's tallest building in over 30 years, is topped out and will be completed in 2027 as the city's tallest residential building. Simultaneously, the Pendry Tampa, is topped out and will be conpleted 2027. Tampa's current high-rise boom is occurring alongside a similar boom in St. Petersburg.

The majority of high-rises in Tampa are located in downtown and adjacent neighborhoods. The main downtown skyline is bounded to the west by the Hillsborough River, while the Lee Roy Selmon Expressway separates it from Water Street and the Channel District. The Garrison Channel separates downtown and Water Street from Harbour Island, which has a small grouping of high-rises on its northern half, four of which are taller than 200 feet (61 m). Southwest of downtown, the waterfront road of Bayshore Boulevard features residential towers alongside its path.

== History ==
Number of high-rise buildings by height in Tampa by the end of each year, based on the list below. Click on the legend to toggle a specific height on or off. View chart definition.

== Cityscape ==
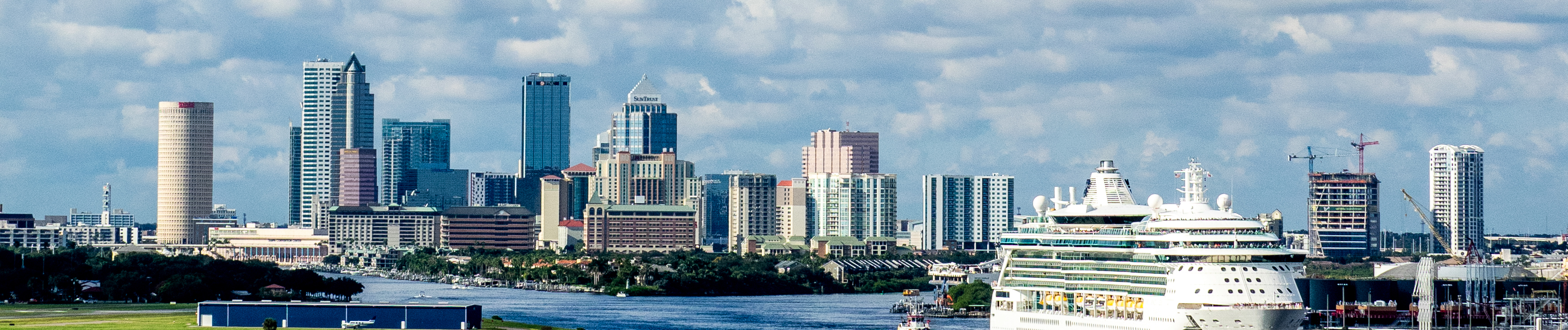
Downtown Tampa in 2018, partially obscured by the high-rises of Harbour Island. The Water Street neighborhood is seen under construction on the far right.

== Map of tallest buildings ==
The maps below show the location of every building taller than 200 feet (61 m) in Tampa. One map covers Downtown Tampa and adjacent neighborhoods, where most of the tallest buildings are located. Another covers the high-rises along Bayshore Boulevard. Each marker is numbered by the building's height rank, and colored by the decade of its completion.

=== Downtown Tampa ===
Buildings taller than 200 feet (61 m) in Downtown Tampa area.
- 1950s and before
- 1960s
- 1970s
- 1980s
- 1990s
- 2000s
- 2010s
- 2020s
100 North Tampa, Bank of America Plaza, One Tampa City Center, Truist Place, ONE Tampa, Element, Park Tower, Rivergate Tower, SkyPoint, Pendry Tampa, Sam M. Gibbons Courthouse, Hillsborough County Center, AER Apartments, Towers of Channelside East, Towers of Channelside West, Tampa Marriott Waterside, Tampa EDITION Hotel & Residences, Wells Fargo Center, JW Marriott Tampa Water Street, Thousand & One, Heron East Tower, Nine15, Franklin Exchange Building, Fifth Third Center, SkyHouse Channelside, Cora, USF Health Morsani College Of Medicine, The Henry, Hyde Park House, Channel Club Apartments, Asher Residences, 501 East Kennedy, Embassy Suites Hotel Downtown, Heron West Tower, The MAV, Harrison at Encore!, The Grand View, Hotel Flor Tampa, The Plaza Harbour Island, 500 Harbour Island, Manor at Harbour Island, Parkside of One Bayshore
1 100 North Tampa
2 Bank of America Plaza
3 One Tampa City Center
4 Truist Place
5 ONE Tampa
6 Element
7 Park Tower
8 Rivergate Tower
9 SkyPoint
10 Pendry Tampa
11 Sam M. Gibbons Courthouse
12 Hillsborough County Center
14 AER Apartments
15 Towers of Channelside East
16 Towers of Channelside West
17 Tampa Marriott Waterside
18 Tampa EDITION Hotel & Residences
19 Wells Fargo Center
20 JW Marriott Tampa Water Street
22 Thousand & One
23 Heron East Tower
25 Nine15
26 Franklin Exchange Building
27 Fifth Third Center
28 SkyHouse Channelside
31 Cora
33 USF Health Morsani College Of Medicine
34 The Henry
36 Channel Club Apartments
37 Asher Residences
39 501 East Kennedy
40 Embassy Suites Hotel Downtown
41 Heron West Tower
42 The MAV
43 Harrison at Encore!
44 The Grand View
45 Hotel Flor Tampa
48 The Plaza Harbour Island
49 500 Harbour Island
50 Manor at Harbour Island
55 Parkside of One Bayshore

=== Bayshore ===
Buildings taller than 200 feet (61 m) on Bayshore Boulevard.
- 1970s
- 1980s
- 1990s
- 2000s
- 2010s
- 2020s
13. Ritz-Carlton Residences - Tower 2, 21. Ritz-Carlton Residences - Tower 1, 24. Virage Bayshore, 29. The Alagon on Bayshore, 30. The Pinnacle on Bayshore, 32. Altura Bayshore, 35. Hyde Park House, 38. The Stovall, 47. The Bellamy on Bayshore, 49. Atrium on the Bayshore, 50. The Sanctuary at Alexandra Place, 53. Bayshore Regency, 54. Monte Carlo Towers
13 Ritz-Carlton Residences - Tower 2
21 Ritz-Carlton Residences - Tower 1
24 Virage Bayshore
29 The Alagon on Bayshore
30 The Pinnacle on Bayshore
32 Altura Bayshore
35 Hyde Park House
38 The Stovall
47 The Bellamy on Bayshore
49 Atrium on the Bayshore
50 The Sanctuary at Alexandra Place
53 Bayshore Regency
54 Monte Carlo Towers

== Tallest buildings ==
This list ranks Tampa skyscrapers that stand at least 200 feet (61 m) tall as of 2026, using standard height measurements. This includes spires and architectural details, but does not include antenna masts. The "Year" column indicates the year in which a building was completed. Buildings tied in height are sorted by year of completion, and then alphabetically. Estimated heights are in italics.

Was the tallest building in Tampa upon completion
Topped out but not yet completed

Rank	Name	Image	Location	Height ft (m)	Floors	Year	Purpose	Notes
1	100 North Tampa		Downtown 27°56′44″N 82°27′30″W	579 (176.5)	42	1992	Office	Tallest building in Tampa since 1992. Tallest building along Florida's Gulf Coast. Also known as the Regions Building and AmSouth Building.
2	Bank of America Plaza		Downtown 27°56′49″N 82°27′33″W	577 (175.9)	42	1986	Office	Tallest building in Tampa from 1986 to 1992. Tallest building completed in Tampa in the 1980s. Only two feet shorter than the city's tallest building, 100 North Tampa. Notably damaged in a 2002 plane crash, in which a young pilot stole and crashed a Cessna 172 into the building's north face.
3	One Tampa City Center		Downtown 27°56′49″N 82°27′25″W	537 (163.7)	39	1981	Office	Stood as the tallest building in Florida from 1981 to 1984, and tallest in Tampa until 1986. It was then surpassed by the Southeast Financial Center, in Miami.
4	Truist Place		Downtown 27°56′49″N 82°27′22″W	525 (160.0)	36	1992	Office	Formerly known as SunTrust Financial Centre.
5	ONE Tampa		Downtown 27°56′55″N 82°27′35″W	494 (150.5)	42	2027	Residential	Topped out in 2026. Tallest residential building in Tampa. Tallest building completed in Tampa in the 2020s.
6	Element		Downtown 27°57′03″N 82°27′35″W	460 (140.2)	34	2009	Residential	Tallest building completed in Tampa in the 2000s.
7	Park Tower		Downtown 27°56′52″N 82°27′34″W	458 (139.6)	36	1972	Office	Tallest building in Tampa from 1972 to 1981. Tallest building completed in Tampa in the 1970s. Formerly known as the Lykes Building and the BB&T Building.
8	Rivergate Tower		Downtown 27°56′50″N 82°27′38″W	454 (138.4)	32	1988	Office	
9	SkyPoint		Downtown 27°57′00″N 82°27′37″W	414 (126.2)	32	2007	Residential	
10	Pendry Tampa		Downtown 27°56′40″N 82°27′30″W	409 (124.7)	37	2027	Residential	Construction began in September 2023. Topped out on October 9th, 2026.
11	Sam M. Gibbons United States Courthouse		Downtown 27°57′05″N 82°27′29″W	375 (114.3)	17	1998	Government	Named in honor of former U.S. Representative Sam Melville Gibbons.
12	Hillsborough County Center		Downtown 27°56′54″N 82°27′17″W	365 (111.3)	28	1990	Office	
13	Ritz-Carlton Residences - Tower 2	–	Bayshore 27°55′05″N 82°29′31″W	349 (106.4)	30	2026	Residential	Construction began in November 2023.
14	AER Apartments	–	Downtown 27°57′03″N 82°27′48″W	346 (105.5)	31	2024	Residential	Also known as AER in the District.
15	Towers of Channelside East		Channel District 27°56′41″N 82°26′50″W	327 (99.7)	30	2007	Residential	Part of the Towers of Channelside residential complex. Tallest building in the Channel District alongside its western counterpart.
16	Towers of Channelside West		Channel District 27°56′39″N 82°26′54″W	327 (99.7)	30	2007	Residential	Part of the Towers of Channelside residential complex. Tallest building in the Channel District alongside its eastern counterpart.
17	Tampa Marriott Waterside		Downtown 27°56′27″N 82°27′14″W	326 (99.4)	27	2000	Hotel	Tallest hotel building in Tampa.
18	Tampa EDITION Hotel & Residences		Downtown (Water Street) 27°56′38″N 82°27′02″W	319 (97.2)	28	2022	Mixed-use	Tampa's first five-star hotel and condominiums. Mixed-use residential and hotel building. Tallest mixed-use building in Tampa. Also called The Residences at the Tampa Edition.
19	Wells Fargo Center		Downtown 27°56′41″N 82°27′28″W	311 (94.8)	22	1985	Office	Formerly known as the Wachovia Center.
20	JW Marriott Tampa Water Street		Downtown 27°56′31″N 82°27′14″W	298 (90.8)	26	2020	Hotel	
21	Ritz-Carlton Residences - Tower 1	–	Bayshore 27°55′06″N 82°29′35″W	298 (91)	27	2024	Residential	Construction began in January 2022.
22	Thousand & One		Downtown (Water Street) 27°56′38″N 82°27′00″W	297 (90.4)	20	2021	Office	Also known as 1001 Water. First office tower built in Tampa in more than 25 years.
23	Heron East Tower		Downtown (Water Street) 27°56′35″N 82°26′58″W	291 (88.7)	26	2021	Residential	Part of the Heron residential complex, and the taller of its two towers.
24	Virage Bayshore		Bayshore 27°54′45″N 82°29′31″W	288 (88) (Note: Sources do not state the exact height of this building. This figure was determined using Google Earth by subtracting the altitude of the building's lowest main pedestrian open-air entrance from the highest architectural point.)	24	2020	Residential	Tallest building in Bayshore. First condo tower built in 15 years in Bayshore.
25	Nine15		Downtown 27°57′07″N 82°27′33″W	284 (86.7)	23	2017	Residential	Tallest building completed in Tampa in the 2010s.
26	Franklin Exchange Building		Downtown 27°56′59″N 82°27′29″W	280 (85.3)	22	1966	Office	Tallest building in Tampa from 1966 to 1972. Tallest building completed in Tampa in the 1960s.
27	Fifth Third Center		Downtown 27°56′50″N 82°27′30″W	279 (85)	19	1981	Office	Also known as the SouthTrust Building.
28	SkyHouse Channelside		Channel District 27°56′52″N 82°26′49″W	275 (83.8)	23	2015	Residential	
29	The Alagon on Bayshore		Bayshore 27°54′37″N 82°29′28″W	273 (83)	23	2006	Residential	
30	The Pinnacle on Bayshore		Bayshore 27°54′16″N 82°29′25″W	272 (82.9)	23	1975	Residential	
31	Cora		Downtown (Water Street) 27°56′41″N 82°27′00″W	272 (82.9)	23	2021	Residential	Also known by its street address, 1011 East Cumberland Avenue.
32	Altura Bayshore	–	Bayshore 27°55′14″N 82°29′28″W	271 (83)	22	2024	Residential	
33	USF Health Morsani College Of Medicine		Downtown (Water Street) 27°56′38″N 82°26′58″W	266 (81)	13	2020	Education	Part of the University of South Florida.
34	The Henry		Downtown 27°57′08″N 82°27′41″W	262 (80)	23	2021	Residential	Named after businessman Henry Plant. Student accommodation.
35	Hyde Park House		Bayshore 27°55′35″N 82°28′55″W	259 (79)	22	2022	Residential	
36	Channel Club Apartments		Channel District 27°57′07″N 82°26′53″W	257 (78)	21	2018	Residential	
37	Asher Residences		Downtown (Water Street) 27°56′41″N 82°27′03″W	257 (78)	22	2022	Residential	
38	The Stovall	–	Bayshore 27°55′04″N 82°29′29″W	255 (78)	22	2001	Residential	
39	501 East Kennedy		Downtown 27°56′53″N 82°27′20″W	253 (77)	19	1981	Office	Also known as One Mack-Cali Center.
40	Embassy Suites Hotel Downtown		Downtown 27°56′32″N 82°27′18″W	253 (77)	21	2006	Hotel	
41	Heron West Tower		Downtown (Water Street) 27°56′35″N 82°27′00″W	245 (75)	21	2021	Residential	Part of the Heron residential complex, and the shorter of its two towers.
42	The MAV	–	Channel District 27°57′10″N 82°26′47″W	238 (73)	19	2022	Residential	
43	Harrison at Encore!	–	Encore	237 (72)	20	2026	Mixed-use	Construction began in October 2024, topped out in October of 2025, and was completed on August 12, 2026.
44	The Grand View	–	Harbour Island 27°56′23″N 82°27′08″W	235 (71.6)	20	2003	Residential	
45	Hotel Flor Tampa		Downtown 27°57′07″N 82°27′31″W	230 (70.1)	18	1926	Hotel	Tallest building in Tampa from 1926 to 1966. Opened as the Hotel Floridan. An extensive reservation took place between 2005 and 2012, after which the hotel reopened as the Floridan Palace Hotel. Renamed Hotel Flor Tampa in 2024.
46	345 Bayshore	–	Hyde Park 27°56′22″N 82°27′44″W	229 (70)	22	1998	Residential	
47	The Bellamy on Bayshore	–	Bayshore 27°54′13″N 82°29′24″W	229 (69.8)	21	2006	Residential	
48	The Plaza Harbour Island	–	Harbour Island 27°56′17″N 82°27′06″W	225 (69)	20	2007	Residential	
49	500 Harbour Island	–	Harbour Island 27°56′18″N 82°27′03″W	225 (69)	21	2017	Residential	
50	Manor at Harbour Island	–	Harbour Island 27°56′18″N 82°27′08″W	225 (69)	21	2017	Residential	
51	Atrium on the Bayshore	–	Bayshore 27°55′30″N 82°29′03″W	223 (68)	23	1982	Residential	
52	The Sanctuary at Alexandra Place	–	Bayshore 27°55′20″N 82°29′16″W	217 (66)	17	2020	Residential	
53	Bayshore Regency	–	Bayshore 27°54′43″N 82°29′30″W	212 (65)	20	1988	Residential	
54	Monte Carlo Towers	–	Bayshore 27°54′58″N 82°29′32″W	209 (64)	24	1984	Residential	
55	Parkside of One Bayshore	–	Hyde Park 27°56′29″N 82°27′36″W	200 (61)	17	2005	Residential	
56	Midtown East	–	Midtown 27°57′14″N 82°30′07″W	200 (61) (Note: Sources do not state the exact height of this building. This figure is a minimum estimate according to the source.)	18	2025	Office	Construction began in January 2023. Topped-out in 2025.

== Tallest under construction or proposed ==
=== Under construction ===
The following table includes buildings under construction in Tampa that are expected to be at least 200 feet (61 m) tall as of 2026, based on standard height measurement. The “Year” column indicates the expected year of completion. Buildings that are on hold are not included.

Name	Location	Height ft (m)	Floors	Year	Purpose	Notes
X Tampa	Downtown	334 (102)	29	2026	Residential	Construction began in November 2022. Was on hold between October 2023 and 2024.
Manor Riverwalk	Downtown	—	24	2026	Residential	Also known as Kennedy and Parker - Tower 3. Construction began June of 2026.

=== Proposed ===
The following table ranks approved and proposed buildings in Tampa that are expected to be at least 200 feet (61 m) tall as of 2026, based on standard height measurement. The “Year” column indicates the expected year of completion. Table entries with dashes "–" indicate that information about the building is unknown or has not been released.

Name	Location	Height ft (m)	Floors	Year	Status	Notes
Elliott Tower	Downtown	740 (225)	70	2031	Approved	Would become the tallest building in Tampa if completed.
601 N. Ashley Drive	Downtown	631 (192)	48	–	Proposed	Would become the tallest building in Tampa if completed.
The Icon - Tower 1	Downtown	575 (175)	48	–	Approved	Icon phase of the Manor Riverwalk. The project is featuring four towers from 8 to 48 stories.
The Icon - Tower 2	Downtown	502 (153)	39	–	Approved	Icon phase of the Manor Riverwalk. The project is featuring four towers from 8 to 48 stories.
Seasons Apartments	Downtown	476 (145)	41	2026	Approved	Two-part tower called Seasons Apartments and Suites. This tower would be called Seasons Apartments and have 487 residents units.
Morgan & Brorein	Water Street	418 (127)	30	2027	Proposed	Will feature three towers.
1242 Chanelside Drive	Channel District	390 (119)	27	–	Approved	Approved in November 2023.
505 Tyler	Downtown	383 (117)	35	–	Proposed	
Eleve' 61	Channel District	382 (116)	36	2026	On hold	
Congregation Rodeph Sholom	Bayshore	353 (108)	28	–	Proposed	Would become the tallest building in Bayshore if built.
940 Channelside	Channel District	350 (107)	31	–	Proposed	
Seasons Suites	Downtown	325 (99)	27	2026	Approved	Two-part tower called Seasons Apartments and Suites. This tower would be called Season Suites and have 54 units.
Novel Bayshore	Bayshore	321 (98)	27	–	Proposed	
Vela Tower South	Channel District	298 (91)	25	–	Proposed	
110 South Boulevard	Grand Central	260 (79)	23	2026	Approved	
Heights Union Lofts	Tampa Heights	269 (82)	24	2026	Approved	
2907 Bay to Bay	Bayshore	250 (76)	23	2026	Approved	
Midtown South Tower	Midtown	247 (75)	23	2026	Approved	
Lot 10	Encore	—	28	–	Proposed	

== Timeline of tallest buildings ==
This lists buildings that once held the title of the tallest building in Tampa.

Name	Image	Street address	Years as tallest	Height ft (m)	Floors	Notes
Florida Brewing Company Building		1234 5th Avenue E.	1896–1913	75 (25)	6	
Citizens Bank Building		701 North Franklin Street	1913–1915	145 (44)	10	The height of this building was later increased to 165 ft (50 m) in 1925, resulting in it retaking the title of Tampa's tallest building.
Tampa City Hall		315 John F. Kennedy Boulevard	1915–1925	160 (49)	10	
Citizens Bank Building		701 North Franklin Street	1925 –1926	165 (50)	12	The height of this building was originally 145 ft (44 m).
Floridan Hotel		905 North Florida Avenue	1926–1966	230 (70)	17	
Franklin Exchange Building		655 North Franklin Street	1966–1972	280 (85)	22	
Park Tower		400 North Tampa Street	1972–1981	458 (140)	36	
One Tampa City Center		201 North Franklin Street	1981–1986	537 (164)	39	
Bank of America Tower		101 East Kennedy Boulevard	1986–1992	577 (176)	42	
100 North Tampa		100 North Tampa Street	1992–present	579 (177)	42	

== See also ==
- List of tallest buildings in Florida
- List of tallest buildings in Fort Lauderdale
- List of tallest buildings in Jacksonville
- List of tallest buildings in Miami
- List of tallest buildings in Miami Beach
- List of tallest buildings in Orlando
- List of tallest buildings in St. Petersburg
- List of tallest buildings in Sunny Isles Beach
