= Park Tower (Tampa) =

Skyscraper located in downtown Tampa, Florida, US

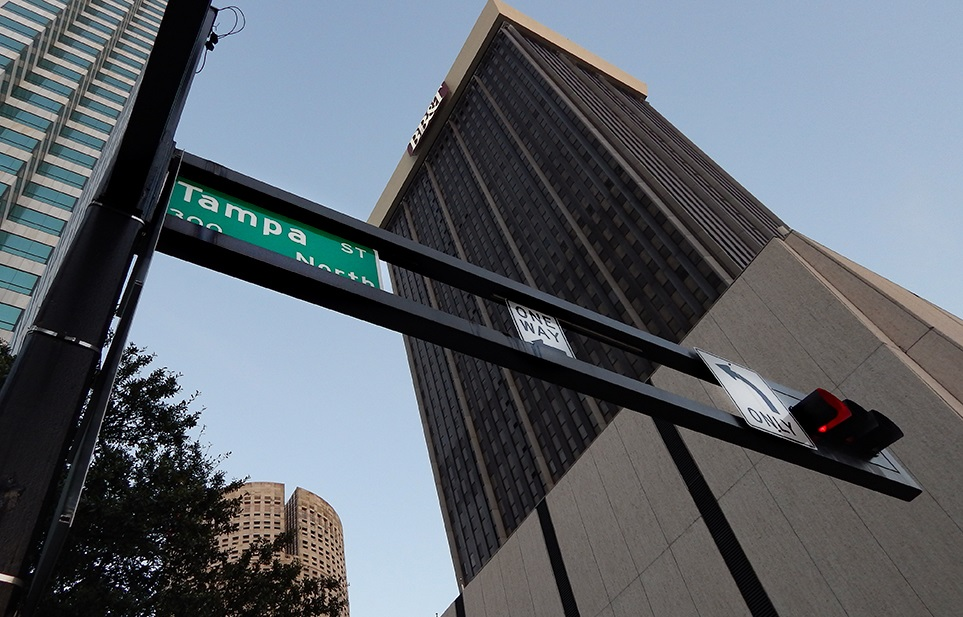
- Park Tower - Downtown Tampa, Florida 27.947739°N 82.459342°W

General information
- Type: Office
- Location: 400 N Tampa Street
- Completed: 1973
- Renovated: 2018

Height
- Roof: 458 ft (140 m)

Technical details
- Floor count: 36
- Floor area: 472,460 sq ft (43,893 m^{2})
- Designations: LEED Gold, EPA Energy Star

Website
- parktowertampa.com

Park Tower (formerly known as the Lykes Building" and currently as the "ConnectWise Building) is a skyscraper located in downtown Tampa, Florida. It is Tampa's first high-rise tower. At the time of its completion in November 1973, it was the tallest in Florida, and is currently sixth-tallest in Tampa, at 460 feet (140 m) (36 stories). It was the tallest building in Tampa until One Tampa City Center was built in 1981.

== Description ==
Park Tower is located in the heart of downtown Tampa directly across from The Tampa Riverwalk & Hillsborough River; Curtis Hixon and Gaslight Parks; the Glazer Children's Museum and the Tampa Museum of Art. It is within walking distance of the Tampa Convention Center, University of Tampa, and the David A. Straz Jr. Center for the Performing Arts.

In 2016 the tower was purchased by a joint venture consisting of affiliates of NYSE listed City Office REIT (NYSE: CIO), Feldman Equities LLC, and Tower Realty Partners for $79.75 million. The group completed a multi-million-dollar renovation in 2019. The most significant change at Park Tower is the modernization of the office building's façade by painting the exterior a lighter color and upgrading the main entrance. The building's amenities were upgraded with a modern lobby and the addition of Buddy Brew Coffee café. The office tower's updated design was created by internationally renowned architect Gensler.

Since acquiring the property, leases have been signed including the headquarters relocation of ConnectWise, CAPTRUST Advisors, LLC, Buddy Brew Coffee and Continuity Logic, LLC. Anchor tenants include BB&T, United States Department of Justice – US Attorney's Office, Level 3 Communications and Lykes Insurance.

Park Tower is LEED EB Gold Certified and EPA Energy Star certified.

The tower's amenities and businesses include FedEx Office, U.S. Post Office, Grow Financial Credit Union, Pearl Salon, First Watch (opening soon), a fitness center, conference room and a 6th-floor tenant lounge, lobby concierge and Buddy Brew Coffee.

The building has two underground 13.2kV electrical feeds from the utility power company, one of which is from the high-priority medical grid and multiple diverse entry points for fiber optic and other data cabling. Park Tower is home to a large underground Federal Reserve Vault. The building also features video-enhanced 24x7x365 on-site security.

== History ==
When it was originally built, the tower was the home of The First National Bank of Tampa, later First National Bank of Florida (First Florida Corporation). Park Tower was also the headquarters of the Lykes Brothers Corporation and is the current headquarters of Tampa based software company ConnectWise. The tower was purchased by Sterling American Property of New York City for $27.4 million in 2006 and underwent its first restoration including newly renovated elevators, air conditioning, and replacement of much of the electrical distribution system. The building later became the downtown Tampa headquarters of Colonial Bank, now BB&T.

As part of BB&T's merger with SunTrust to become Truist, BB&T closed their offices in Park Tower in January 2021. The company consolidated their footprint into the nearby Truist Place.

== See also ==
- List of tallest buildings in Tampa
- Downtown Tampa

Records
Preceded by Franklin Exchange Building	Tallest Building in Tampa; 1972—1981; 140m	Succeeded by One Tampa City Center
