= Water Street (Tampa) =

- Neighborhood
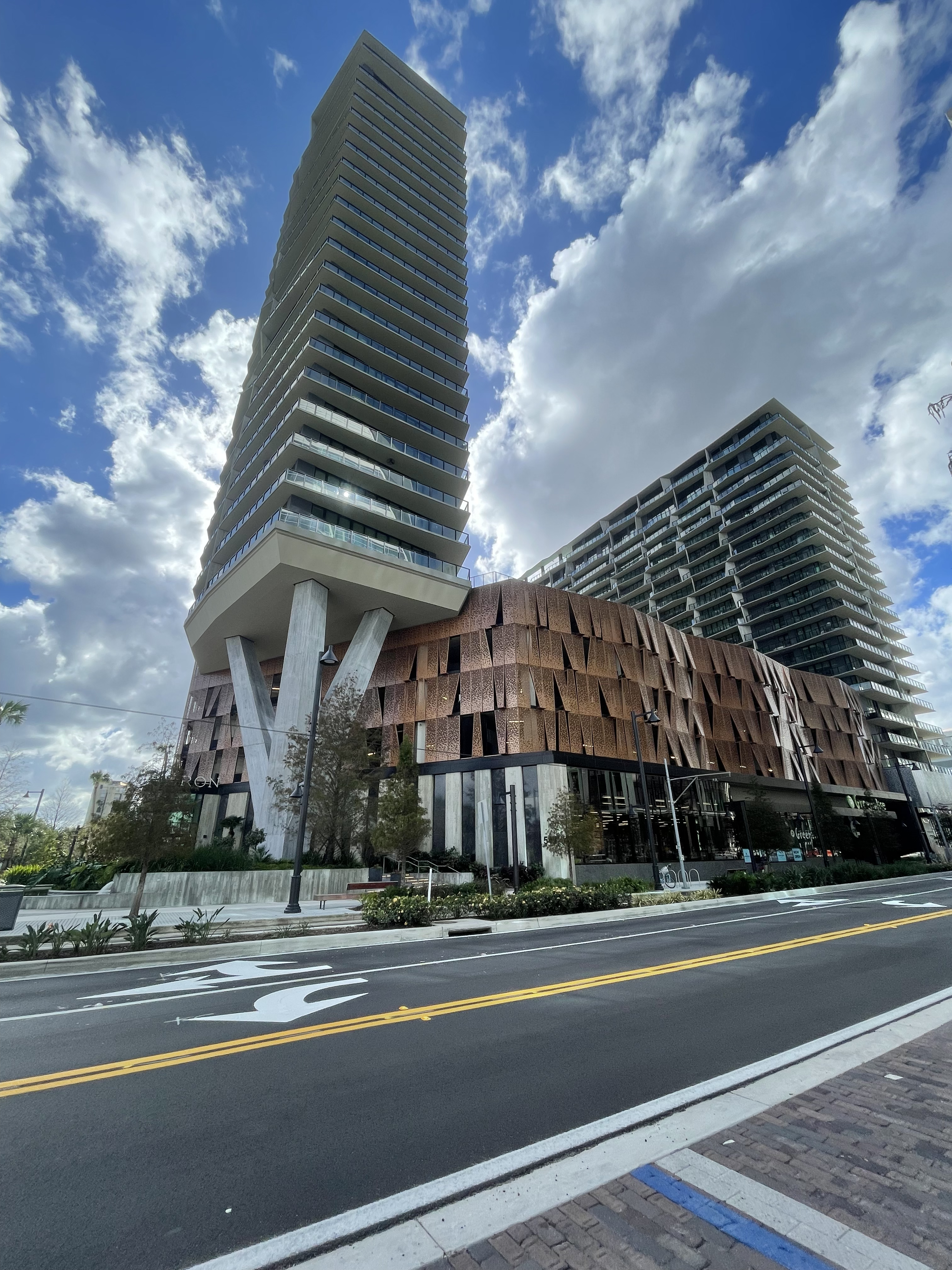
- Heron Residences, Water Street Tampa's first residence.

- Location within Florida
- Coordinates: 27.9439°N 82.4500°W
- Country: United States
- State: Florida
- County: Hillsborough
- City: Tampa
- Development Commencement: 2017

Area
  - Total: 0.077 sq mi (.2 km^{2})
- Postal code: 33602
- Website: waterstreettampa.com

Water Street is an urban neighborhood located in Downtown Tampa, Florida. The waterfront community stretches 16 blocks and includes residential, commercial, and institutional buildings along Tampa Bay. The project was developed by Strategic Property Partners, LLC., a joint venture of Cascade Investment, owned by Bill Gates, the Microsoft co-founder, and Jeffrey Vinik, owner of Tampa Bay Lightning. Phase one of the development of Water Street began in 2017 and phase two is expected to be completed in 2027. The development is estimated to cost $3 Billion and will add 3500 new residences to Tampa. Water Street is the first neighborhood in the world to be certified by the International WELL Building Institute for advancing healthy lifestyles.

== Description ==
The Water Street neighborhood is located in-between the Channel District to the north-east and Downtown Tampa, Florida to the west. The total area for the area is 50 acres (0.20 km^{2}). Water Street is connected to the downtown financial district and Channel District via the TECO Line Streetcar and the Tampa Riverwalk.

== Residential buildings ==
Water Street opened its first mixed-use residential building, Heron Residences, in April 2021. Heron is a dual tower conjoined by a 30,000 sq ft (2,800 m^{2}) garden rooftop and Publix Greenwise Market. The building was designed by architect Kohn Pedersen Fox to replicate a coral reef. The Cora is a 23-story mixed-use residential tower designed by architect COOKFOX. In 2022, the Asher, designed by Morris Adjmi Architects opened, adding 490 residences to the neighborhood.

== Hotels ==
The Water Street neighborhood contains the Tampa EDITION hotel and residence, the Tampa JW Marriott, the Tampa Marriott and ROOST Tampa. The Tampa EDITION was designed by architect Morris Adjmi and has 172 guest rooms, 38 residences. The JW Marriott opened in the Water Street neighborhood in 2020, making it the 100th hotel built by JW Marriott.

== Public art and installations ==
The Water Street neighborhood features installments of public art including LED sculptures, murals, water fountains, green spaces and digital art. The first installation of public art is titled the "Three Arcs" designed with programmable LEDs by Jim Cambol. An overhead footbridge which connects the JW Marriott and the Water Street Marriott hotel will use digital projection technology to react to the footsteps back and forth called "Halocline Sky" by London artist Jason Bruges. In 2022, Water Street hosted British contemporary artist Lucy Sparrow's "Tampa Fresh Foods" featuring 50,000 grocery items made of felt. Sparrow's Tampa Fresh Foods art installation was up from January 20, 2022 to February 20, 2022 and sponsored by the Vinik Family Foundation and Art Production Fund.
