= Cooper Carry =

U.S.-based design firm

Cooper Carry is a U.S.-based design firm providing architecture, planning, landscape architecture, interior design and environmental graphic design. The company is based in Atlanta with offices in Alexandria, Virginia and New York City.

Cooper Carry was founded in Atlanta in 1960 by Jerry Cooper and Walter Carry. The company specializes in design for corporate, office, hospitality, retail, education, science and technology, government and mixed-use projects. The firm is known for its part in the redevelopment of Mizner Park in Boca Raton, Florida, the former site of a decaying shopping mall in the city's commercial core. The Mizner Park greyfield redevelopment, a public-driven project completed in the late 1990s, is largely celebrated as an early case study of new urbanism and mixed-use development. Since then, the firm has worked on the revitalization of Raleigh, North Carolina's downtown Fayetteville Street, Bethesda Row in Bethesda, Maryland, and various other project types.

== Notable Projects Designed by Cooper Carry ==
- Washington Marriott Marquis
- Mizner Park, Boca Raton, Florida
- SunTrust Financial Centre, Tampa, Florida
- Lancaster County Convention Center, Lancaster, Pennsylvania
- RBC Plaza, Raleigh, North Carolina
- Hilton Cleveland Downtown Hotel, Cleveland, Ohio 2016
- Fredericksburg Academy The Hazel Family Arts and Sciences Building, Fredericksburg, Virginia
