= Hotel Flor Tampa =

- Hotel Flor Tampa Downtown, Tapestry Collection by Hilton
- U.S. National Register of Historic Places
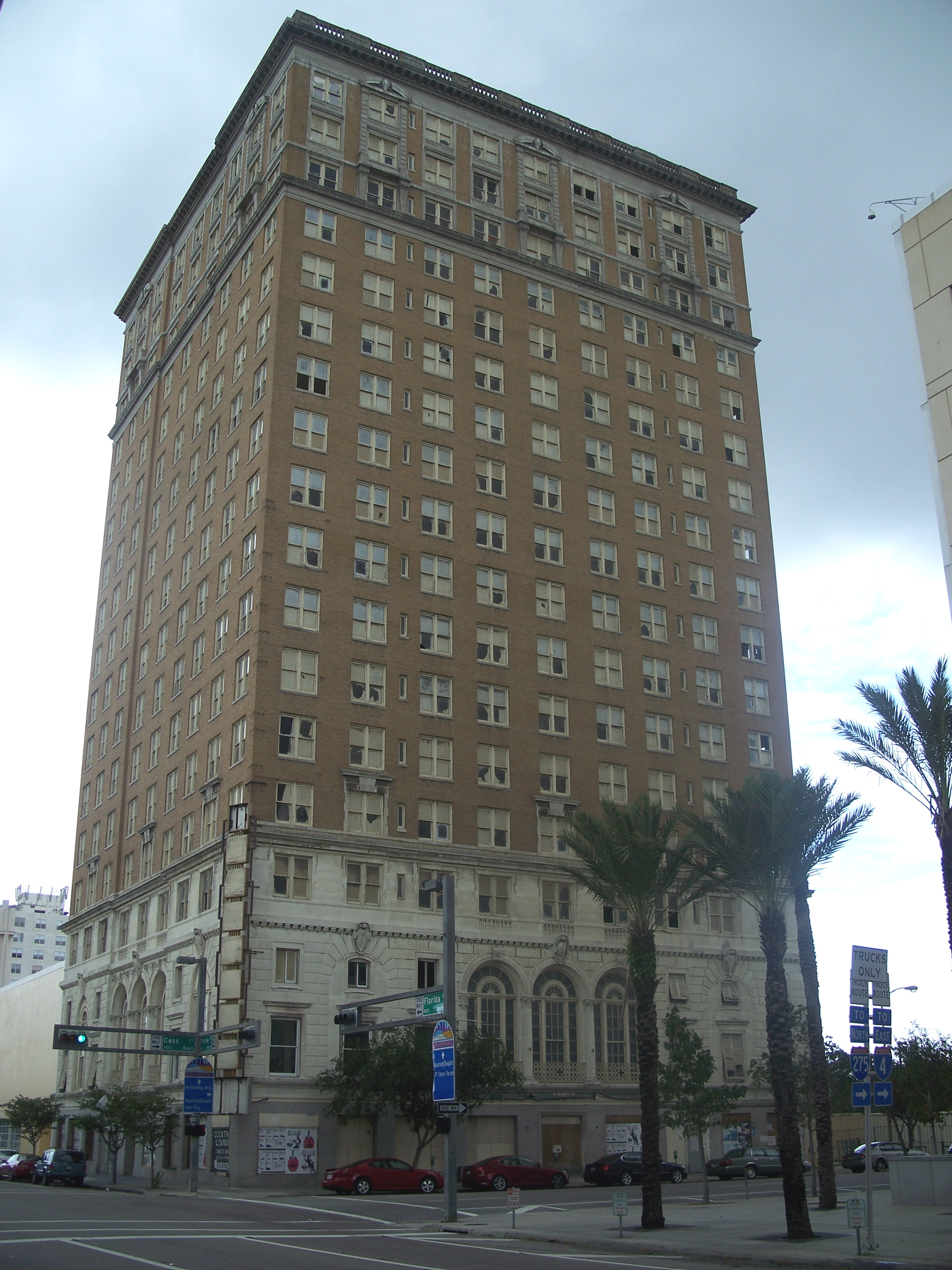
- Front of the Hotel Flor Tampa Downtown, Tapestry Collection by Hilton

- Location within Florida Location within the United States
- Location: 905 N. Florida Ave., Tampa, Florida
- Coordinates: 27°57′6″N 82°26′54″W
- Area: less than one acre
- Built: 1926-1927
- Architect: G.A. Miller and Francis J. Kennard
- NRHP reference No.: 96000315
- Added to NRHP: March 12, 1996

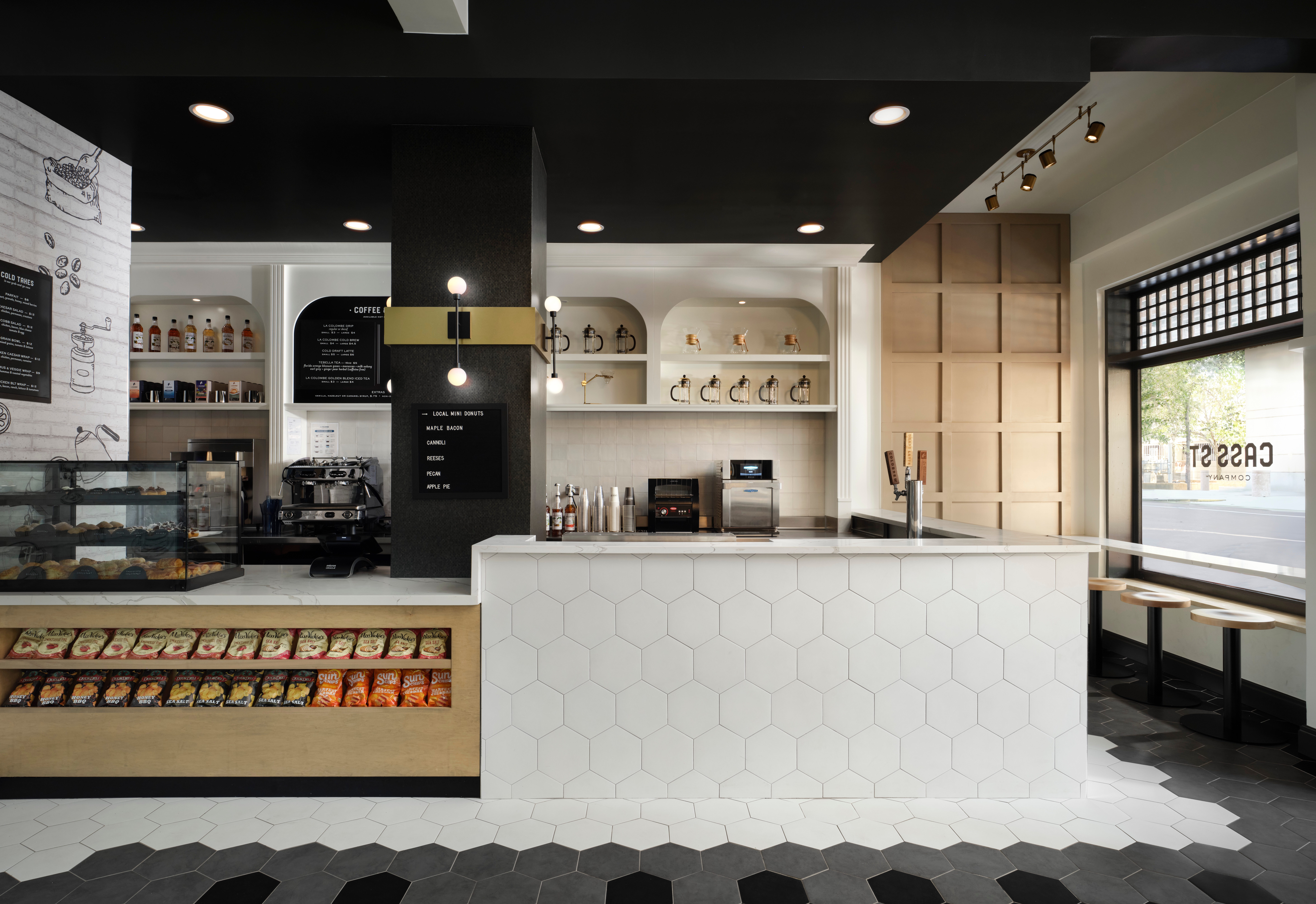
Cass Street Coffee Co. located inside Hotel Flor Tampa Downtown.

The Hotel Flor Tampa Downtown, Tapestry Collection by Hilton, is a historic hotel in Tampa, Florida, opened in 1927 as the Hotel Floridan. It is located at 905 North Florida Avenue in the north end of the downtown core. On March 12, 1996, the Floridan was added to the U.S. National Register of Historic Places.

== History ==
=== Early years ===
Construction of the Hotel Floridan began in 1926. It was designed by prominent Tampa architects G.A. Miller and Francis J. Kennard and was constructed at a cost of $1.9 million. It opened in 1927, with 19 floors and 316 rooms. At the time the Floridan was the tallest building in Tampa and would remain the tallest building in until 1966 when the Franklin Exchange Building was completed.

The hotel's bar, the Sapphire Room, was a popular nightspot during World War II for servicemen who were training at nearby Drew Field to fly B-17s over Europe. Many of the service men at that time were housed in makeshift barracks located underneath the bleachers at the old Florida State Fairgrounds racetrack a few blocks away. The bar's wild reputation at the time earned it the nickname "The Surefire Room".

=== Decline ===
The hotel began to decline in the early 1960s, as more modern "motels" were built along the highways that skirted the city. In 1966, the hotel closed to overnight guests and remained open to long term renters only. By the 1980s, the hotel had become a residence for transients, renting rooms by the week or month. The Floridan Hotel finally closed its doors in 1989, after new owners failed to bring the building up to new firecodes.

=== Restoration ===
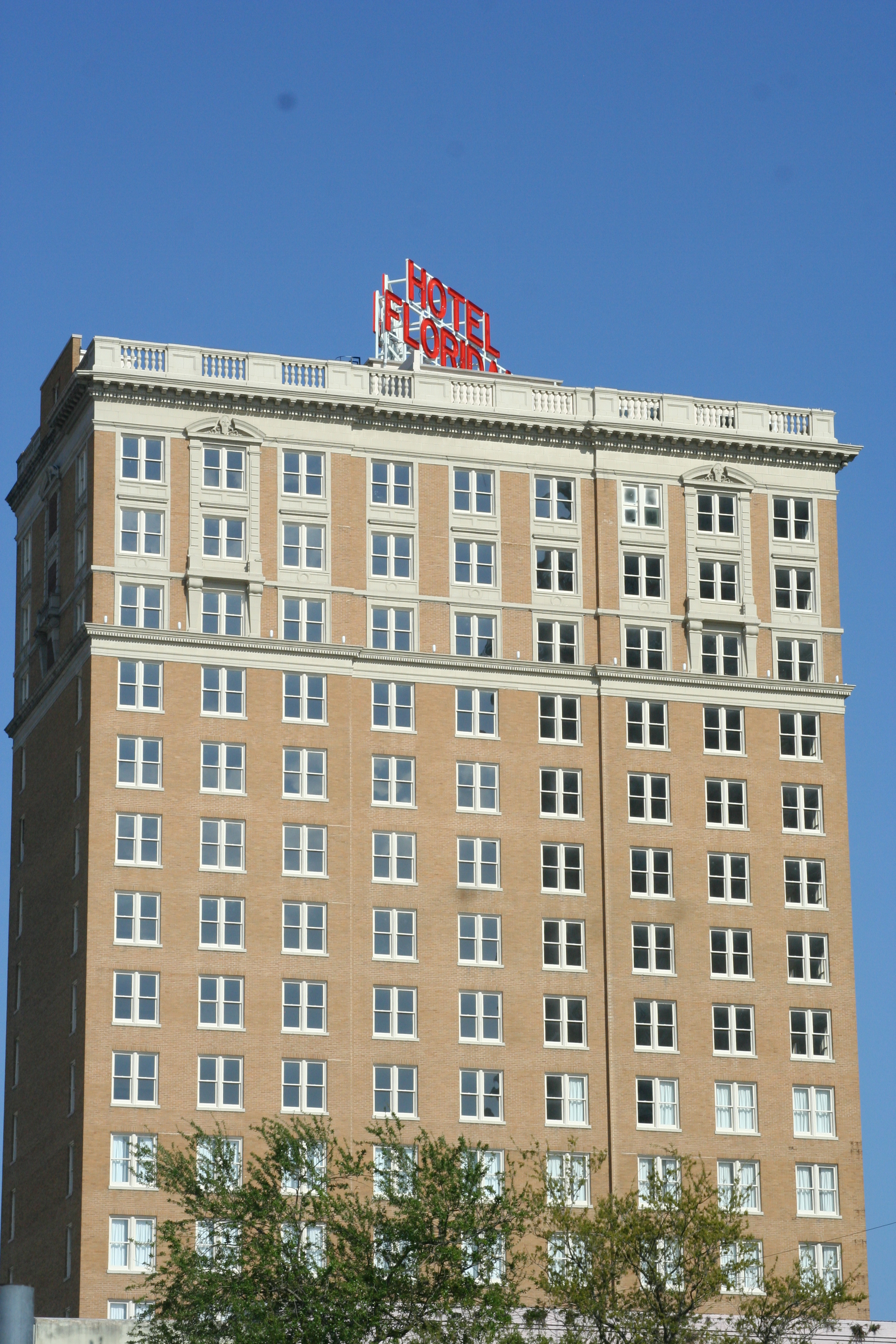
The hotel building in 2012

After a fire in 1987, the building changed owners and remained largely vacant for years. In 1989, businessman Akio Ogawa and Sity International Inc. acquired the property at a foreclosure auction; the hotel closed that year after the new owners did not bring the building into compliance with updated fire-code requirements. The property was listed on the National Register of Historic Places on March 12, 1996. Ogawa and Sity International later sold the building to Capital LLC in 1997.

In 2005, the property was purchased for US$6 million by hotelier and real-estate investor Antonios "Tony" Markopoulos, who began a multi-year restoration of the hotel’s exterior and public interiors. The original rooftop “Floridan” sign was discovered in a rooftop storage space in 2005 and was returned to the roof in 2008 after restoration.

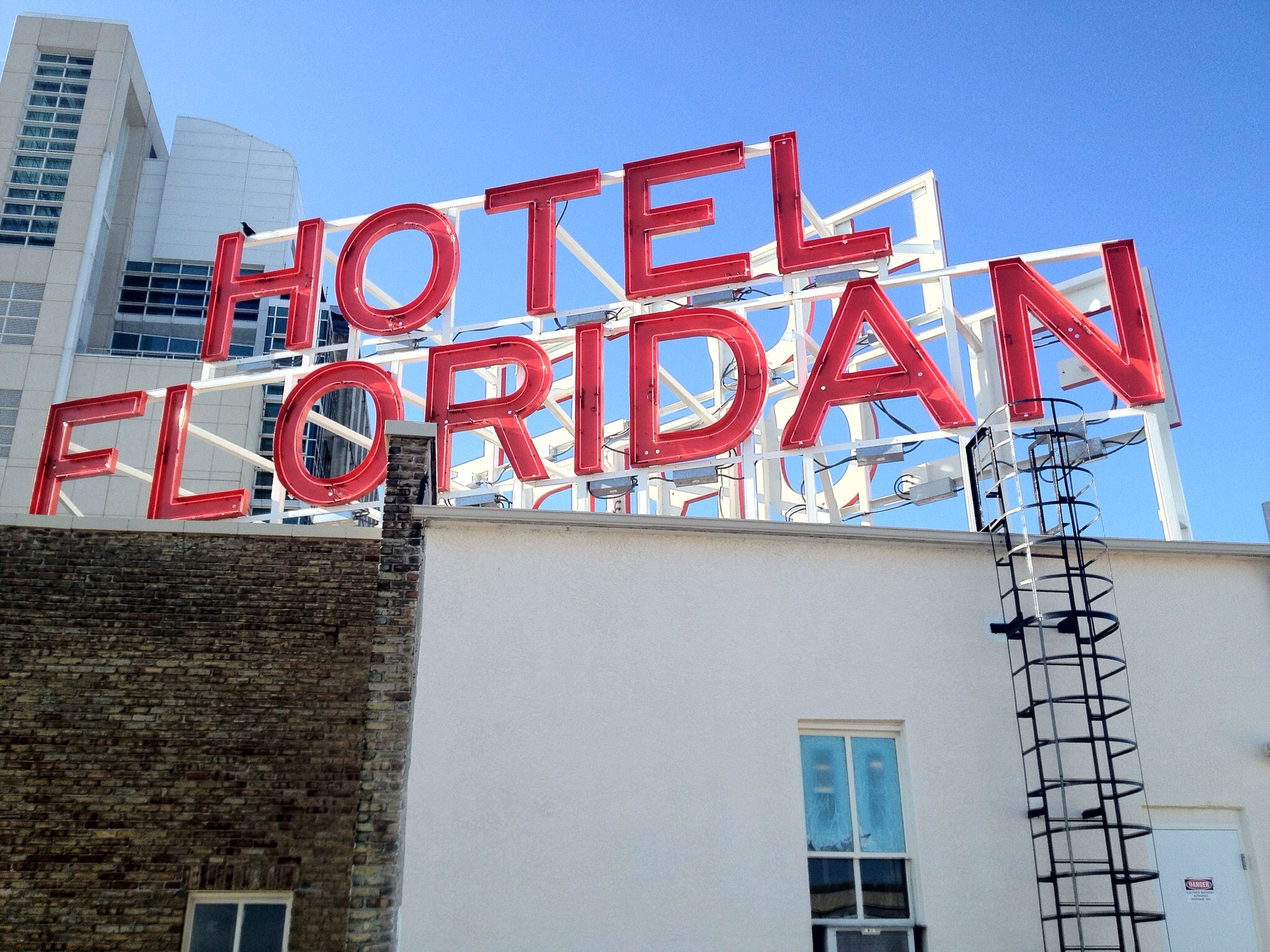
The restored rooftop sign

Ahead of reopening, many smaller rooms were combined and reconfigured; the reopened hotel contained 213 guest rooms, including 15 junior suites and three penthouse suites, compared with more than 400 rooms in earlier periods. The renovation restored a number of original lobby features, including the front desk, staircases, and railings. The hotel reopened on July 30, 2012 as the Floridan Palace Hotel, following a grand-opening event on July 28, 2012.

In 2022, owner/operator 1754 Properties LLC announced a further renovation and the hotel’s planned affiliation with Hilton’s Tapestry Collection. In January 2024, the property reopened as the Hotel Flor Tampa Downtown, Tapestry Collection by Hilton, while completing a comprehensive renovation budgeted at approximately $25 million; the project included updates to guest rooms and event spaces such as the Crystal Dining Room and the Floridan Ballroom. Under the Hilton affiliation, on-site food-and-beverage outlets have included The Dan (described as inspired by the historic Sapphire Lounge) and Cass Street Coffee.

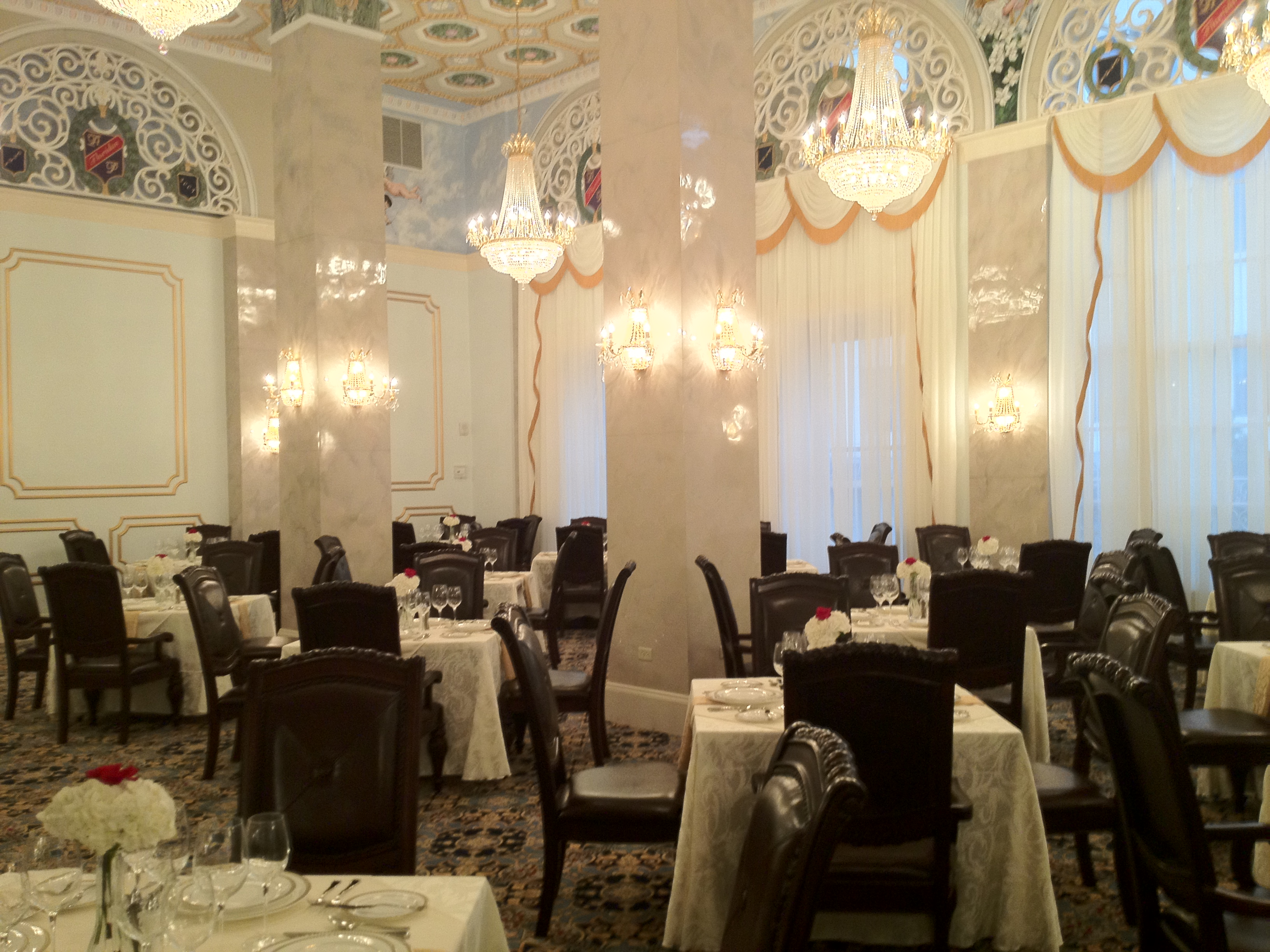
The Crystal Dining Room in 2012

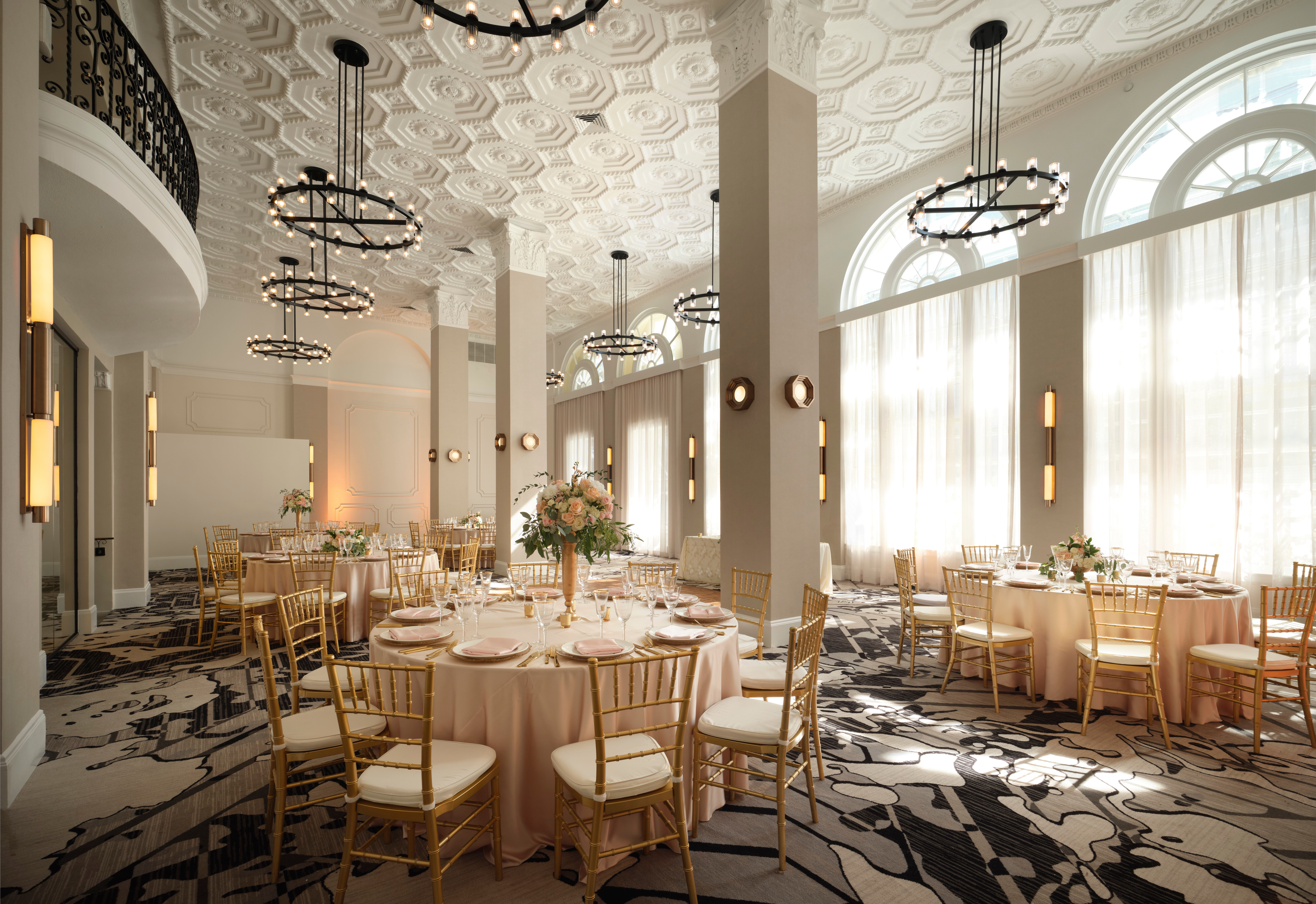
Crystal Ballroom at Hotel Flor Tampa Downtown

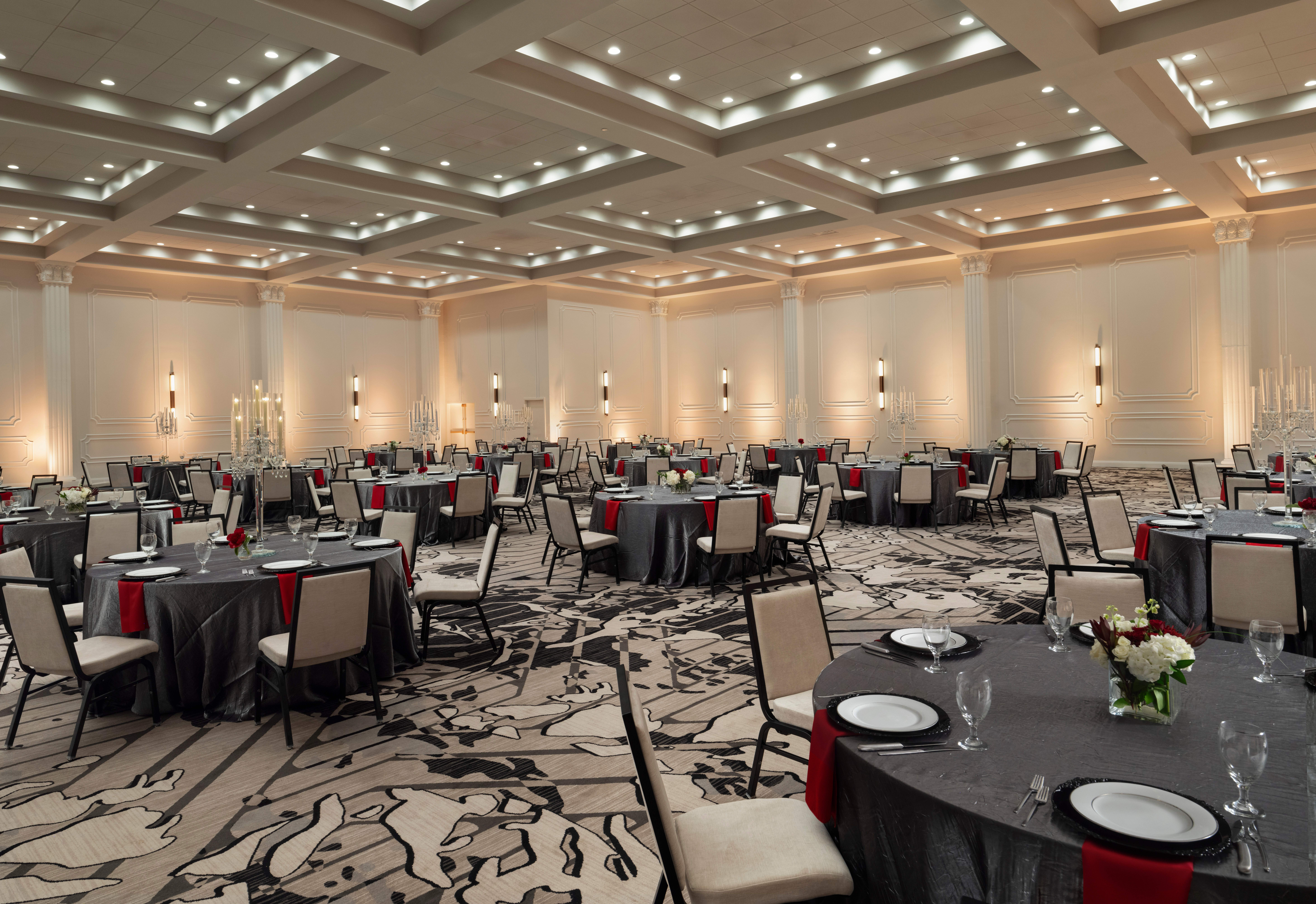
Ballroom at Hotel Flor Tampa Downtown

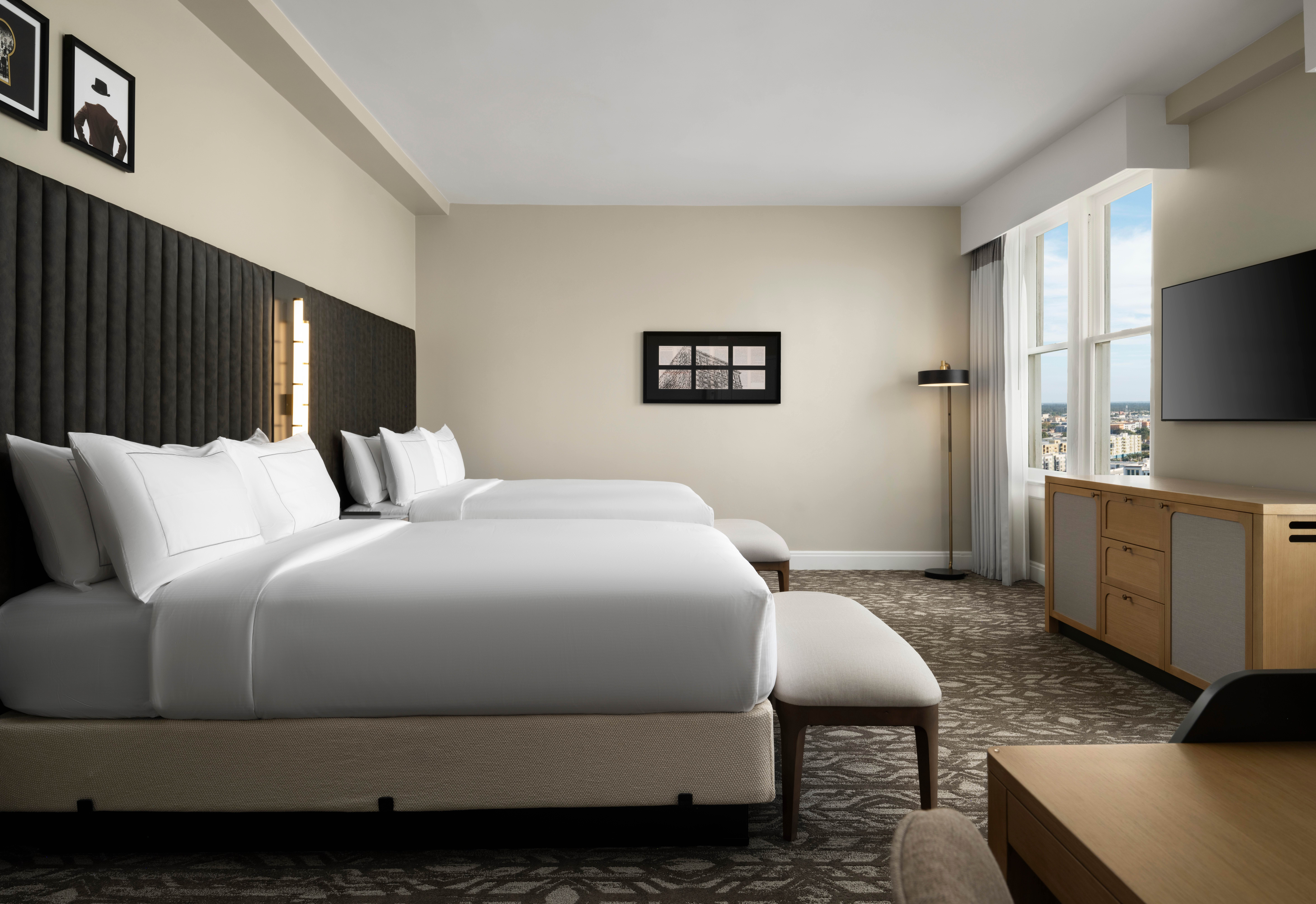
Renovated guest room at Hotel Flor Tampa Downtown

== See also ==
Records
Preceded by Citizens Bank Building	Tallest Building in Tampa; 1926—1966; 62m	Succeeded by Franklin Exchange Building
