= Tampa City Hall =

- U.S. National Register of Historic Places
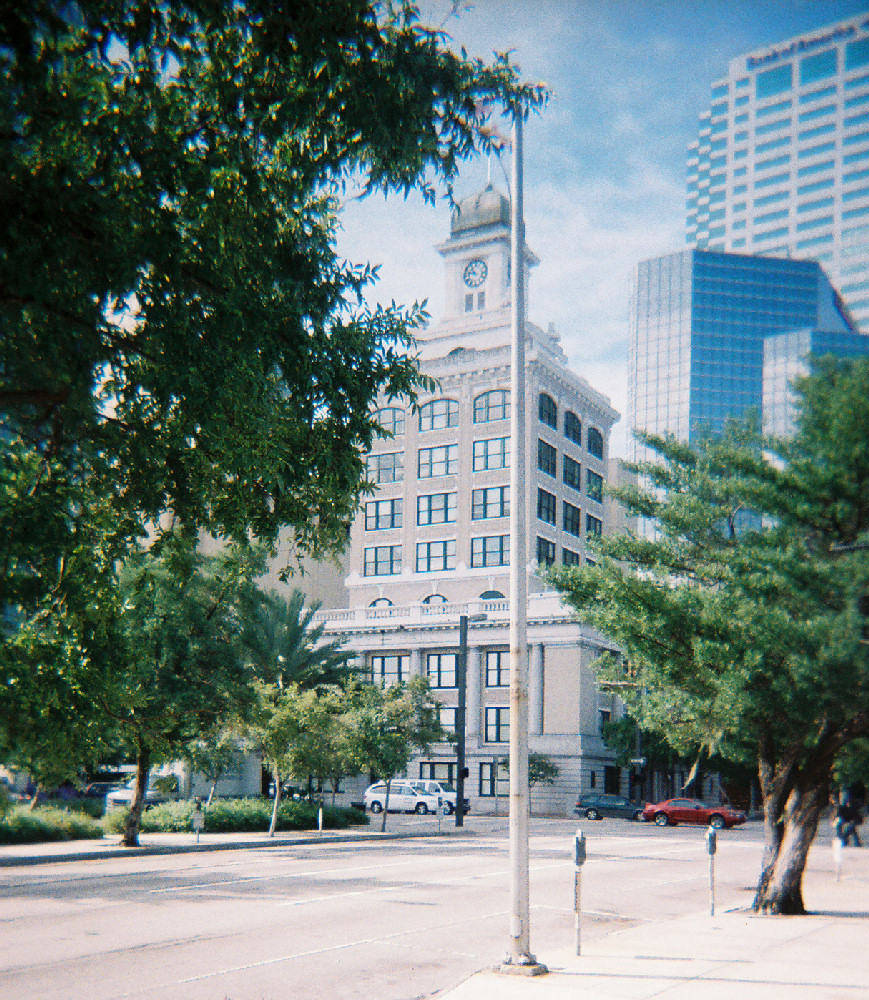
- Old Tampa City Hall, center, surrounded by skyscrapers in downtown Tampa

- Location within Florida Location within the United States
- Location: 315 John F. Kennedy Blvd., E., Tampa, Florida
- Coordinates: 27°56′50″N 82°27′27″W
- Area: less than one acre
- Built: 1915
- Built by: McGucken & Hyer
- Architect: Bonfoey & Elliott
- Architectural style: Renaissance, Beaux Arts, Commercial Style
- NRHP reference No.: 74000639
- Added to NRHP: October 1, 1974

The Tampa City Hall is a historic site in Tampa, Florida, United States. It was designed by Bonfoey & Elliott and is located at 315 East John F. Kennedy Boulevard. It was documented by the Historic American Buildings Survey in 1981. On October 1, 1974, it was added to the U.S. National Register of Historic Places. In 2017, the building underwent a $16 million renovation.

== Gallery ==
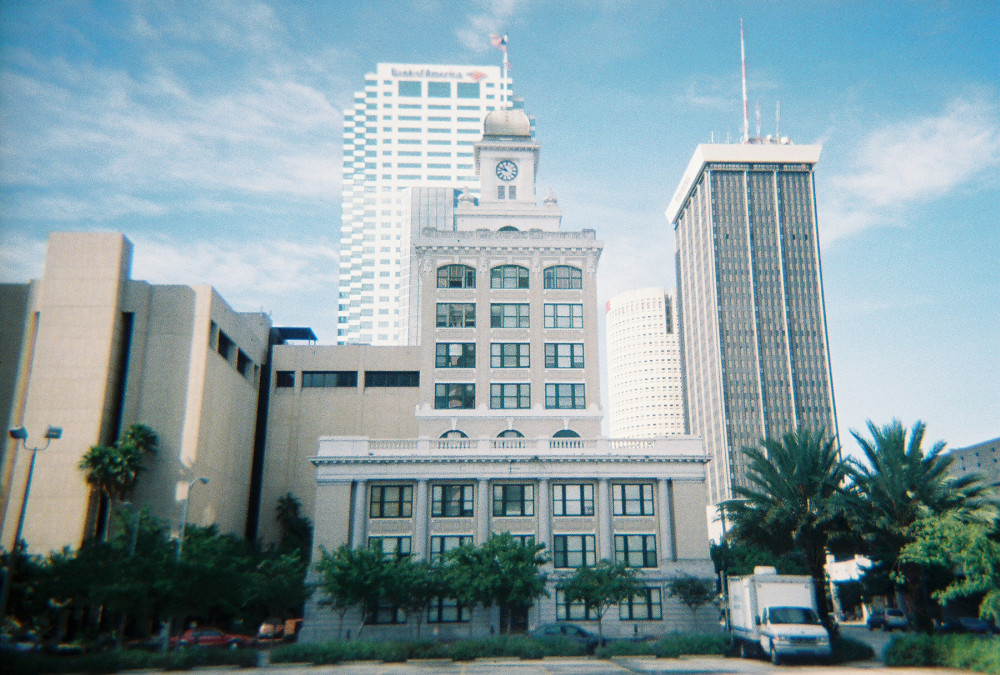

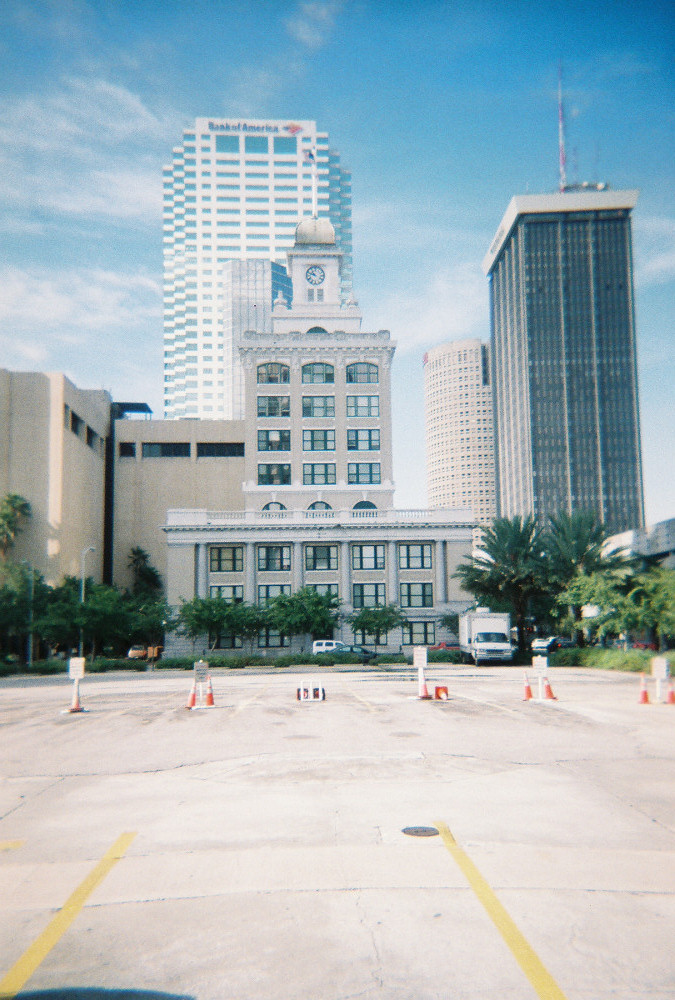

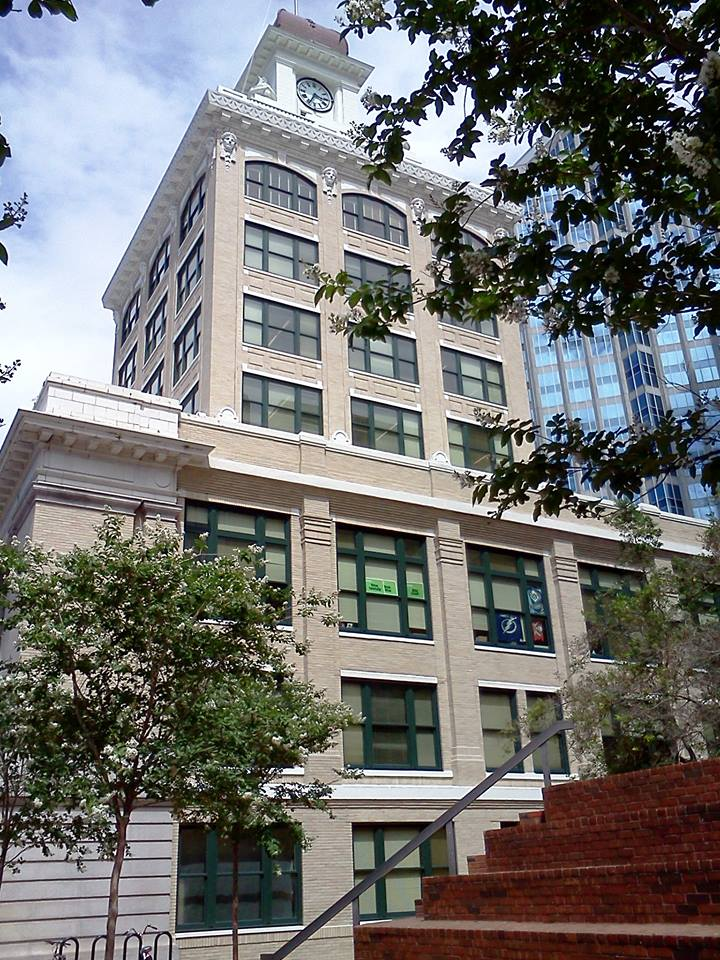

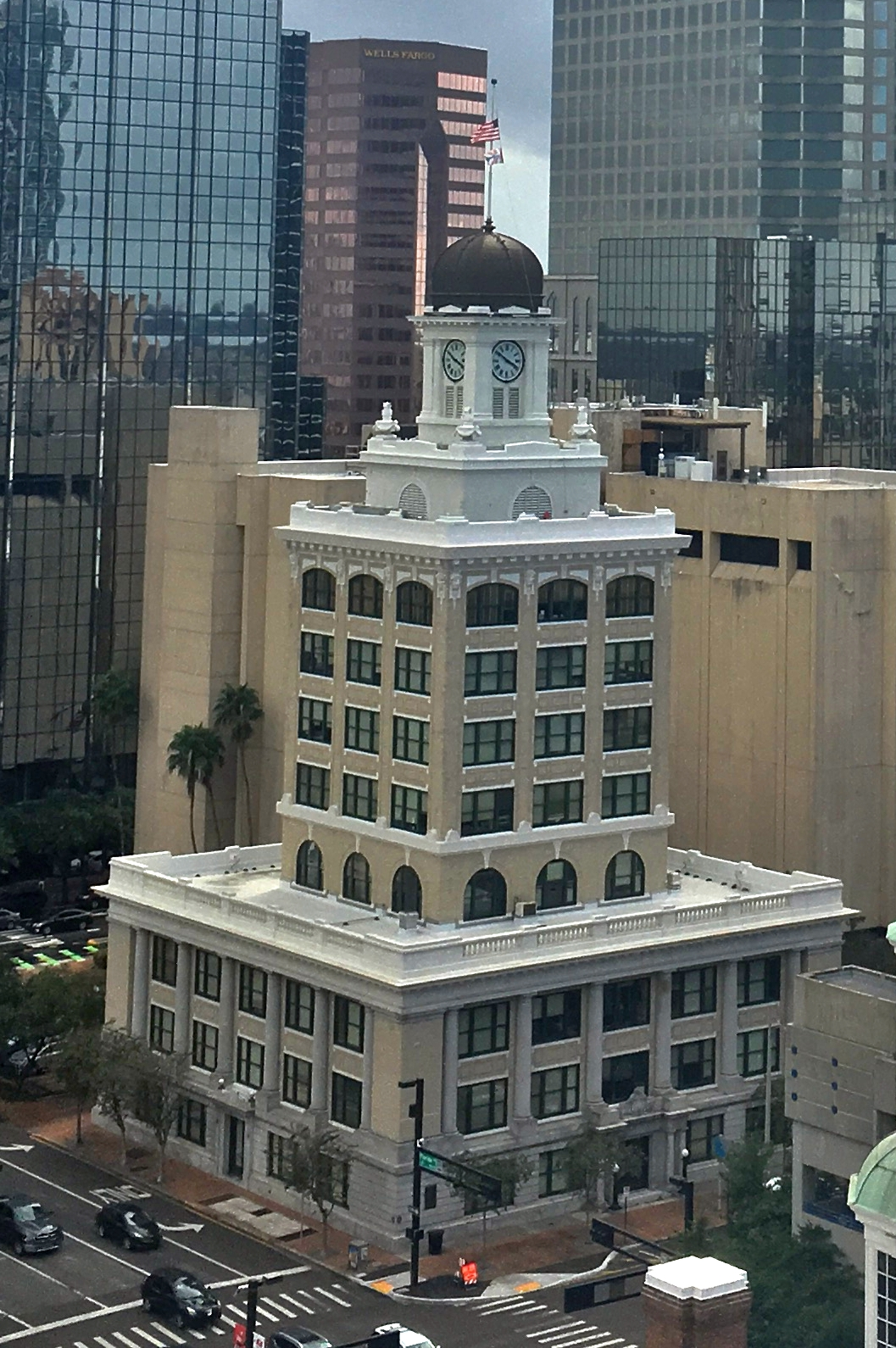

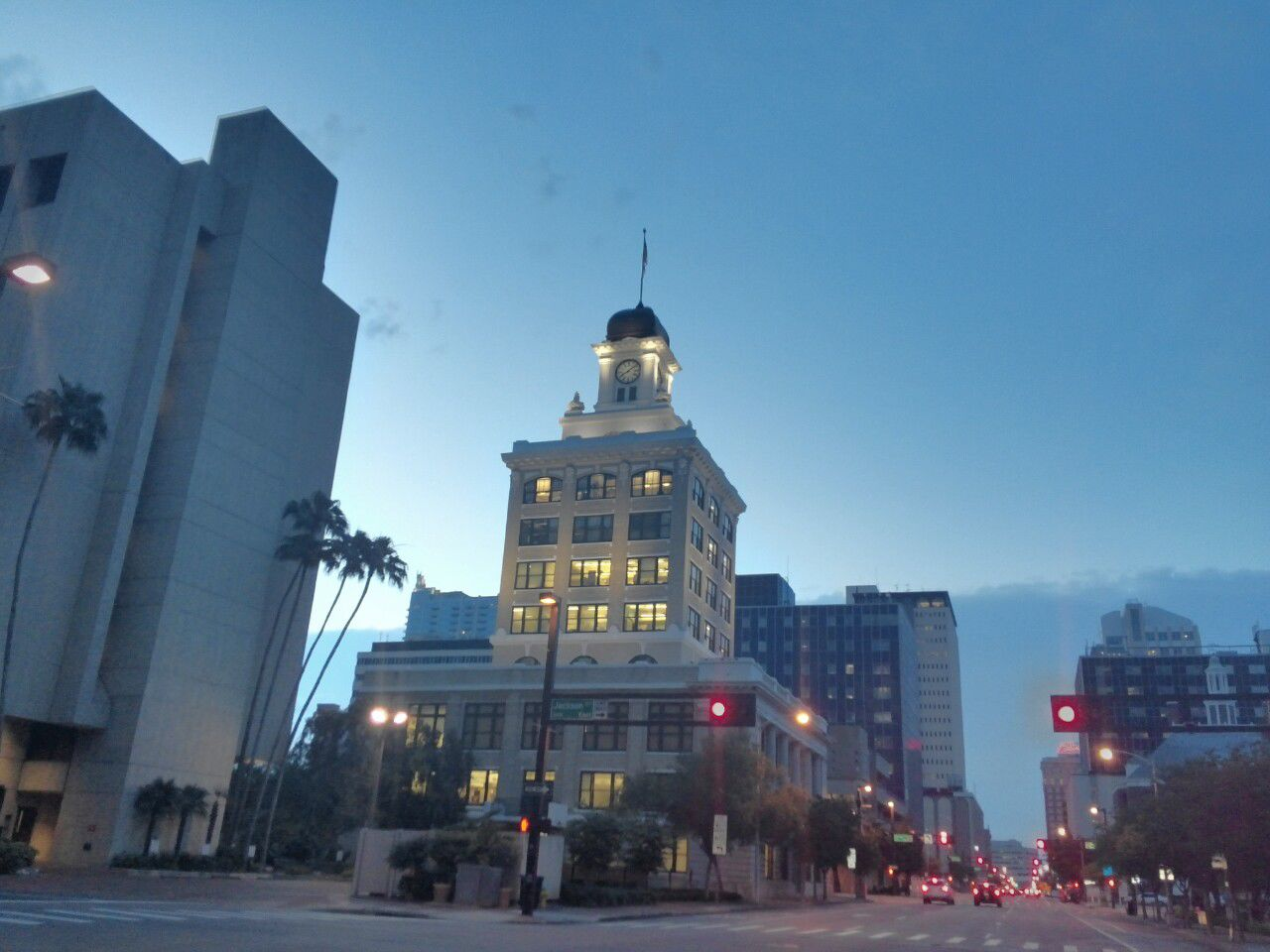

Records
Preceded by Citizens Bank Building	Tallest Building in Tampa; 1915—1925; 49m	Succeeded by Citizens Bank Building
