= SkyPoint =

361 ft (110 m) high rise in Tampa, Florida

- Interactive map of the SkyPoint area

General information
- Type: Residential, Retail, Commercial Parking
- Location: 777 North Ashley Drive, Tampa, Florida
- Coordinates: 27.949880°N 82.460324°W
- Construction started: 2005
- Completed: 2007
- Opening: June 2007
- Operator: First Service Residential

Height
- Roof: 414 ft (126 m)
- Top floor: 32

Technical details
- Floor count: 32
- Lifts/elevators: 4

Design and construction
- Architects: Preston Partnership, LLC
- Developer: Novare Group, Inc./Intown Group, LLC
- Structural engineer: Echelon Engineering, LLC
- Main contractor: RJ Griffin & Company

SkyPoint is a 414 ft (126 m) high rise in Tampa, Florida. It was constructed from 2005 to 2007 and has 32 floors. The Preston Partnership, LLC along with Echelon Engineering, LLC designed the building, which is the 9th tallest building in Tampa. It has 380 Residential units spread across 25 levels sitting atop seven levels of enclosed parking. The ground floor houses 10,800 square feet (1,000 m^{2}) of retail space. Separating the parking levels from the residential is a large amenity deck that houses a 4,000 square feet (370 m^{2}) clubhouse, a 2,500 square feet (230 m^{2}) fitness center, a media room and lounge, as well as a large landscaped terrace and swimming pool. Skypoint is composed of cast-in-place concrete in conjunction with post-tensioned cables. Concrete strengths range from 5,000 pounds per square inch (34,000 kPa) at typical residential floors up to 10,000 pounds per square inch (69,000 kPa) at the ground level columns and shearwalls. Just before its grand opening to residents, William “Wild Bill” Stroup BASE-jumped off the building on March 6, 2007.

== See also ==
- List of tallest buildings in Tampa
- Downtown Tampa
