= One Tampa =

ONE Tampa
- ONE Tampa as of 10/3/2026

General information
- Status: Under construction
- Location: 520 North Tampa Street, Tampa, Florida, United States
- Coordinates: 27°56′55″N 82°27′35″W
- Opening: 2027
- Owner: Kolter Group

Height
- Height: 494 Feet (150 m)

Technical details
- Floor count: 42

Design and construction
- Architect: Adache Group
- Main contractor: Moss Construction

ONE Tampa is a residential skyscraper in Tampa, Florida. At 42 stories, it is currently the fifth tallest building in the city and is the tallest residential building in Tampa, standing at 494 feet (150 m) tall. Construction is ongoing but topped out in 2026, and is expected to be completed in 2027.

== History ==
ONE Tampa's construction broke ground in July 2024, with completion expected for 2026. Later, the completion date was pushed back to late 2027. In August 2026, the building topped out.

The building will contain 225 residences, ranging from 1,200 to 4,000 square feet, as well as 5,000 square feet of commercial.

== See also ==
- List of tallest buildings in Tampa
- Downtown Tampa
