= 100 North Tampa =

Skyscraper in Tampa, Florida

Coordinates: 27.9454°N 82.4582°W

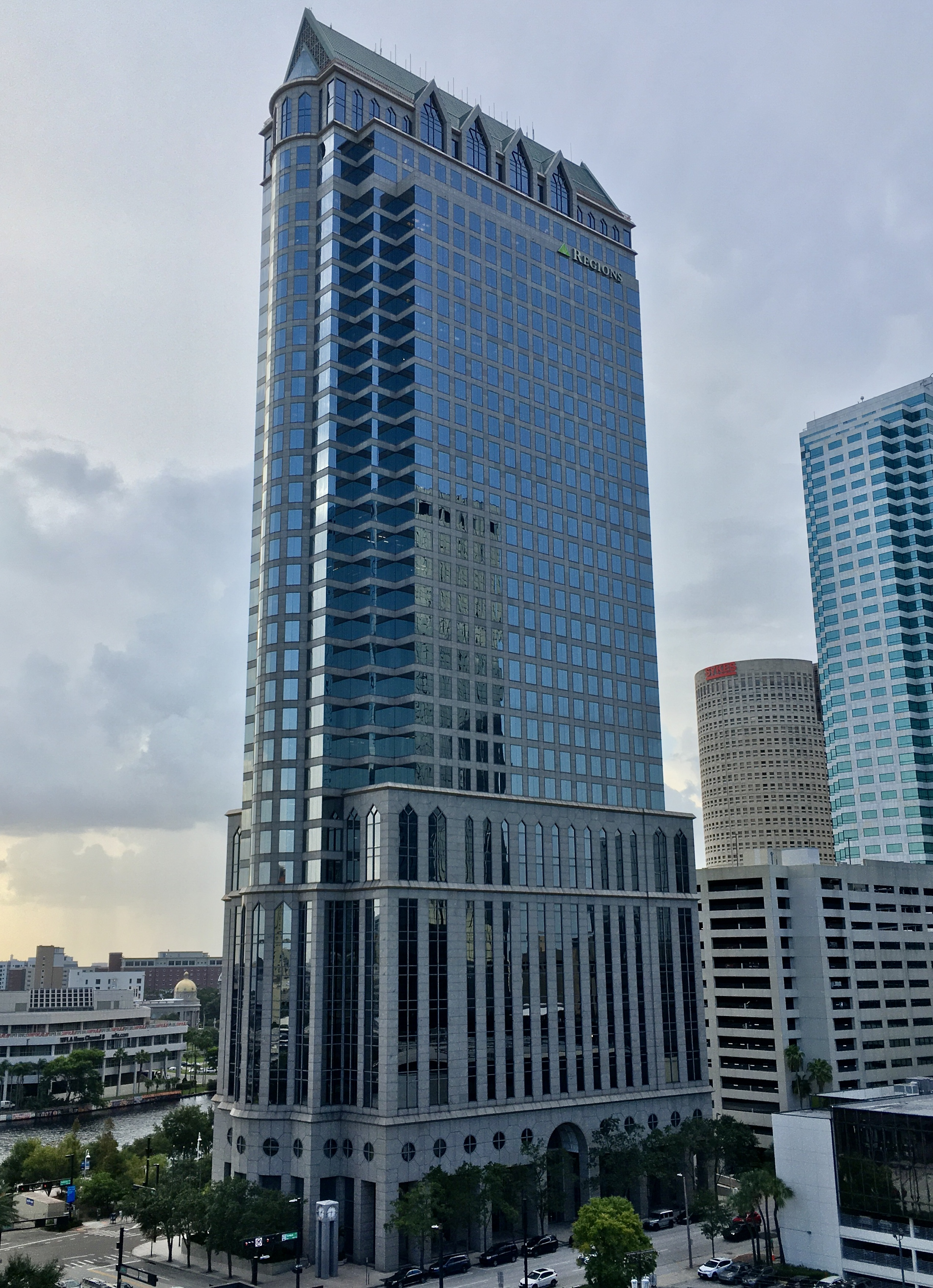
- 100 North Tampa
- Interactive map of the 100 North Tampa area

General information
- Type: Office
- Location: 100 North Tampa Street, Tampa, Florida, United States
- Construction started: 1990
- Completed: 1992
- Opening: 1992
- Cost: US$108 million

Height
- Roof: 579 ft (176 m)

Technical details
- Floor count: 42
- Floor area: 552,080 sq ft (51,290 m^{2})
- Lifts/elevators: 15

Design and construction
- Architect: HKS, Inc.
- Structural engineer: Driggers Engineering Services, Inc.
- Main contractor: Beers Construction

100 North Tampa, formerly known as the Regions Building and the AmSouth Building, is a skyscraper in Tampa, Florida, United States. Rising to a height of 579 feet (176 m) and 42 floors in Downtown Tampa, the structure currently stands as the tallest building in Tampa and the twenty-sixth-tallest building in Florida. 100 North Tampa was designed by the HKS, Inc. architectural firm, headquartered in Dallas, Texas. The building, an example of postmodern architecture, holds offices for Regions Bank, the American International Group, Yara, North America, KPMG, and law firms Holland & Knight, Foley & Lardner, and Turkel, Cuva, & Barrios.

== History ==
100 North Tampa began construction after a groundbreaking ceremony in May 1990, and was completed and opened in June 1992. Civil Engineering and Surveying for the structure was completed by John Herrick, PE, PLS of Greiner Engineering. The building was designed as the Citizens and Southern Bank Plaza, but opened in 1992 as the AmSouth Building after its primary tenant, AmSouth Bancorporation. AmSouth merged with Regions Bank on May 25, 2005, and the building was renamed the Regions Building. However, shortly thereafter, the building's owners adopted its street address as the structure's official name.

The building was originally owned and developed by Plaza IV Associates; American International Group, a member of the ownership group, originally held an interest in the office tower. The building was sold by AIG to the Newark, New Jersey–based Prudential Financial in a record-breaking entity sale that took place in late June 2007. While the full details of the deal, including the final price that 100 North Tampa sold at, were never released, investors estimate that Prudential purchased the building for up to US$275 per 1 square foot (0.1 m^{2}). At this price, the building would have been sold for a final price of $150 million, a record price for a premium, Class A office tower in Tampa. The deal was brokered by the CB Richard Ellis Group.

== Height ==
Rising to a height of 579 feet (176 m), 100 North Tampa stands as the tallest building in Tampa. The 42-story tower also stands as the tallest building in the state of Florida outside Miami and Jacksonville and the tallest structure along Florida's Gulf Coast. 100 North Tampa is overall the ninth-tallest building in Florida.

In 2006, it was announced that a new construction project, Trump Tower Tampa, would surpass 100 North Tampa to become Tampa's tallest building, relegating the former Regions Building to second place in the city's high-rise rank. Trump Tower, which was expected to rise to a height of 593 feet (181 m) and 52 floors, began construction in mid-2006. However, the building's construction was halted in September 2006 when instabilities were found in the construction site's soil. Trump Tower Tampa was ultimately canceled due to lack of buyers in a slowing real estate market.

== Design ==
100 North Tampa is composed of a pewter-tinted glass and Spanish Rosa Dante granite façade. The former AmSouth Building is an example of postmodern architecture; postmodern aspects of the building include its Gothic-style roof, granite cornices, prominent setbacks at the levels of the 38th and 40th floors, and 40-foot (12 m) granite arches at the two entrances.

== Tenants ==
- American International Group
- DLA Piper
- KPMG
- Holland & Knight
- Jones Lang LaSalle
- J.P. Morgan Private Bank
- Morgan Stanley Smith Barney
- Raymond James
- Regions Bank
- Shook, Hardy & Bacon

== Gallery ==
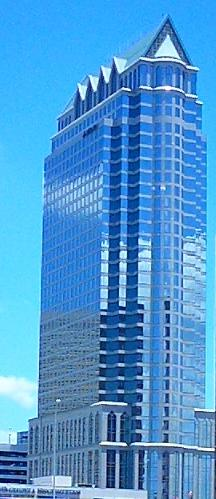
The façade of 100 North Tampa is composed of pewter-tinted glass and Spanish granite.

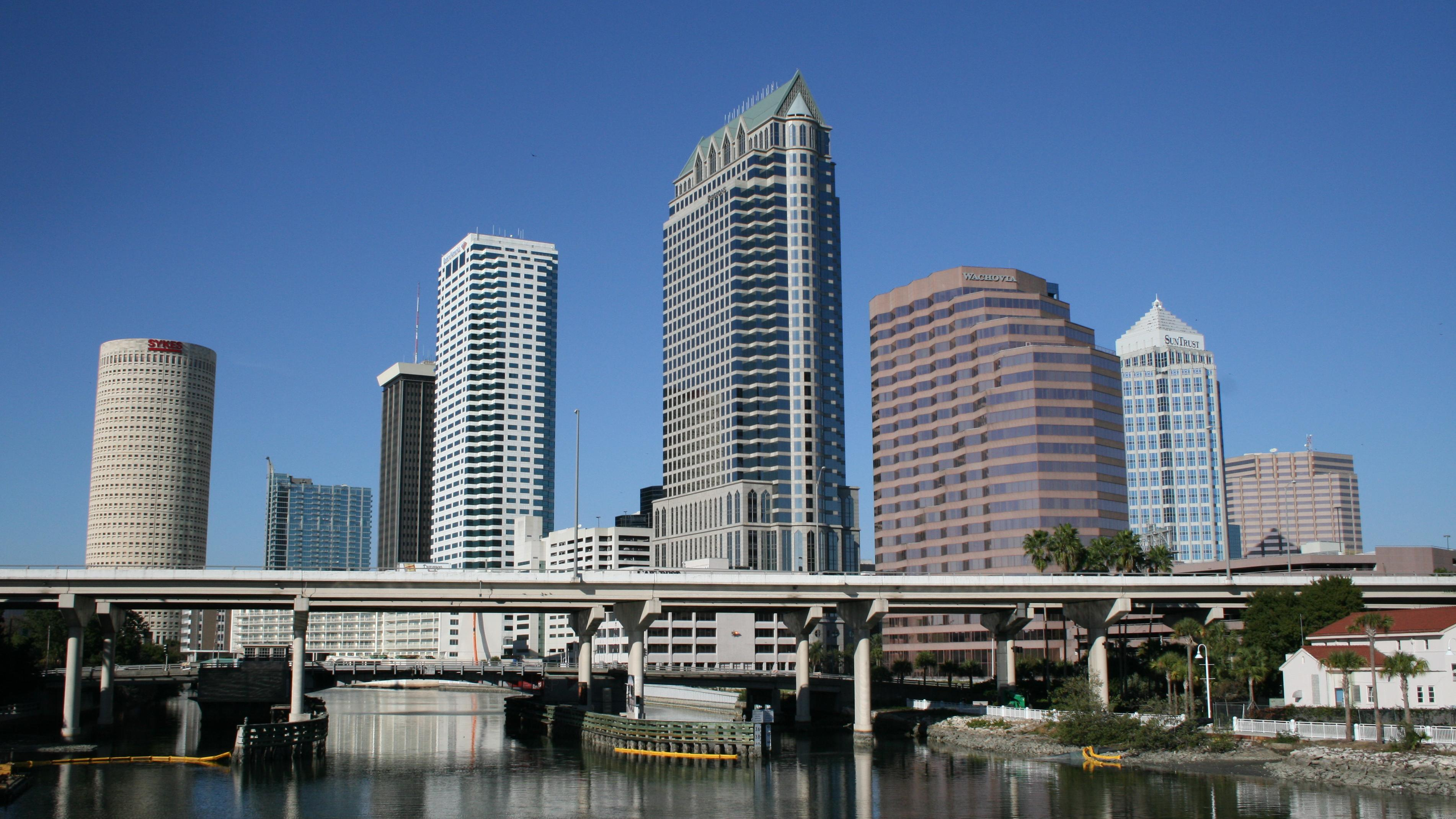
100 North Tampa has a central position in Tampa's skyline.

== See also ==
- List of tallest buildings in Tampa
- Bank of America Tower (Tampa)

Records
Preceded by Bank of America Tower (Tampa)	Tallest Building in Tampa; 1992—Present; 177m	Succeeded by None
