= Citizens Bank Building (Tampa, Florida) =

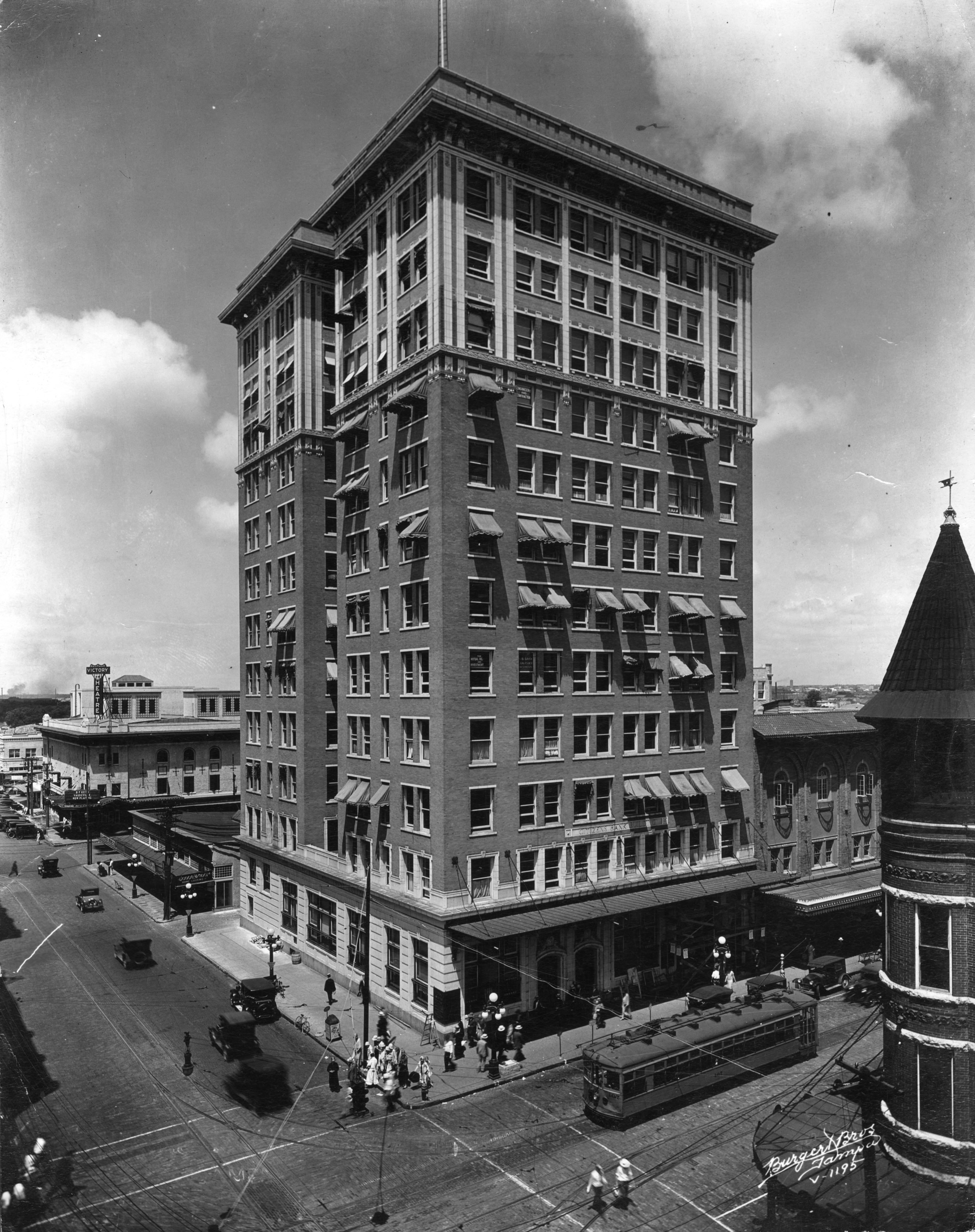
- Citizens Bank Building in 1926

General information
- Status: Demolished
- Construction started: 1912
- Completed: 1913
- Demolished: 1979

Height
- Height: 165 feet (50m)

Technical details
- Floor count: 12

Design and construction
- Architect: Francis J. Kennard

The Citizens Bank Building was a 12-story high-rise located on the northwest corner of North Franklin Street and East Zack Street in Tampa, Florida. The building stood at 165 feet (50m), until it was demolished.

== History ==
=== Construction ===
Construction started in 1912, and was designed by Francis J. Kennard. The building was completed in 1913. The building initially being 10-stories tall, at a height of 145 feet (44m). Construction of the building costed over $600,000.

The building was the first high-rise and tallest building in the city at the time. It continued to be the tallest building in Tampa until the completion of Tampa City Hall in 1915.

The building was originally constructed for Citizens Bank and Trust Company, which was established in 1895. The company and building were boasted as the "big bank" in the "big building".

=== Early years ===
In 1925, two additional floors were added, increasing the height to 165 feet (50m), 20 feet higher than before, and taking back the tallest building in Tampa from the Tampa City Hall. In 1926, the Hotel Flor Tampa, known as the Floridian Hotel at the time, overtook the building as the tallest in Tampa by 65 feet, at 230 feet.

On July 17, 1929, the Citizen’s Bank & Trust Co., which was headquartered in the building, went out of business due to the aftermath of the Florida land boom.

=== Decline and demolition ===
In 1970, the building became vacant, and was vacant until its demolition. In October 1973, the building caught fire and sustained significant damage. This fire made the city of Tampa adopt a required sprinkler code.

In 1979, the Citizen's Bank Building was bought and demolished to construct the TECO Plaza. During the demolition on December 19, 1979, the building collapsed, due to one of the columns collapsed outward instead of inward.

== Past tenants ==
- Citizen's Bank & Trust Company
- Dr. W. H. McCaslan
- Fred J. James
- Gulf Fertilizer Company
- Joseph W. Frazier
- The Thomas Advertising Service
- W. E. Dorchester

== See also ==
- List of tallest buildings in Tampa
- History of Tampa, Florida

Records
Preceded by Florida Brewing Company building	Tallest building in Tampa; 1913–1915 (44m)	Succeeded by Tampa City Hall

Preceded by Tampa City Hall	Tallest building in Tampa; 1925–1926 (50m)	Succeeded by Floridian Hotel
