= Fifth Third Center (Tampa) =

279 ft (85m) high rise in Tampa, Florida

Coordinates: 27.9473°N 82.4583°W

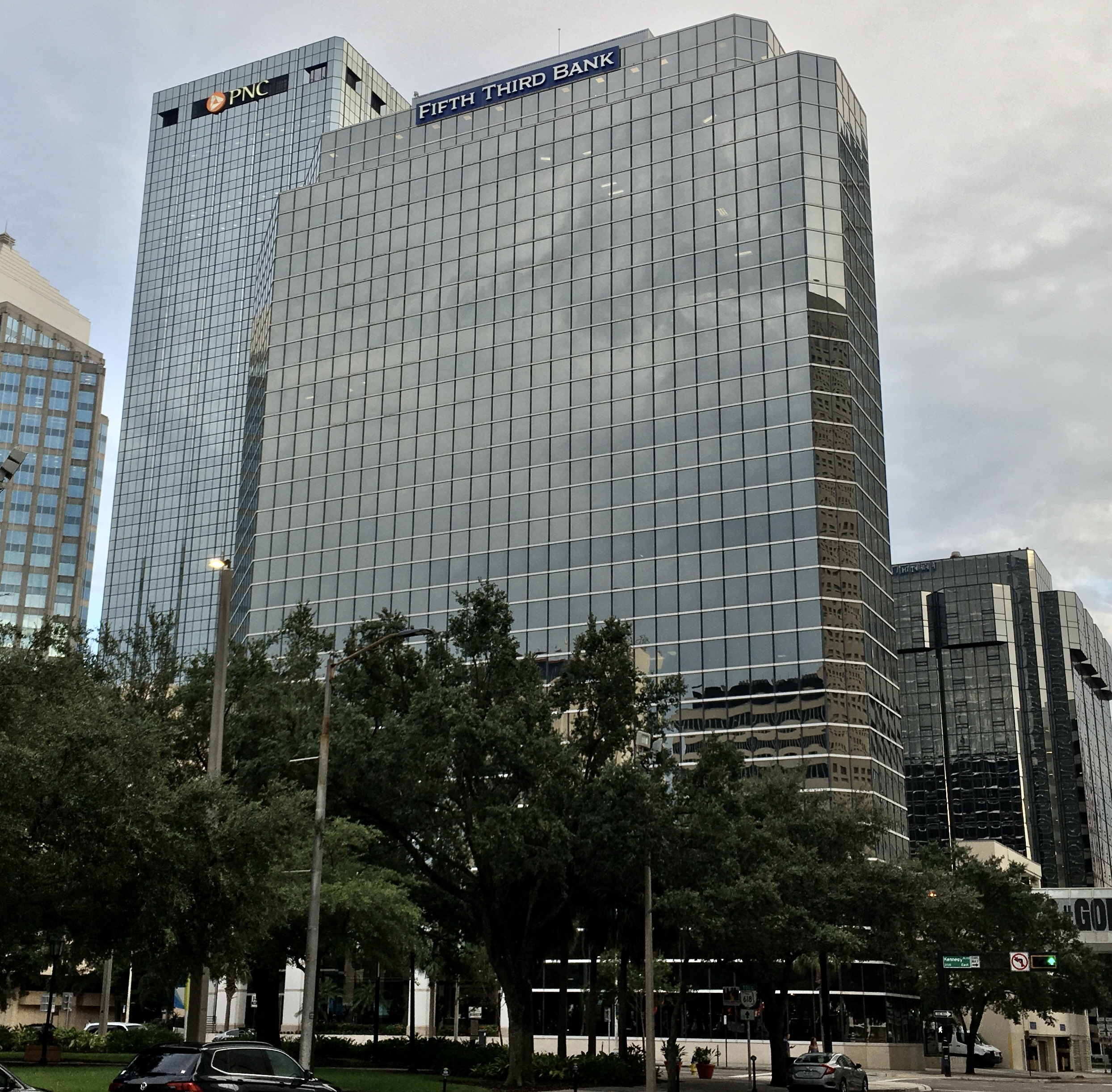
- Fifth Third Center
- Interactive map of the Fifth Third Center area

General information
- Type: Office
- Location: 201 E. Kennedy Boulevard, 33602 Tampa, Florida
- Completed: 1981

Height
- Roof: 279 ft (85 m)

Technical details
- Floor count: 19

Design and construction
- Architect: HKS, Inc.

Fifth Third Center is a 279 ft (85m) high rise in Tampa, Florida. It was completed in 1981 and has 19 floors. HKS, Inc. designed the building, which is the 21st tallest in Tampa. The name of the building was changed to Southtrust Building in June 2005. The building has an attached six story parking garage.

== See also ==
- List of tallest buildings in Tampa
- Downtown Tampa
