= One Tampa City Center =

Office skyscraper in Tampa, Florida

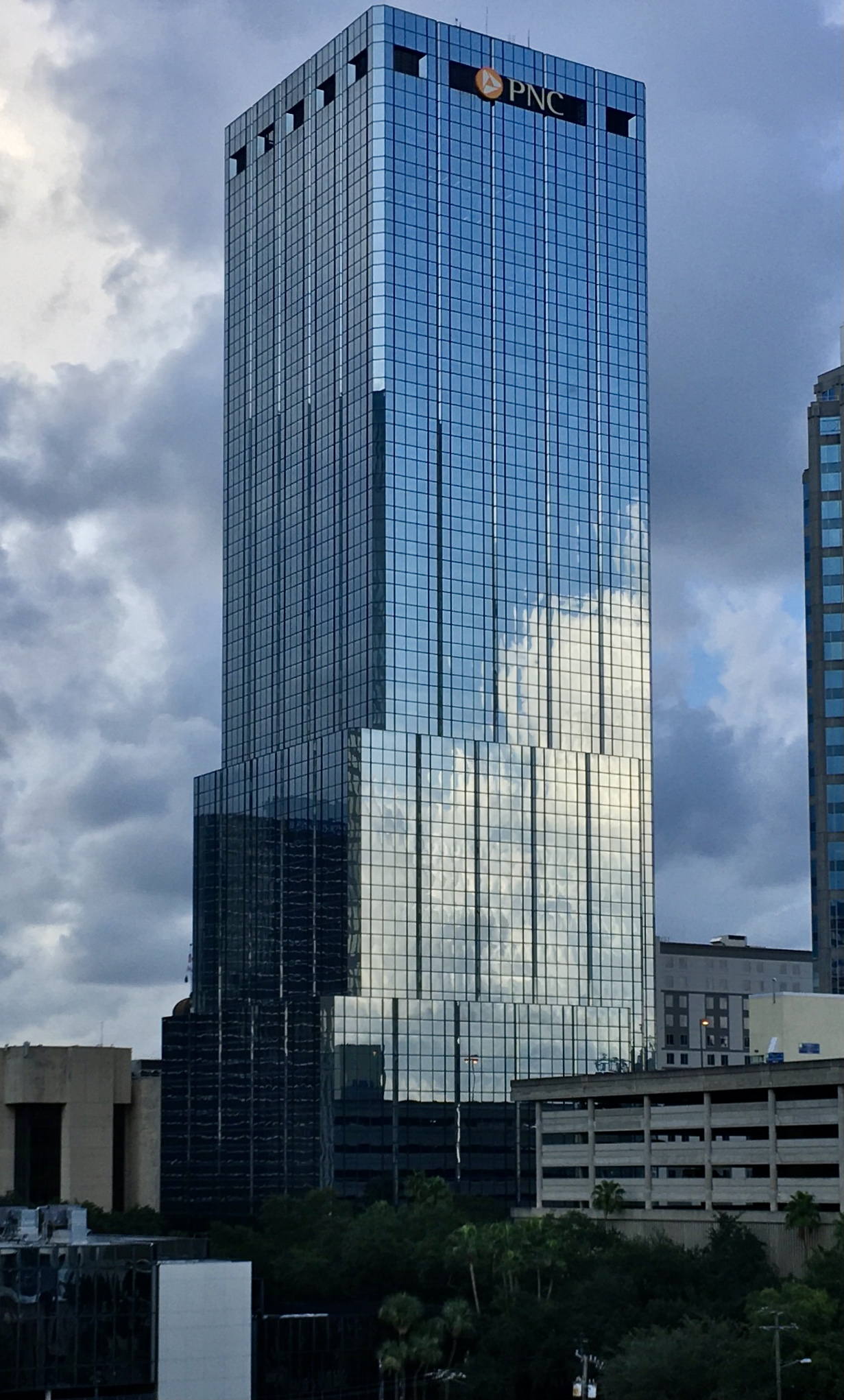
- One Tampa City Center
- Interactive map of the One Tampa City Center area

General information
- Type: Office
- Location: 201 North Franklin Street, Tampa, Florida, United States
- Coordinates: 27°56′49″N 82°27′25″W
- Opening: 1981
- Owner: Alliance Partners

Height
- Roof: 537 ft (164 m)

Technical details
- Floor count: 39
- Floor area: 735,024 sq ft (68,286 m^{2})

Design and construction
- Architect: Welton Becket & Associates
- Structural engineer: Thornton Tomasetti
- Main contractor: Pavarini Construction Southeast, Inc.

One Tampa City Center, formerly known as GTE Center and Verizon Building, is an office skyscraper in Tampa, Florida. It was the tallest building in the state for three years and the tallest building in the city until the completion of the Bank of America tower in 1986. At 39 stories, it is currently the third tallest structure in the city, standing 537 feet (164 m) tall.

== History ==
One Tampa City Center opened in 1981 as the GTE Building. It was the second skyscraper built in the city, after the Park Tower just a few blocks away.

On November 13, 2012, PNC Bank acquired the naming rights for the building from Verizon Communications, which began effective in May 2013.

On October 30, 2014, the building was sold for $128 million to Alliance Partners HSP. Alliance Partners subsequently split the ownership of the land and the building, selling the building in October 2018 for $110 million to Banyan Street Capital and Oaktree Capital Management. HSBC provided an $84 million acquisition loan for the purchase.

== Height ==
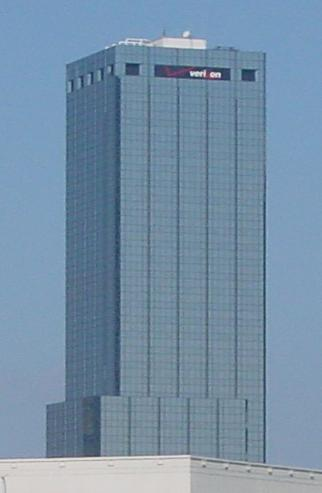
One Tampa City Center is the third-tallest building in Tampa

The building is among Tampa's tallest buildings, as well as among Florida's tallest.

When it topped out in 1981, One Tampa City Center was the tallest building in Florida for four years, from 1981 to 1984, when it was surpassed by the Wachovia Financial Center, which today is the Southeast Financial Center. The building was the tallest in Tampa from 1981 to 1986, until it was surpassed by neighboring office building the Bank of America Plaza. Today, the building remains the third tallest building in the city.

== Tenants ==
The building holds offices for major companies and law firms, including:

- CDW
- Cushman & Wakefield
- Merrill Lynch
- PNC Bank
- Verizon

== See also ==
- List of tallest buildings in Tampa
- Downtown Tampa

Records
Preceded by Park Tower	Tallest Building in Tampa; 1981–1986; 164 m	Succeeded by Bank of America Tower (Tampa)
Preceded by Wells Fargo Center	Tallest Building in Florida; 1981–1984; 163.7 m	Succeeded by Southeast Financial Center
