= Florida Brewing Company building =

Historic brewery building

Florida Brewing Company Building
- Interactive map of the Florida Brewing Company Building area

General information
- Location: 1234 E 5th Ave, Tampa, Florida, United States
- Coordinates: 27.959°N 82.44594°W

The Florida Brewing Company building is a historic brewery building that once housed Ybor City Brewing Company, which became Florida Brewing Company. It has been restored and converted into a law office. It is the tallest building in Tampa's Ybor City Historic District.

== History ==
The Florida Brewing Company Building was built to house the Florida Brewing Company, which was founded in 1896 by cigar industrialists Vicente Ybor and Edward Manrara. The brewery building is six stories tall and remains the tallest building in Ybor City.

Florida Brewing Company was the first brewery in the state of Florida. When operational in the late-19th and early-20th centuries, the building housed the leading exporter of beer to Cuba and was a leader in western Florida. After brewing operations ceased, the building was used for a variety of purposes, although it was eventually abandoned and fell into disrepair. Recently, the building was renovated and is now home to several commercial enterprises.

It was built on the Government Spring, which originally supplied water to the military men of Fort Brooke. Florida's Paleo Indians believed the water in the spring to be of a sacred nature. Prior to Anglo settlement, they brought their sick and wounded to bathe in the water with the belief that it would cure their injuries and diseases. Nearly every native tribe respected the spring's holiness and thus would use the land around the spring as a peace zone, where no one would attack. Influenced by these tales and others in Europe, Spanish Conquistadors fell under the belief that there were crystalline fountains of youth hidden in the springs. Juan Ponce de León helped spread these rumors when he and a Spanish Armada set out to find a mythical fountain of youth. Many still believe the spring to have supernatural powers.

In its prime, The Florida Brewing Company produced 80,000 barrels of beer annually. It was the leading exporter of beer to Cuba in the U.S. and the premier brewery on Florida's west coast. Theodore Roosevelt and his Rough Riders visited for a beer in celebration after the Spanish–American War.

The brewery survived the adversities of the Prohibition and the Great Depression. However, the business closed in 1961 as a result of the embargo on Cuba and the opening of rival breweries by Anheuser-Busch and the Joseph Schlitz Brewing Company in Tampa.

== After brewery closing ==
In the years following its closing, the former brewery served several purposes. It was used as a storage place for fresh tobacco in the 1960s and later became a bomb shelter throughout the Cold War. However, it was abandoned for the latter 25 years of the 20th century, and its condition declined. The former brewery became generally considered a detriment to the redevelopment of Ybor City.

== Restoration and current use ==
In 1999, attorney Dale Swope and contractor Joseph Kokolakis purchased the building to restore and convert it into a law firm and office space. The restoration project received a Builders' Choice grand award in adaptive re-use.

== Timeline ==
- 1897 – This year marked the grand opening of The Florida Brewing Company and distribution of the La Tropical line. Locals were invited to celebrate the launch with beer, barbecue and live music.
- 1898 – Teddy Roosevelt and his Rough Riders rode in for some brew before departing for the Spanish–American War.
- 1905 – The brewery combined with Tampa wholesale liquor and Ybor City Ice Works.
- 1906 – A fire, resulting from a lack of water pressure, caused $1,000 worth of damages. The Florida Supreme Court ruled against Tampa Water Works in a $25,000 judgment.
- 1913 – Although another fire caused $10,000 in damages, production was booming and the brewery was the main distributor to 80% of the bars in the area.
- 1915 – The Davis Bill Package, which prohibited the distribution of draft beer in Florida, was passed and caused owners to question further expansion.
- 1918 – The Volstead Act was passed and prohibition throughout the U.S was enacted. The brewery supposedly began serving soft drinks and cereal beverages.
- 1928 – Salvador Martinez Ybor was sentenced to six months in jail for illegally distributing alcoholic beverages.
- 1933 – With the prohibition over, the brewery opened under a new owner, Wilbur Leavine, who renamed the brewery Tampa, Florida Brewery Inc.
- 1936 – To compete with other beers of the time, the brewery introduced FLA 6 Beer. However, this line of ale was dropped within a year because a state law which prohibited advertising for alcoholic content was passed.
- 1949 – The brewery introduced a new cone top can line to increases sales.
- 1950 – Sales doubled and production reached 300 barrels or 5,000 cases a day as a result of the new line of cans, fermenting storage cellars, a warehouse and equipment.
- 1953 – The brewery dropped the coned top can line and opted for a flat top instead.
- 1961 – The brewery closed due to the embargo on Cuba and the opening of the Anheuser-Busch Company. Samuel Greenburg, owner of Brewers and Bottlers Equipment Corporation, bought the brewery.
- 1962 – Greenburg sold the south portion of the brewery to Corral, Wodiska & Company Cigar Manufacturers. The building was used as a storage place for fresh tobacco.
- 1999 – Dale Swope and Joe Kokolakis purchased the dilapidated brewery and renovated the building.
- 2001 – With renovations complete, a number of corporate tenants acquired office space in the building.

Records
| Preceded by Unknown | Tallest Building in Tampa; 1897—1913; 25m | Succeeded by Citizens Bank Building |
