= Wells Fargo Center (Tampa) =

High rise in Tampa, Florida

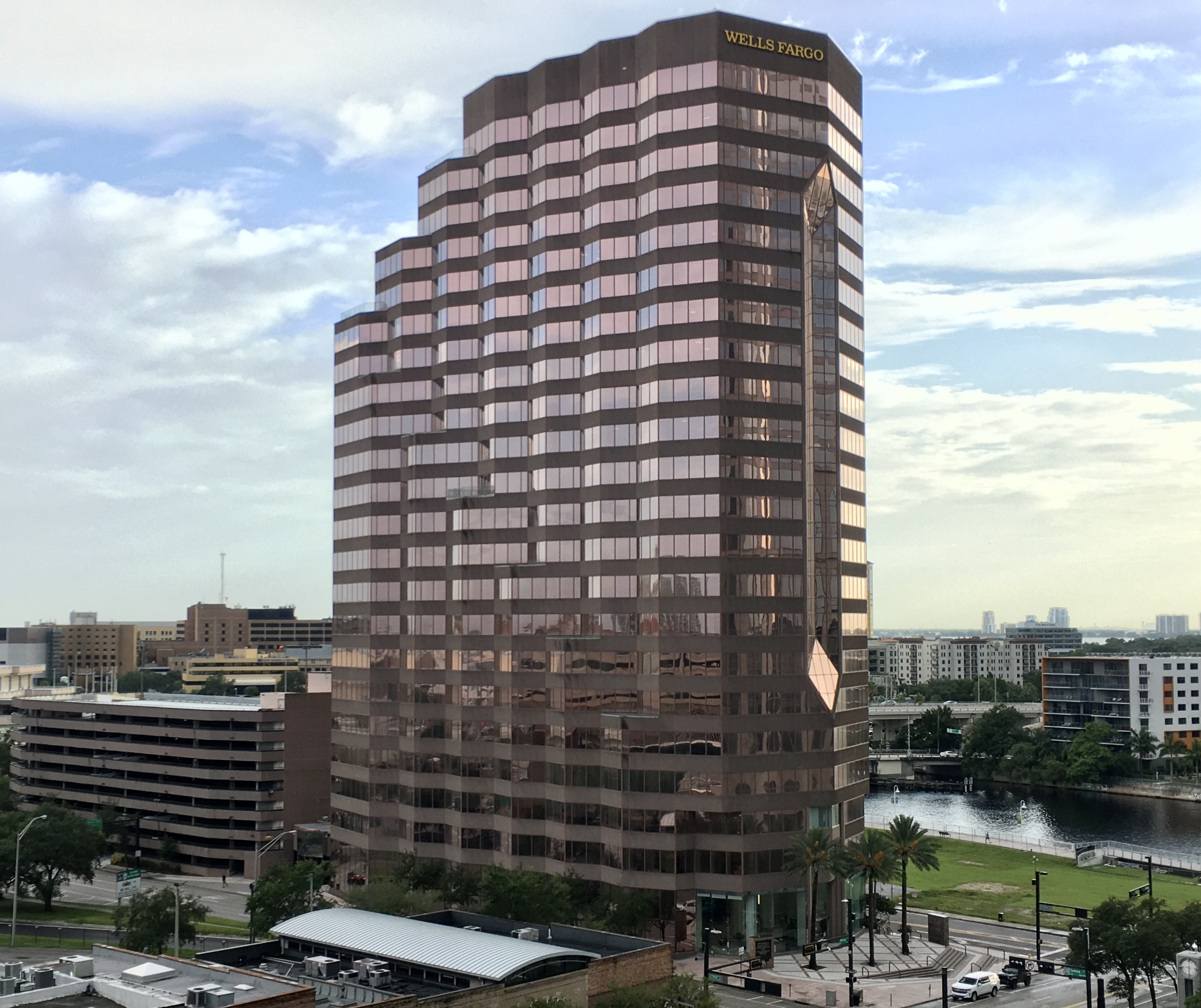
- 387,477 Square Foot Class A Office Building in Downtown Tampa
- Interactive map of the Wells Fargo Center area

General information
- Status: Renovations Underway 2013
- Type: Office
- Location: 100 S. Ashley Drive, Tampa FL 33602
- Coordinates: 27.94467°N 82.45786°W
- Completed: 1985
- Owner: Joint Venture of Feldman Equities, Inc. and Tower Realty Partners
- Management: Tower Realty Partners

Height
- Roof: 311 ft (95 m)

Technical details
- Floor count: 22
- Floor area: 386,995 sq ft (35,953.0 m^{2})

Wells Fargo Center, formerly the Wachovia Center, is a 311-foot (95 m) high rise in Tampa, Florida, U.S.A., anchored by Wells Fargo & Company, Phelps Dunbar and UBS. It was completed in 1985 and has 22 floors. Under new ownership in 2013, the building is undergoing a renovation of the fitness center, parking garage and common areas including the restrooms and corridors. The building received Gold LEED certification in 2010. It was originally known as First Union Plaza until First Union Corporation completed its merger into Wachovia in 1993, then that merged into Wells Fargo in 2008. It is the 13th tallest building in Tampa.

== See also ==
- List of tallest buildings in Tampa
- Downtown Tampa
