= Franklin Exchange Building =

280 ft (85m) high rise in Tampa, Florida

Coordinates: 27.9496°N 82.4584°W

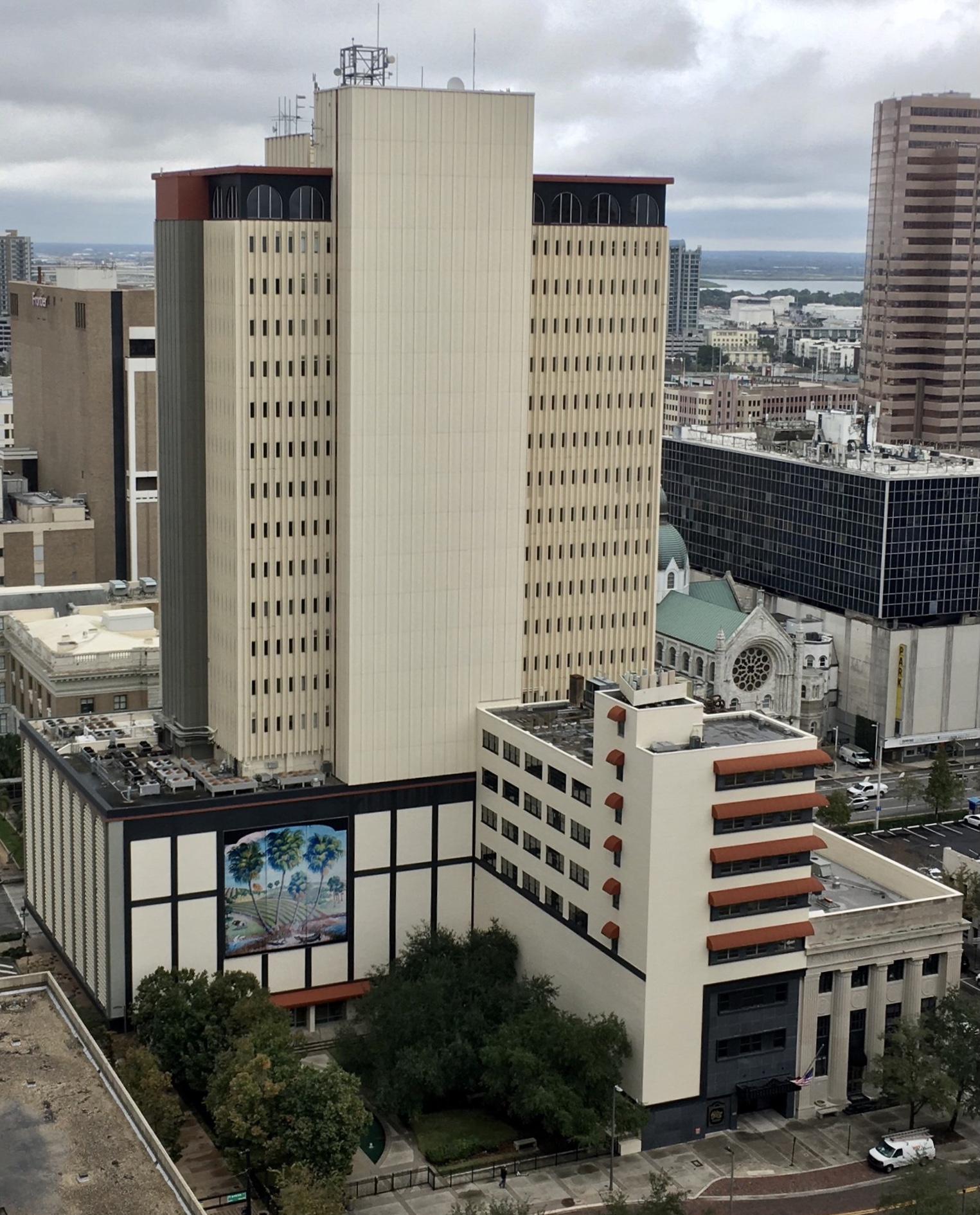
- Interactive map of the Franklin Exchange Building area

General information
- Location: 655 North Franklin Street, Tampa, Florida
- Completed: 1966; 60 years ago

Height
- Roof: 280 ft (85 m)

Technical details
- Floor count: 22

The Franklin Exchange Building, also known as the Exchange National Building, is a 22-story, 280 ft (85m) high rise located in Tampa, Florida. The building is located at 655 North Franklin Street. The complex includes the 22-story tower, 7-story annex, and a 3-story vault.

== History ==
=== Predecessor ===
The original building, the Exchange National Bank, otherwise called the vault, was constructed in 1894, with 2-stories. The building was demolished in 1922, and in 1923 the vault was rebuilt in a neoclassical style. In the 1950s the 7-story annex was constructed in a modern style.

=== Current building ===
The 600 Franklin Street block was bought by The Wilson Company. The tower was constructed in 1966. At the time of its completion, it was the tallest building in Tampa for 6 years, until the Park Tower was constructed in 1972, beating the height by 178 feet. As of April 24, 2025, it is currently the 22nd tallest building in the city.

The vault was renovated in 2013, turning it into an event venue for weddings and art galleries.

== See also ==
- List of tallest buildings in Tampa

Records
Preceded by Floridan Palace Hotel	Tallest Building in Tampa; 1966—1972; 85m	Succeeded by Park Tower
