= Truist Place =

Skyscraper in Tampa, Florida

Coordinates: 27°56′49″N 82°27′22″W

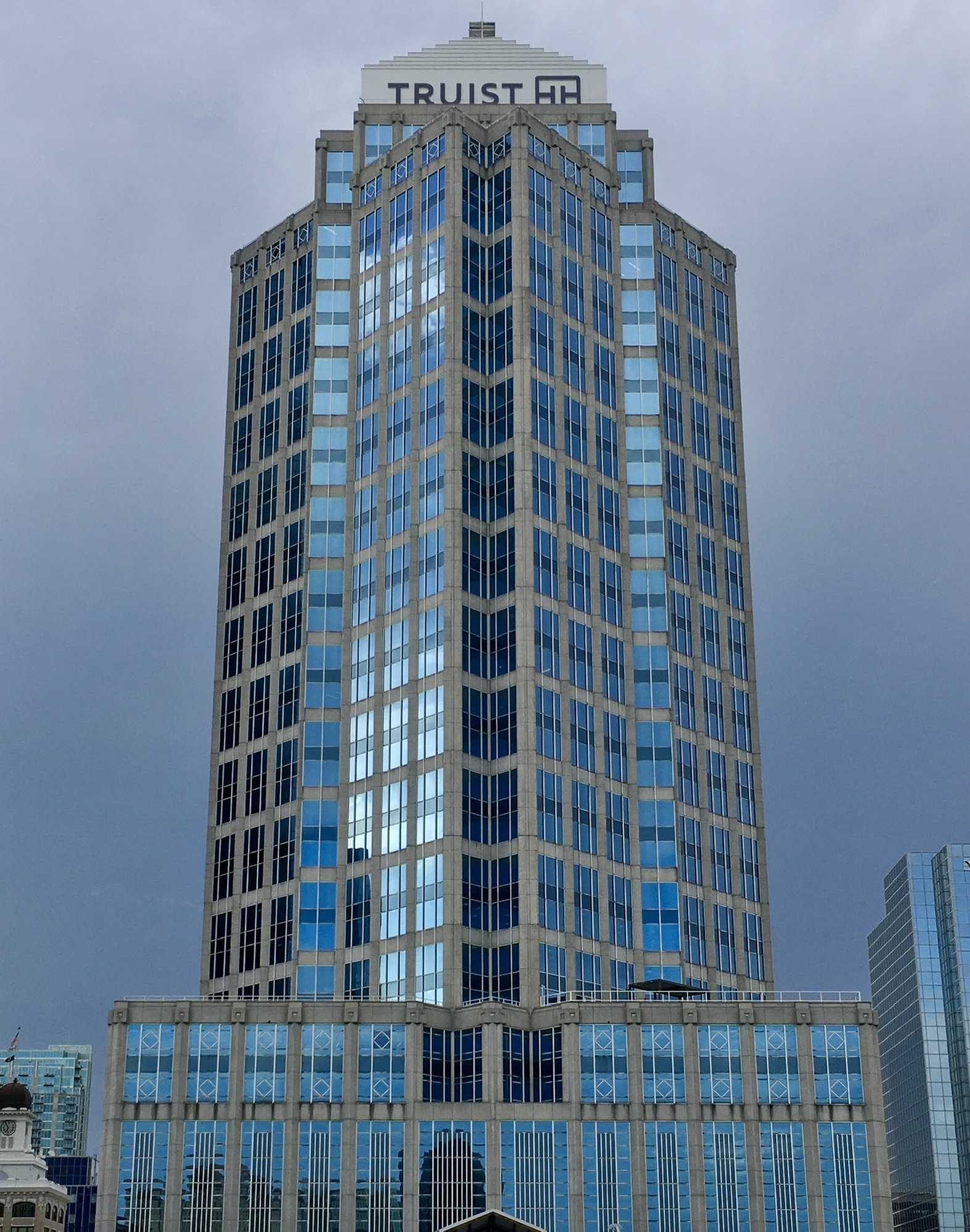
- Truist Place in 2021
- Interactive map of the Truist Place area

General information
- Status: Completed
- Type: Office
- Location: 401 East Jackson Street, Tampa, Florida
- Completed: 1992

Height
- Roof: 525 ft (160 m)

Technical details
- Floor count: 36

Design and construction
- Architect: Cooper Carry
- Main contractor: Hardin Construction Company, LLC

Truist Place, formerly SunTrust Financial Centre, is a 525 ft (160 m) skyscraper in Tampa, Florida. It was completed in 1992 and has 36 floors. Cooper Carry designed the building, which is the 4th tallest in Tampa. It was designed to take a 110 miles per hour (180 km/h) wind load.

The iconic pyramid roof has variable lighting set to the season or events.

As part of SunTrust's merger with BB&T to become Truist, the name of the building was changed to Truist Place in January 2021.

== See also ==
- List of tallest buildings in Tampa
