= Tampa Marriott Waterside =

Tampa Marriott Water Street
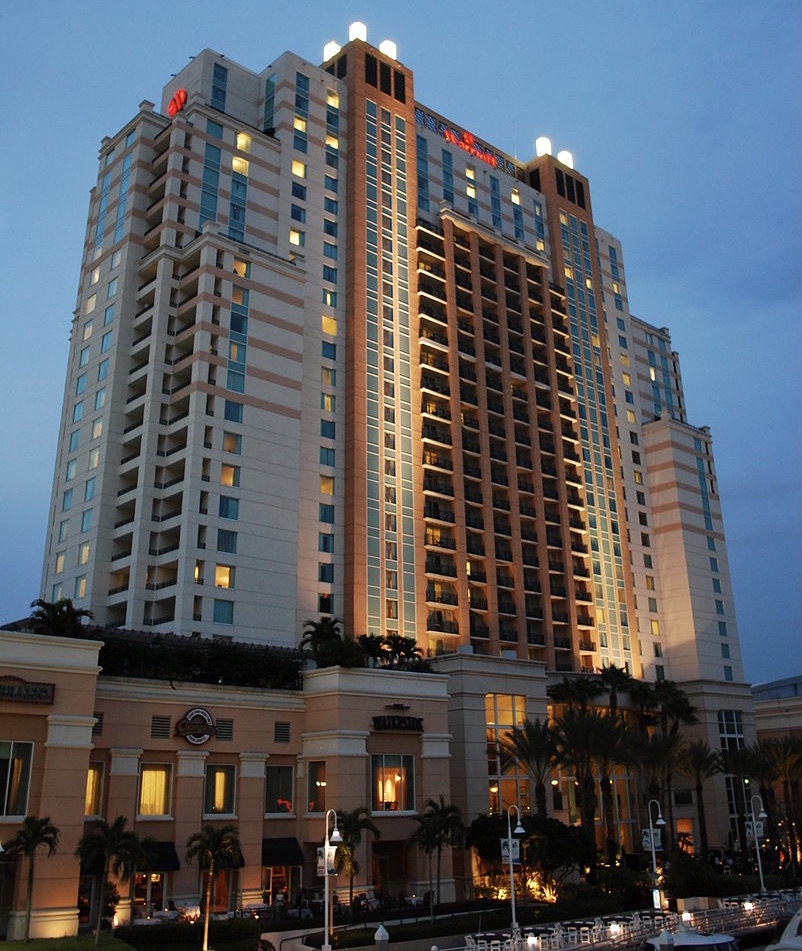
- Interactive map of the Tampa Marriott Water Street area

General information
- Type: Hotel
- Location: 700 South Florida Avenue, Tampa, Florida
- Coordinates: 27.941°N 82.454°W
- Completed: 2000

Height
- Roof: 326 ft (99 m)

Technical details
- Floor count: 27

Tampa Marriott Water Street is a 326-foot (99 m) high rise hotel in Tampa, Florida near the Tampa Convention Center It was completed in 2000 and has 27 floors with 727 rooms and 50,000 square feet (4,600 m^{2}) of meeting space. It is the city's largest hotel and the 13th tallest building in Tampa.

== See also ==
- List of tallest buildings in Tampa
- Downtown Tampa
