= History of Tampa, Florida =

The modern history of Tampa, Florida, can be traced to the founding of Fort Brooke at the mouth of the Hillsborough River in today's downtown in 1824, soon after the United States had taken possession of Florida from Spain. The outpost brought a small population of civilians to the area, and the town of Tampa was first incorporated in 1855.

Growth came slowly as poor transportation links, conflicts with the Seminole tribe, and repeated outbreaks of yellow fever made development difficult. The Civil War and Reconstruction caused the city government to disincorporate for over a decade.

In the 1880s the construction of the first railroad links laid by Henry B. Plant brought the development of thriving cigar and phosphate industries. The founding of the cigar-centered neighborhood of Ybor City by Vicente Martinez-Ybor in 1885 brought an influx of thousands of Cubans, Spaniards, Italians, and other immigrants. Tampa's population jumped from less than 800 residents in 1880 to over 15,000 in 1900, making it one of the largest and most prosperous cities in Florida. This growth continued into the early 20th century as Tampa developed into a modern financial, trade, and commercial hub. This period saw the first Gasparilla Pirate Festival, pioneering aviator Tony Jannus captaining the inaugural flight of the St. Petersburg-Tampa Airboat Line, the world's first commercial passenger airline, and the rise of organized crime as a major factor locally.

Tampa's growth resumed after a lull during the Great Depression and World War. 2. The population exceeded 100,000 during the 1930s, 250,000 during the 1950s, and 300,000 during the 1990s. The land area of Tampa also grew. Originally comprising only portions of today's downtown, the city annexed areas of unincorporated Hillsborough County and consolidated with several neighboring communities during the 20th century, most notably Ybor City (in 1887), Fort Brooke (in 1907), West Tampa (in 1925), Sulphur Springs (in 1953), Palma Ceia (in 1953), Port Tampa (in 1961), and New Tampa (in 1988).

== Etymology ==
There is some dispute as to the origin and meaning of the name "Tampa". It is believed to mean "sticks of fire" in the language of the Calusa, an Indian tribe that once lived south of the area. This may relate to the high concentration of lightning strikes that west central Florida receives every year during the summer months. Or it may relate to the "burning sticks" formed by fires in the vast palmetto fields, part of the indigenous practice of fire management.

Other historians claim the name simply refers to "the place to gather sticks". Toponymist George R. Stewart writes that the name was the result of a miscommunication between the Spanish and the Indians, the Indian word being "itimpi", meaning simply "near it". Another source relates Tampa comes from a Seminole word for wood.

The name first appears in the memoir of Hernando de Escalante Fontaneda from 1575, who had spent 17 years as a Calusa captive. He calls it "Tanpa" and describes it as an important Calusa town.

While "Tanpa" may be the basis for the modern name "Tampa", archaeologist Jerald Milanich places the Calusa village of Tanpa at the mouth of Charlotte Harbor near current day Pineland. Map maker Bernard Romans found certain difficulties in translating earlier Spanish-era maps of Florida for English use and may have accidentally transferred the name north to Tampa Bay, the next large inlet up the west coast of Florida.

== Early history ==
=== Indigenous population ===
Approximate extent of Tocobaga people

Archeological evidence indicates that the shores of Tampa Bay have been inhabited for thousands of years. Artifacts suggest that early inhabitants of the region relied on the sea for most of their resources, and a vast majority of inhabited sites have been found on or near the shoreline.

The Manasota culture is the earliest documented group, spanning from about 500 B.C. until about 700 A.D., by which time it had evolved into the Safety Harbor culture. It loosely organized into three or four chiefdoms on the shores of the bay.

The Tocobaga's principal town was located at the northern end of Old Tampa Bay near today's Safety Harbor in Pinellas County. Uzita controlled the south shore of Tampa Bay, from the Little Manatee River to Sarasota Bay. Mocoso was on the east side of Tampa Bay, on the Alafia River and, possibly, the Hillsborough River. There may have been a fourth independent chiefdom, the Pohoy or Capaloey, centered on Hillsborough Bay near today's downtown and port, possibly extending to the Hillsborough River.

These small coastal villages contained a temple mound, a central plaza, and one or more shell middens, which were trash heaps from which much archeological information has been obtained. These mounds and middens survived long after their builders were gone. However, the vast majority were leveled and/or used for road fill as Tampa and surrounding communities grew in the 20th century.

=== European exploration ===
==== Spanish expeditions ====
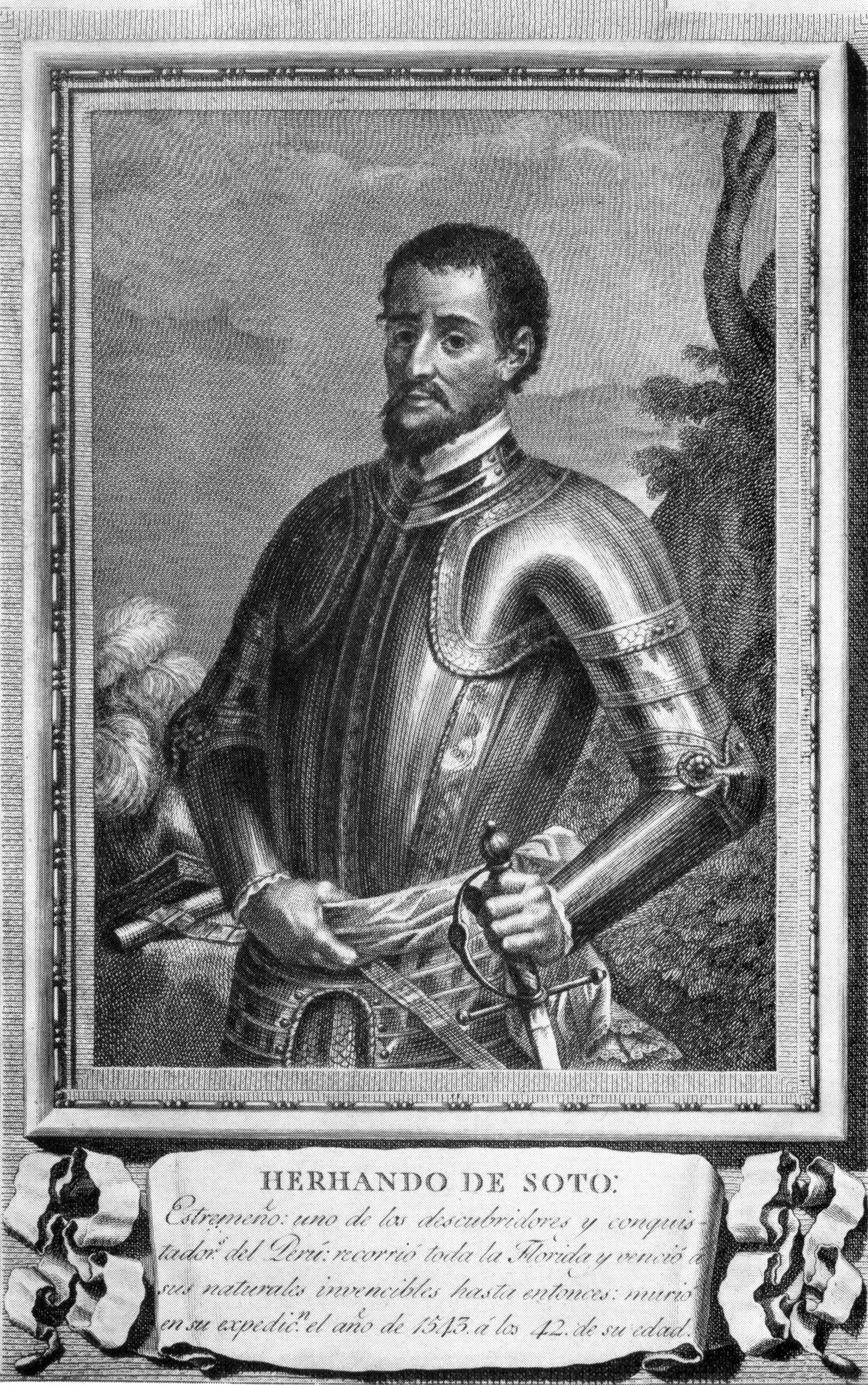
Hernando de Soto

Though Spain claimed all of Florida as its possession as part of New Spain, it could not successfully establish a settlement on the west coast and did not attempt to do so until after the mid-1500s.

The first Europeans came in April 1528. The ill-fated Narváez Expedition landed near present-day Tampa with the intention of starting a colony. After being told by the natives of wealthier cultures to the north, they abandoned their camp after only a week to begin a long but futile search for non-existent riches. A dozen years later, a surviving member of the expedition named Juan Ortiz was rescued by Hernando de Soto's expedition.

De Soto conducted a peace treaty with the Tocobaga, and a short-lived Spanish outpost was established. However, this was abandoned when it became clear that there was no gold in the area, that the local Indians were not interested in converting to Catholicism, and that they were too skilled as warriors to easily conquer.

Though they successfully avoided being conquered by guns, the indigenous peoples had little defense against germs. Diseases introduced by European contact would decimate the native population in the ensuing decades, leading to the near-total collapse of every established culture across peninsular Florida. Between this depopulation and the indifference of its colonial owners, the Tampa Bay area would be virtually uninhabited for the next 200+ years.

==== English rule ====
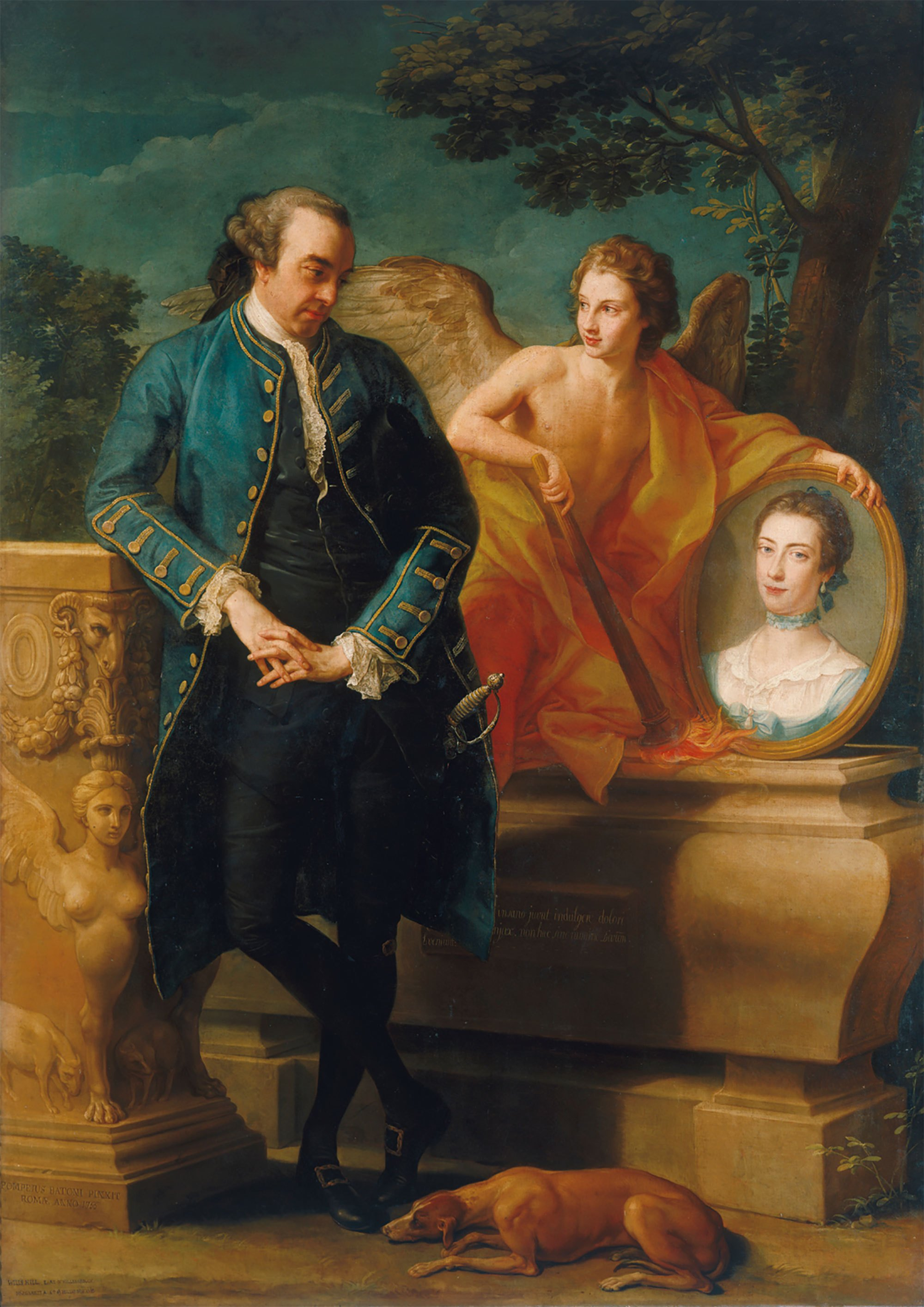
Lord Hillsborough

Great Britain acquired Florida in 1763 as part of the treaty which ended the French and Indian War (Seven Years' War). The bay was rechristened "Hillsborough Bay" after Lord Hillsborough, the then-Secretary of State for the Colonies. Though the name "Tampa Bay" was later restored, the English period is still reflected in the names of Hillsborough river and county. Like Spain, Britain was much more concerned with the strategically important Atlantic coast of Florida (especially St. Augustine) than other parts of the territory and did not attempt to found settlements along the Gulf coast.

However, the Tampa Bay area did have a few residents: Indians and Cuban fishermen who lived in a seasonal encampment at the mouth of Spanish Town Creek, a freshwater stream that once ran through today's Hyde Park neighborhood to Bayshore Boulevard. A handful of these people may have stayed year round, but the majority spent a few months catching and smoking fish (especially mullet) from the teeming waters of the bay, then returned to sell them in Cuba.

Spain regained control of Florida in 1783 as part of the Treaty of Paris at the end of the American Revolution. Once again, the Florida's Gulf Coast was not a vital concern to its European owner.

=== Florida becomes a US territory ===
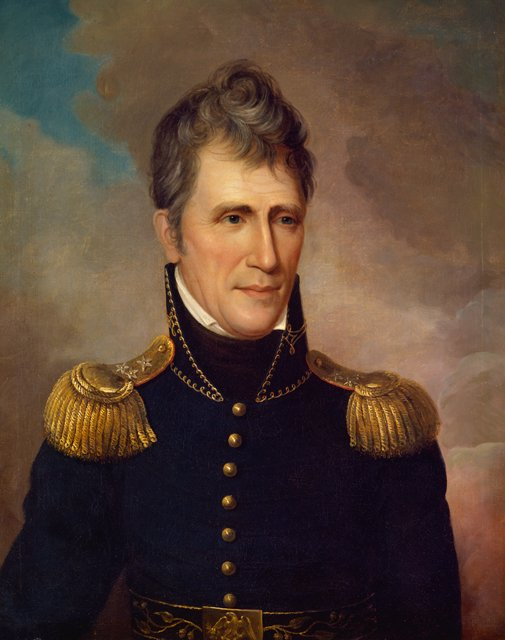
Andrew Jackson, 1819

Since the mid-1700s, people from various native Indian tribes, especially Creeks from Georgia, had fled to largely uninhabited Florida to distance themselves from encroaching settlers. They were joined by escaped slaves from neighboring colonies, and these disparate refugees developed a new tribe, the Seminole. After the War of 1812, Andrew Jackson invaded Florida kicking off the First Seminole War.

In 1821, the United States purchased Florida from Spain, mainly to end cross-frontier Indian raids and to eliminate the southern refuge for slaves. One of the first U.S. actions in its new territory was to launch a raid which destroyed Angola, a village built by escaped slaves on the eastern shore of Tampa Bay.

== Fort Brooke and the Seminole Wars ==
=== Fort Brooke ===
In 1823, the United States imposed upon the leaders of the Seminoles to sign the Treaty of Moultrie Creek, which created a large Indian reservation in the interior of peninsular Florida. The U.S. government then built a series of forts and trading posts throughout the territory to enforce the provisions of the treaty.

As part of this effort, Fort Brooke was established on January 10, 1824, by Colonels George Mercer Brooke and James Gadsden at the mouth of the Hillsborough River on Tampa Bay, just about where today's Tampa Convention Center sits downtown. The site was marked by a huge hickory tree set atop an ancient Indian mound most likely built by the Tocobaga centuries before.

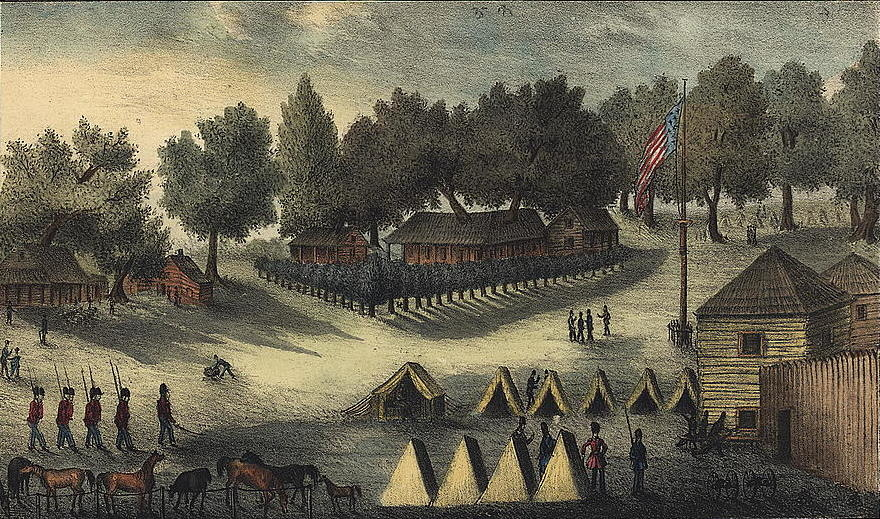
Barracks and tents at Fort Brooke in Tampa Bay, c. 1835

Colonel Brooke, the outpost's first commander, directed his troops to clear the area for the construction of a wooden fort and support buildings, but ordered that several ancient live oak trees inside the encampment be spared to provide shade and cheer. On January 22, 1824, the post was officially named Fort Brooke. John Mercer Brooke was born there. The first post office was established in 1831.

==== Second Seminole War ====
A few settlers established homesteads near the palisade, but growth was very slow due to difficult pioneer conditions and the constant fear of attack from the Seminole population, some of whom lived nearby in an uneasy truce.

Following Osceola's murder of the US Indian agent General Wiley Thompson, in December 1835 Osceola and Micanopy ambushed the forces of Major Francis L. Dade while they were on their way from Fort Brooke to Fort King (near present-day Ocala) in a rout that was dubbed the Dade Massacre, triggering the Second Seminole War.

During the war, Fort Brooke first served as a refuge for settlers, then as a vital military depot and staging area. After almost seven years of vicious fighting, the war was over and the Seminoles were forced away from the Tampa region, and the tiny village began a period of slow growth.

==== Third Seminole War ====
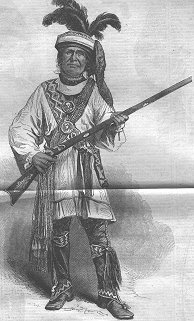
Seminole Billy Bowlegs

Seminole chief Billy Bowlegs attacked the whites at Fort Myers in late 1855 triggering the Third Seminole War. When the news of the attack reached Tampa, the men of the city elected militia officers and organized companies. The newly formed militia marched to the Peace River valley, recruited more men, and manned some forts along the river.

== Statehood to Civil War ==
The Territory of Florida had grown enough by 1845 to become the 27th state. Pioneer families of Tampa during the antebellum period migrated largely from Northern Florida, Central Florida, Georgia, Alabama and the Carolinas, along with their slaves, excepting a few settlers from Ireland, France, Spain and the North. John Parker was the town's first sheriff. James T. Magbee was the town's first lawyer. The first school in Tampa was opened by W. P. Wilson at the site of the courthouse on September 11, 1848.

=== 1848 hurricane ===
A strong hurricane in late September 1848 almost washed away the budding growth. Every building in Tampa was either damaged or destroyed, including most of Fort Brooke. Much of the population stayed to rebuild, and some desperate lobbying in Washington, D.C. persuaded the US Army to reconsider a plan to abandon the fort and its garrison of troops.

=== Incorporation and early township ===
The settlement of Tampa recovered enough by 1849 to incorporate as the "Village of Tampa", which officially occurred on January 18. At the time, Tampa was home to 185 inhabitants, excluding military personnel stationed at Fort Brooke. The city's first official census count in 1850 listed Tampa-Fort Brooke as having 974 residents. Oaklawn Cemetery, the first public burying ground, was established the same year.

In 1855 the first official law enforcement position created was City Marshall. The City Marshall's duties and responsibilities eventually expanded to include summoning members of patrol by midnight along with examining and recording marks and brands on butchered cattle. The first courthouse was also completed in 1855. Tampa was reincorporated as a town on December 15, 1855, and Judge Joseph B. Lancaster became the first Mayor in 1856.

As the Third Seminole War drew to a close, discharged volunteers created a crime wave in the town. In response, a vigilante group of Regulators was created which, in turn, led to lynching's. Aside from pursuing criminals, the Regulators also went after political rivals.

==== First churches ====
Evidence of the young community's growth was seen as its first churches appeared. Tampa's first church was established by a Methodist congregation in 1846. (Note: That downtown church, First United Methodist Church of Tampa, remained open until 2011.) The Methodists were followed by the Baptists, who organized the First Baptist Church of Tampa in 1859, and the Catholics, who founded a parish in Tampa the following year.

== Civil War ==
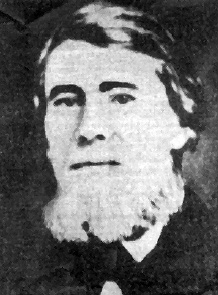
James Gettis, delegate to Secession Convention.

On January 10, 1861, the state of Florida seceded from the United States along with the rest of the American South to form the Confederate States of America, touching off the American Civil War.

Two Tampa locals attended the Secession Convention; judge and Florida Peninsular newspaper editor Simon Turman and lawyer James Gettis. The Peninsular was one of Tampa's oldest media publications. Both Turman and Gettis signed the Ordinance of Secession. Gettis's law partner was Henry L. Mitchell.

Fort Brooke was soon manned by Confederate troops and martial law was declared in Tampa in January 1862. Tampa's city government ceased to operate for the duration of the war.

=== Blockade and blockade runners ===
In late 1861, the Union navy set up a blockade near the mouth of Tampa Bay as part of the overall Anaconda Plan, which sought to squeeze the Confederacy off from outside sources of money and supplies. However, several local blockade runners consistently slipped out undetected to the Gulf of Mexico.

Two barks were employed to blockade Tampa Bay, the USS Kingfisher and the USS Ethan Allen.

Most notable among these was former Tampa mayor James McKay Sr., who delivered Florida cattle and citrus to Spanish Cuba in exchange for gold and supplies before being captured and imprisoned by Union forces. Magbee wanted him tried for treason. McKay Bay, the portion of Tampa Bay adjoining the port, is named in his honor.

=== Battle of Tampa ===
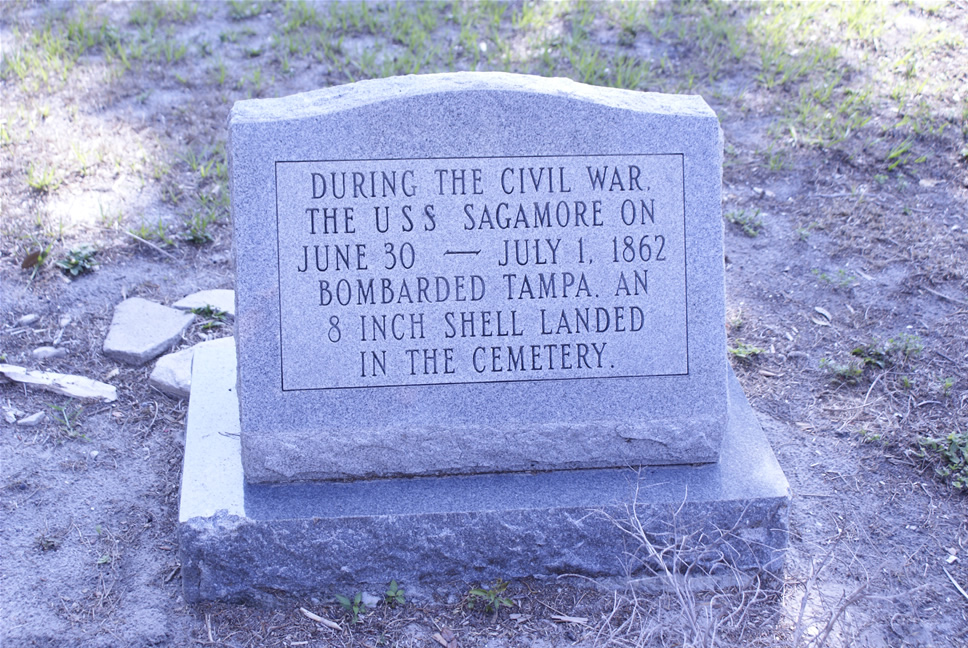
Marker in Oaklawn Cemetery where a shell fell during the Battle of Tampa.

Trying to put a stop to this, the Union gunboat USS Sagamore sailed up Tampa Bay to bombard Fort Brooke under the command of John William Pearson and the surrounding city of Tampa. The Battle of Tampa on June 30–July 1, 1862 was inconclusive, as the shells fell ineffectually and there were no casualties on either side. James Gettis was singled out for bravery while manning the cannons.

=== Battle of Fort Brooke ===
Much more damaging to the Confederate cause was the Battle of Fort Brooke on October 17–18, 1863. The Union gunboats USS Adela and USS Tahoma came up the bay and, after firing at the fort, landed troops near the town. The Union forces headed a few miles up the Hillsborough River until they found McKay's hidden blockade runners Scottish Chief and Kate Dale near present-day Lowry Park Zoo and burned them at their moorings. The local militia was mustered to intercept the Union troops, but the raiders were able to return to their ships after a short skirmish and headed back out to sea.

=== War ends ===
In May 1864, the Adela returned, bringing Union forces to occupy Fort Brooke and Tampa itself. Not finding enough justification to stay, they threw most of the fort's armaments into the Hillsborough River, took much of the city's remaining food and supplies, and left after three days. The war ended in Confederate defeat the following spring, 1865.

== Reconstruction ==
In May, federal troops arrived in Tampa to occupy the fort and the town as part of Reconstruction. They would remain until August, 1869. It left much of the town in disrepair and the population depleted. As one returning soldier wrote, "Tampa was a hard-looking place. Streets and lots were grown up with weeds and the outlook certainly was not very encouraging."

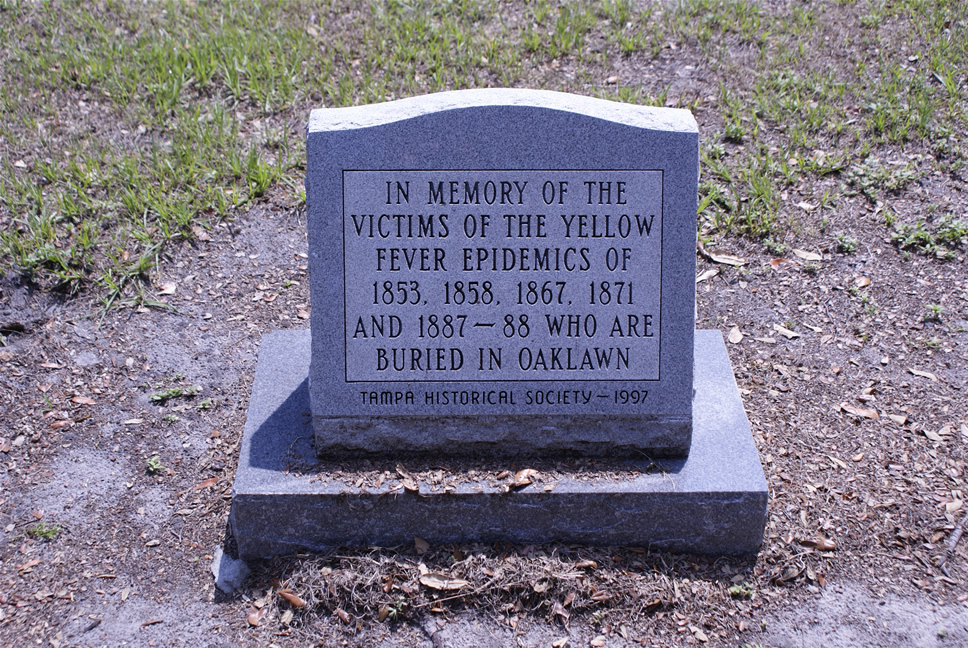
Monument in Oaklawn Cemetery to the victims of yellow fever epidemics.

Simon Turman's wife Meroba Hooker Crane operated the Orange Grove Hotel since 1867, and helped preserve Oaklawn Cemetery.

As farms and ranches in the interior recovered, Tampa's small port resumed shipping Florida cattle, oranges, and other produce, primarily to New Orleans, Key West, and Cuba, which was experiencing the Ten Years' War. McKay, W. B. Henderson, and John T. Lesley all drove cattle to the port during this time. Only sandy wagon roads linked the town with the east coast of Florida.

In 1873, Henderson and Norwegian sailor John Miller established the largest grocery store south of Jacksonville, which would eventually house Tampa's first telegraph. Also in 1873, the Tampa Guardian newspaper began publication, while former Tampa resident Ossian B. Hart was governor. The Gainesville-Tampa stagecoach began operating in 1877. The Captain William Parker Jackson House was built in the 1870s.

=== Yellow fever ===
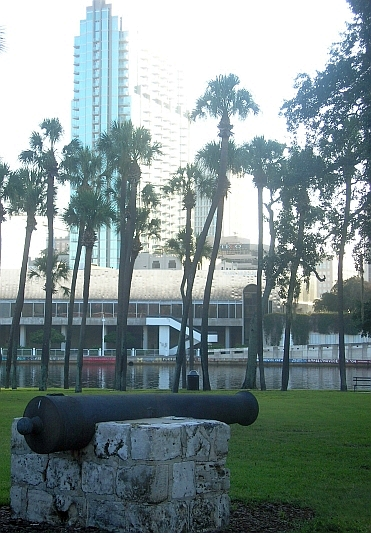
A surviving Ft. Brooke cannon displayed on the University of Tampa campus across from downtown.

Yellow fever or "yellow jack" had always been a threat in early Tampa, but the disease hit with terrifying regularity throughout the 1860s, 1870s and 1880s. Borne by Aedes Aegypti mosquitoes from the surrounding swampland, Tampa was hit by several yellow fever epidemics and scares throughout the period, including severe ones in 1873 and 1887–88. The disease was little understood at the time, and some residents simply fled.

Conditions in the city deteriorated to the point that residents voted to temporarily disincorporate the city in 1869. (Note: John A. Henderson was mayor during these years.) However, it would reincorporate in 1872. As a result, Tampa's population fell from approximately 885 in 1861 to 796 in 1870 and 720 in 1880.

It is speculated that for the 1887 epidemic, cargoes of fruit from Cuba were the most likely carriers of the infected mosquitoes. When the Cubans traded with the Italians, the infected mosquito was able to bite the Tampa man Charlie Turk, which led to the subsequent epidemic.

=== Fort Brooke decommissioned ===
Fort Brooke was decommissioned in 1883. Except for two cannons fished from the river and displayed on the nearby University of Tampa campus, all traces of the fort are gone. (Note: A large downtown parking garage near the old fort site is called the Fort Brooke Parking Garage.)

== Late 19th Century growth ==
Tampa's fortunes shifted dramatically beginning in the 1880s with the construction of the first railroad links to the town and the development of thriving cigar and phosphate industries – all within a decade. These changes combined to bring sudden prosperity and explosive growth – Tampa's population jumped from less than 800 residents in 1880 to over 15,000 in 1900, making it one of the largest cities in Florida.

=== Railroad ===
==== Henry B. Plant ====
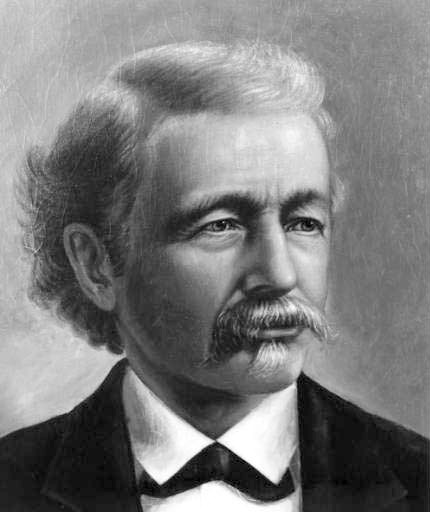
Henry B. Plant

After decades of efforts by local leaders to connect the area to the United States' rapidly growing railroad network, Tampa's long-standing overland transportation problem was finally remedied in February 1884, when Henry B. Plant ran a railroad line west across central Florida to connect the Tampa Bay area to his railroad network, including his South Florida Railroad. Engineer Henry Haines constructed the Sanford-Tampa line. Plant also brought the Florida Central and Peninsular Railroad into town.

The railroad enabled phosphate and commercial fishing exports to go north, brought many new products into the Tampa market, and started the first real tourist industry: visitors coming in modest numbers to Henry Plant's first Tampa-area hotels. Plant's legacy to the railroad on the west coast of Florida is analogous to Flagler's on the east coast.

Plant continued his rail line across Tampa to the western side of the Tampa Peninsula, where he built the new town of Port Tampa City on Old Tampa Bay. There, he constructed the St. Elmo Inn and Port Tampa Inn for a hoped-for influx of visitors. The Port Tampa Inn was larger and had the distinction of being constructed directly on the bay on stilts. Both of these early hotels are long gone.

===== The Tampa Bay Hotel =====
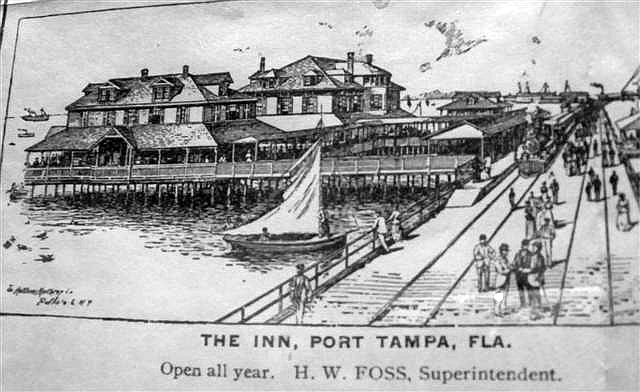
Port Tampa Inn. Note rail line in front.

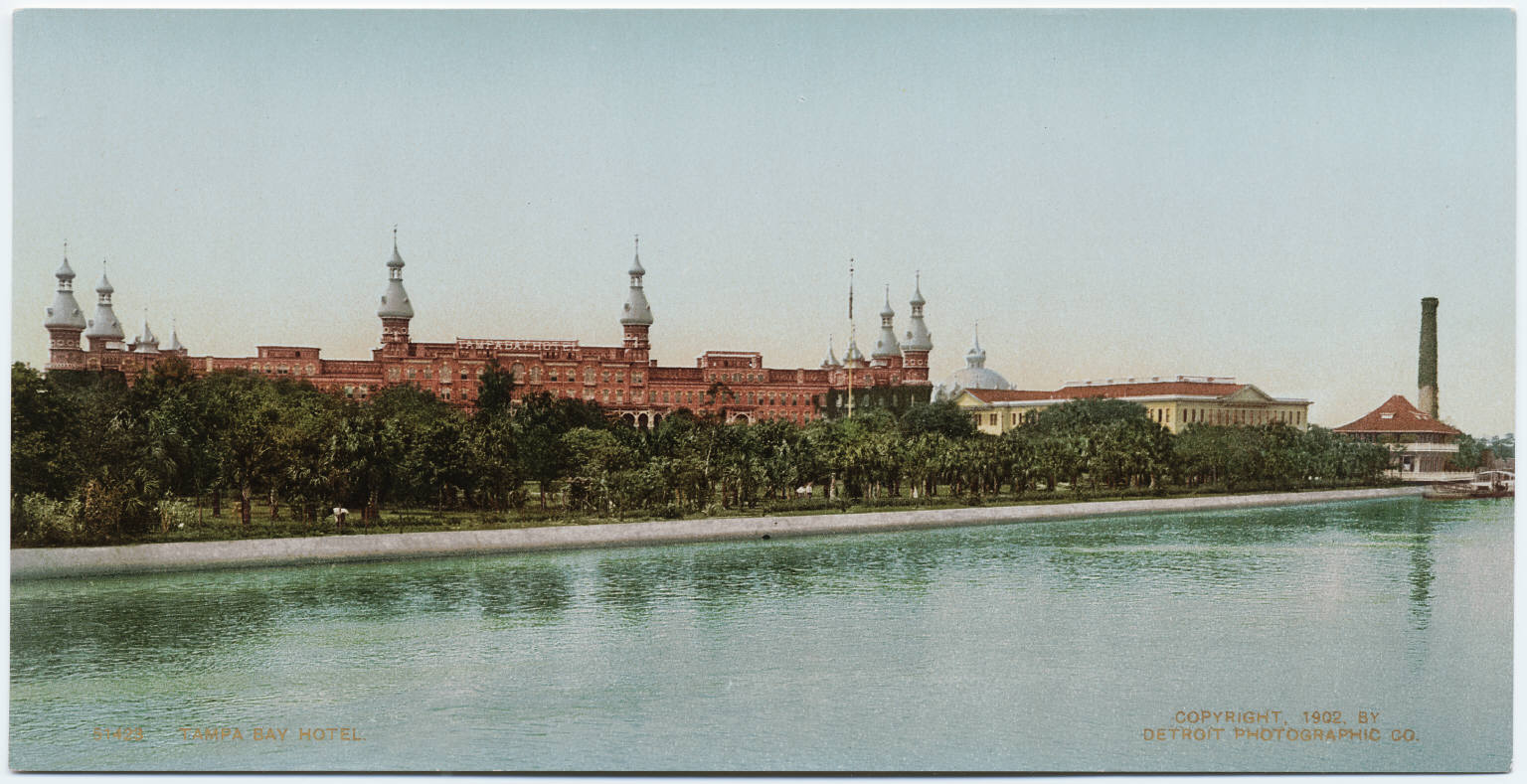
Tampa Bay Hotel, c. 1900

Plant Park was laid out in 1888. In 1891, Plant built a lavish 500+ room, quarter-mile long luxury resort hotel, near the Tampa terminus of his railroad. The Tampa Bay Hotel was on 150 acres (0.6 km^{2}) of manicured gardens at the west bank of the Hillsborough River, across from today's downtown, perhaps the most prominent early feature of Tampa's cityscape. Designed by J. A. Wood, the eclectic Moorish Revival structure with minarets cost $2.5 million to build, a huge sum for the time.

The hotel was so successful that the city council readily agreed to several concessions to Plant, including low, fixed-rate taxes for his hotel and a promise that the city would build a bridge over the Hillsborough River at Lafayette Street (now Kennedy Boulevard) at the city's expense.

Plant went on an extensive European tour while the resort was being built and sent back exotic art collectables from around the world to display at his "playground". The structure also boasted the first electric lights in Tampa and the first elevator in Florida. Heavy promotion in the Northeast US helped the hotel attract steady business for a few years.

==== Streetcars ====
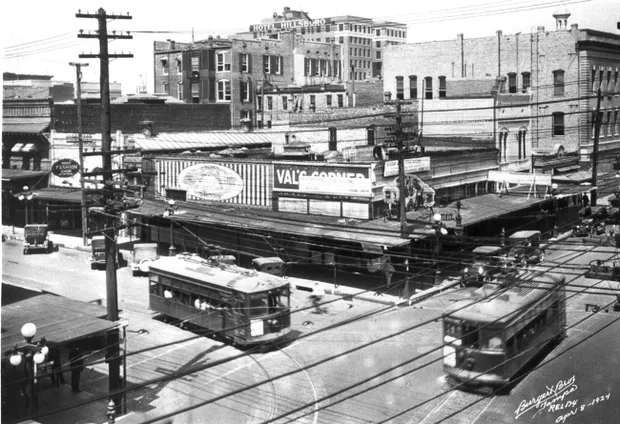
August, 1924

The first streetcars between downtown Tampa and Ybor City used wood-burning steam engines and were installed in 1885 by J. E. Mitchell, operated by the Tampa Street Railway Company, which included Henderson and Lesley as members.

In 1892 it merged with the Florida Electric Company to form the Tampa Street Railway and Power Company, and converted to electrically powered streetcars in 1893. The Consumers Electric Light and Street Railway Company bought out the Tampa Street Railway Company in 1894. The company also acquired control of the Tampa and Palmetto Beach Rail Company, becoming the sole streetcar operator in Tampa. The Tampa Electric Company founded by lawyer Peter O. Knight acquired control of the Consumers Electric Light and Street Railway Company in 1899.

The Tampa Electric Company acquired 21 miles (34 km) of streetcar track. After acquiring the Tampa and Sulphur Springs Traction Company in 1913, Tampa Electric had almost 50 miles (80 km) of track, increasing to 53 miles (85 km) by 1926. That year the Tampa Electric system carried almost 24 million passengers. The streetcar system in Tampa was shut down after World War II.

Streetcars returned to Tampa in 2002, when the initial 2.4 mi (3.86 km) long heritage line was opened, operated by the transit authority.

=== Cigar industry ===
Seal of Tampa

The new railroad link attracted another industry which would finally make Tampa prosper. In 1885, the Tampa Board of Trade, especially W. C. Brown and W. B. Henderson, helped broker a land deal with Vicente Martinez Ybor, Ignacio Haya, and Gavino Gutierrez to move their cigar manufacturing operations to Tampa from Key West. Another motivation for the cigar industry wanting to establish its operations in Tampa was because of the many labor strikes that were experienced in Key West with much of the cigar industry in Key West leaving the city by the mid-1880s.

Gutierrez had first come to Tampa in 1884 due to a false rumor about the ability to find guava trees. (Note: In the 1970s columnist Steve Otto gave Tampa the nickname The Big Guava, mimicking New York's "Big Apple". Halloween in Ybor City is known as Guavaween.) Ybor had been attracted by Tampa's warm and humid climate, which kept tobacco fresh and workable, and its new transportation links. Close proximity (and Henry Plant's steamships) made import of fine Cuban tobacco easy by sea, and Plant's railroad made shipment of finished cigars to the rest of the US market easy by land. This relationship is acknowledged in the Seal of Tampa, which depicts Plant's steamship Mascotte, a vessel that carried thousands of immigrants and tons of tobacco to Tampa.

==== Ybor City ====
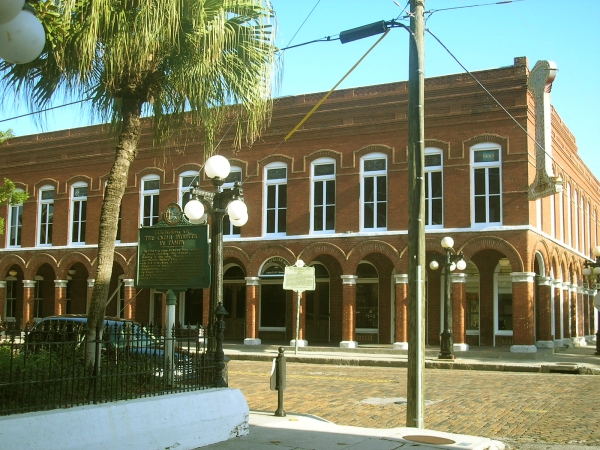
El Pasaje, one of the first buildings in Ybor City

The founding of the cigar-centered neighborhood of Ybor City in 1885, which brought a large influx of Cubans, Spaniards, Italians, and a handful of other immigrants to what had previously been a typical small southern town. Ybor built the Ybor Factory Building and El Pasaje and Ybor City (as the settlement was dubbed) quickly made Tampa a major cigar production center. Ybor City began as a separate municipality, but, seeing the potential for greatly increased tax rolls, the city of Tampa annexed Ybor City and North Tampa in 1887.

Since Tampa was still a small town at the time (population less than 5,000), Ybor built hundreds of small houses around his factory to accommodate the immediate influx of thousands of Cuban and Spanish cigar workers. Other cigar manufacturers soon moved in, such as Cuesta-Rey. In 1896, Ybor built a large brewery, the tallest building in the historic district.

===== Immigrants =====
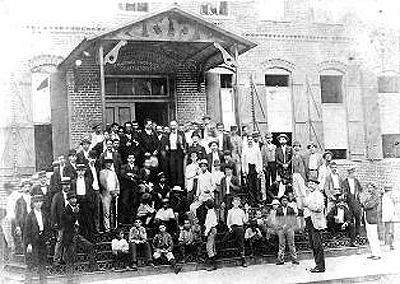
José Martí with cigar factory workers in Ybor City, 1893.

====== Cubans ======
In the early 1890s, José Martí was invited to Ybor City to collect funding for the cause of Cuban independence, which he did alongside Paulina Pedroso.

====== Spaniards ======
In the 1890s, Las Novedades restaurant opened. It closes Nov. 11, 1972. In 1903, Saloon Columbia opens in Ybor City. In 1905, it becomes the Columbia Restaurant, operated by Casimiro Hernandez Sr., a Spanish-Cuban immigrant. In 2005, the Florida House of Representatives recognizes the Columbia as Florida's oldest restaurant and the largest Spanish restaurant in the world.

====== Italians ======
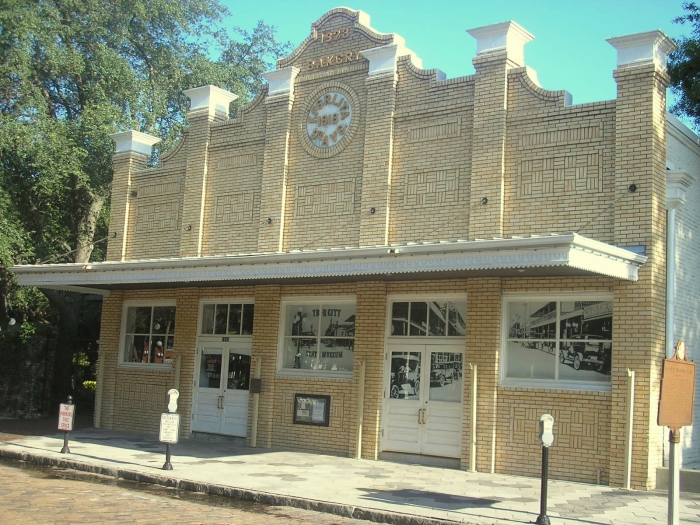
Ferlita Bakery

Starting in the late 1880s, many Italian immigrants also arrived. Many opened retail shops and other enterprises that served the cigar factories and their workers. By the 1890s, this ethnic group numbered about 3,500 people.

The majority of Italian immigrants came from Alessandria Della Rocca and Santo Stefano Quisquina, two small Sicilian towns with which Tampa still maintains strong ties. In 1896, Sicilian Francisco Ferlita established what is likely the earliest U.S. bakery to produce Cuban bread, now the site of Ybor City Museum State Park.

In 1910, two Sicilian immigrants, Angelo Albano and Castenge Ficarotta, were lynched by a mob after being accused of murdering an accountant, Frank J. Esterling, for the Bustillo Brothers and Diaz Cigar Company.

====== Jews ======
Herman Glogowski, the town's first Jewish mayor, was elected in 1886. Also in 1886, Maas Brothers department store was founded by Abe and Bena Maas, also Jewish, which would eventually grow to a chain of 39 stores throughout the state.

==== West Tampa ====
In 1892, Scottish businessman Hugh MacFarlane founded West Tampa, a new community across the Hillsborough River that sought to attract more cigar factories and workers. By 1900, the town already had one of the largest populations in Florida, mostly Cubans involved in the cigar industry.

=== Phosphate discovered ===
Historical population
Census	Pop.	Note	%±
1850	974		—
1870	796		—
1880	720		−9.5%
1890	5,532		668.3%
1900	15,839		186.3%
1910	37,782		138.5%
1920	51,608		36.6%
1930	101,161		96.0%
1940	108,391		7.1%
1950	124,681		15.0%
1960	274,970		120.5%
1970	277,714		1.0%
1980	271,523		−2.2%
1990	280,015		3.1%
2000	303,447		8.4%
2010	335,709		10.6%
2020	384,959		14.7%
source: (Note: 1850 census population included Fort Brooke, which was located outside the municipal limits. Tampa was not returned separately by census enumerators in 1860.)

Phosphate, a mineral used to make fertilizers and other products, was discovered in the Bone Valley region southeast of Tampa in 1880 by "Captain Bill" Kendrick, "the original Florida cracker". In 1886, US Army Captain J Francis LeBaron of the Corps of Engineers found more. Soon, the mining and shipping of phosphate became important area industries. Tampa's port still ships millions of tons of phosphate annually, and the area is known as the "phosphate capital of the world."

=== Fire and police ===
W. B. Henderson was foreman of the first volunteer fire fighting group in Tampa, Hook & Ladder Company No. 1, organized in 1884. On May 8, 1886, a fire destroyed all the buildings on the block bounded by Franklin, Whiting, Tampa, and Washington streets, with the exception of the First National Bank. Also in 1886, the first police force was created in Tampa. Tampa's first police force was quite small, with a Chief of Police replacing the City Marshall, aided by an Assistant Chief, a Sergeant and three mounted officers. Two detective positions were soon added.

=== New neighborhoods, churches, and schools ===
The first hospital was built in 1887. Tampa's first suburb, Tampa Heights was established by Henderson in 1889. The Hyde Park neighborhood was established on land owned by Obadiah H. Platt.

New church denominations came to Tampa, including St. Andrew's Episcopal in 1871, First Presbyterian in 1884, and Zion Lutheran in 1893.

In the era of segregation, the area's black population was required to use separate establishments. This included churches, such as St. James Episcopal, founded in 1895 to serve the predominantly black cigar workers from The Bahamas and Cuba. Other surviving segregation-era churches include Beulah Baptist Institutional Church, formed by freed slaves in 1865, and St. Paul A.M.E., founded in 1870 as Tampa's first African Methodist Episcopal congregation.

Hillsborough High School, the area's oldest public high school opened in 1882. Hyde Park School, now Gorrie Elementary School, after mechanical cooling pioneer John Gorrie, was built in 1889. Tampa Business College was established in 1890, and telephones began operating that same year. In 1892, the courthouse was constructed, designed by Wood and built by Kendrick's nephew. Jesuit High School opened in 1899.

=== Newspapers ===
Henderson assisted in the creation of the Tampa Times newspaper in 1893, and daily publication of the Tampa Tribune began in 1895 when Wallace Stovall upgraded printing from once a week. (Note: Stovall's house on Bayshore Boulevard still stands.)

=== The Spanish–American War ===
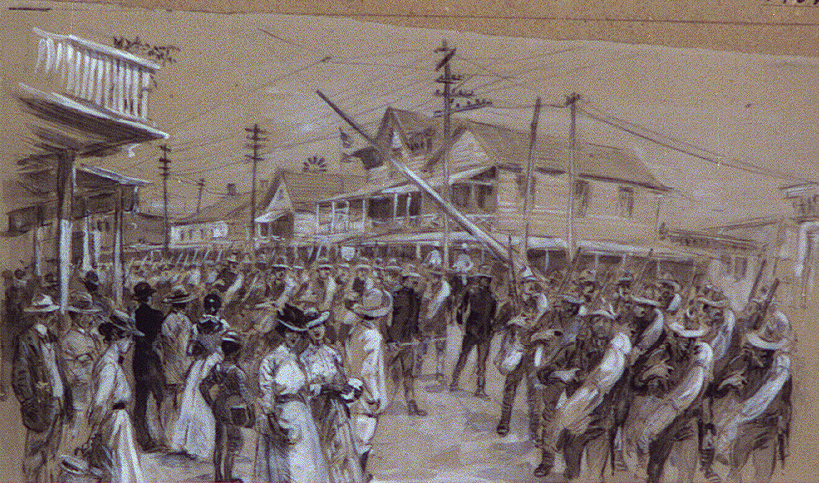
Troops muster in Tampa before the Spanish–American War

Many Florida cities feared bombardment or direct attack by Spain at the outbreak of war. Tampa's Mayor Myron E. Gillette was particularly vociferous in demanding more guns and protection for his city. Eventually, the war department relented and two batteries with “small caliber” guns were erected on Edgmont and Mullet keys at the mouth of Tampa Bay.

Mainly because of Henry Plant's connections in the War Department, Tampa was chosen as an embarkation center for American forces heading to Cuba for the Spanish–American War. 30,000 troops, wearing thick wool uniforms in the oppressive heat, waited in Tampa for the order to ship out during the summer of 1898, filling the town to bursting. Among the troops were Lieutenant Colonel Teddy Roosevelt and his Rough Riders.

Those months were a great boon to Tampa's growing economy. It was the only time when Plant's Tampa Bay Hotel was full to capacity as army officers and newspaper correspondents sought out more comfortable quarters than a hot and dusty tent.

==== Cuba Libre ====
The war was very popular in Ybor City. Many of the Cuban cigar workers had long pressed for Cuba Libre – a Cuba free of Spanish colonial rule. With the U.S. entering the war to fight against Spain, it seemed that their dreams would soon be realized. The presence of US troops in Cuba brought Coca-Cola and the drink.

==== Sparkman Wharf ====
During the Spanish–American War, troops headed to battle in Cuba had to assemble far south of downtown at Port Tampa. In 1905, Stephen M. Sparkman, the first member of Congress from what was considered "South Florida", brought in federal money to dig deep-water channels from Port Tampa to Channelside, allowing for larger ships. In 2018, Sparkman Wharf was named for him.

== 20th century ==
=== 1900s & 1920s ===
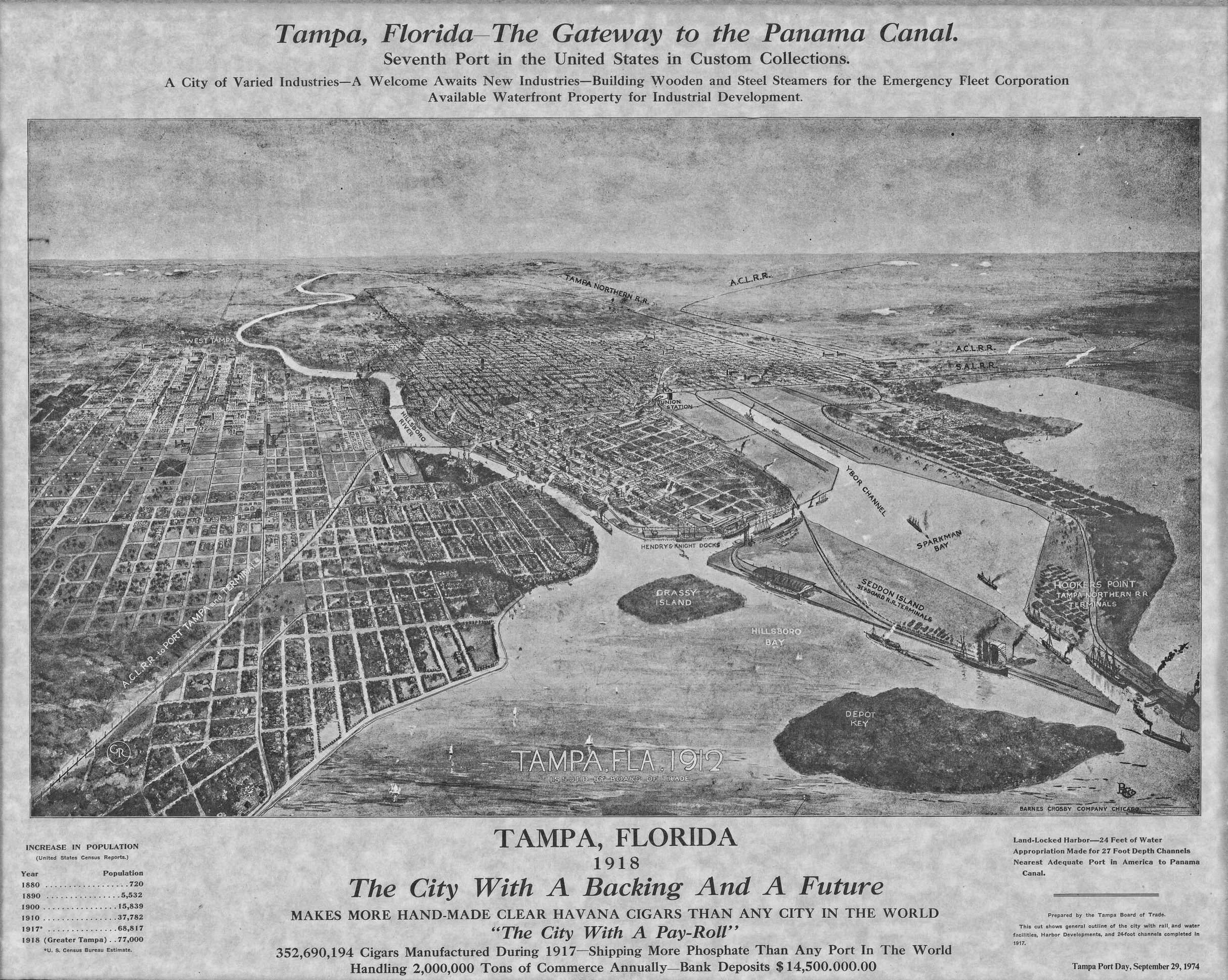
Tampa, Florida in 1912-1918 map

Tampa would see significant changes in it between 1900 and 1920. The Gasparilla Pirate Festival would be organized for the first time in 1904 and is still held yearly. It was created by George W. Hardee who worked for Tampa's municipal government and made it in an attempt to try and draw larger crowds for festivities held on May Day. Seddon Island would be created as a result of a dredging project in 1906 when sediment excavated would be placed on the eastern side of Little Grassy island which was split in half. The town of Fort Brooke would end up annexed in 1907. At about the same time Sparkman Channel would also be created. A railroad bridge would be built in 1908 to Seddon Island. Seddon Island would be a location where phosphate was often shipped out of until the late 1960s.

Politically, this period would also see the introduction of the White Municipal Party as well starting in 1908 with one of its key founders being Donald Brenham McKay. Prior to the party's existence there was several coalition groups. The primary goal of the White Municipal Party was to exclude African-Americans from participating in the city's political system. It would become practically integrated in with the municipal government. Despite the fact municipal elections were non-partisan, voters were required to be registered with the party to vote in municipal primary elections. Although a candidate not from the White Municipal Party could run in the general election, it was generally accepted they could not win. Despite this, the Socialist Party would run two candidates unsuccessfully for mayor in the general elections for 1912 receiving 29.8% of the vote but suffered a reduction in 1916 as they got 17.4%.

World War I would impact Tampa. Many of the city's young "Latin" men would attempt to avoid military conscription by leaving on boat's via Tampa's port. This led Governor Sidney J. Catts who opposed entering the war into a dilemma but ended up requiring all ships leaving Tampa for foreign countries to be inspected. Up until the American entry into World War I, Tampa would be a stronghold for the Socialist Party in Florida. As the party decided not to support the war, this led to the party being weakened all the way from Tampa to the national level. By 1920 the party would become irrelevant in the state.

==== 1920s until the end of the Florida Land Boom ====
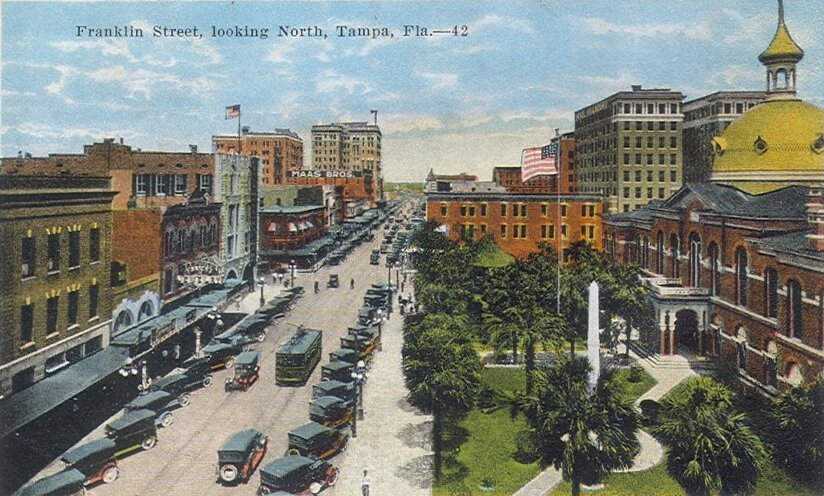
A view north along Franklin Street, 1922.

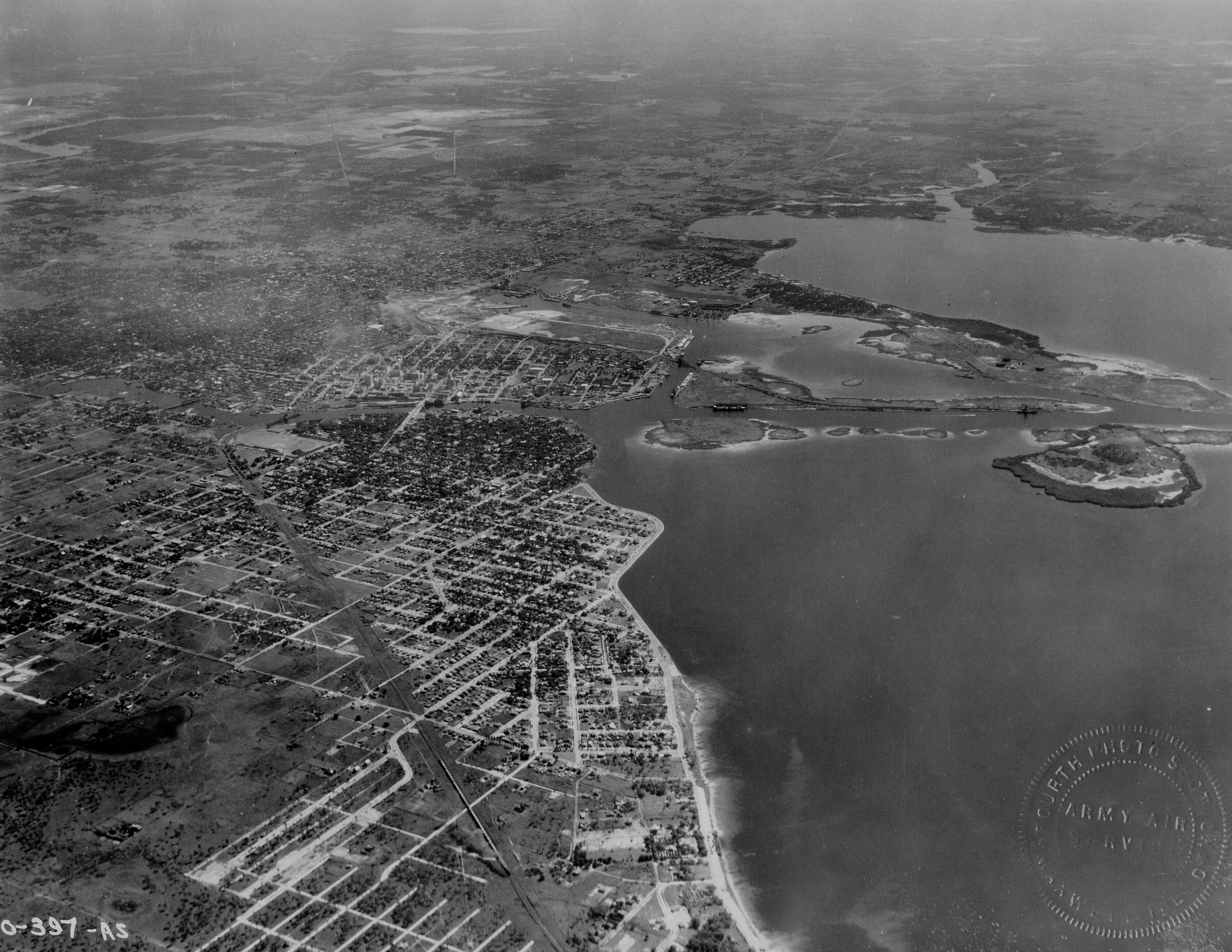
View of Tampa in Dec. 1924

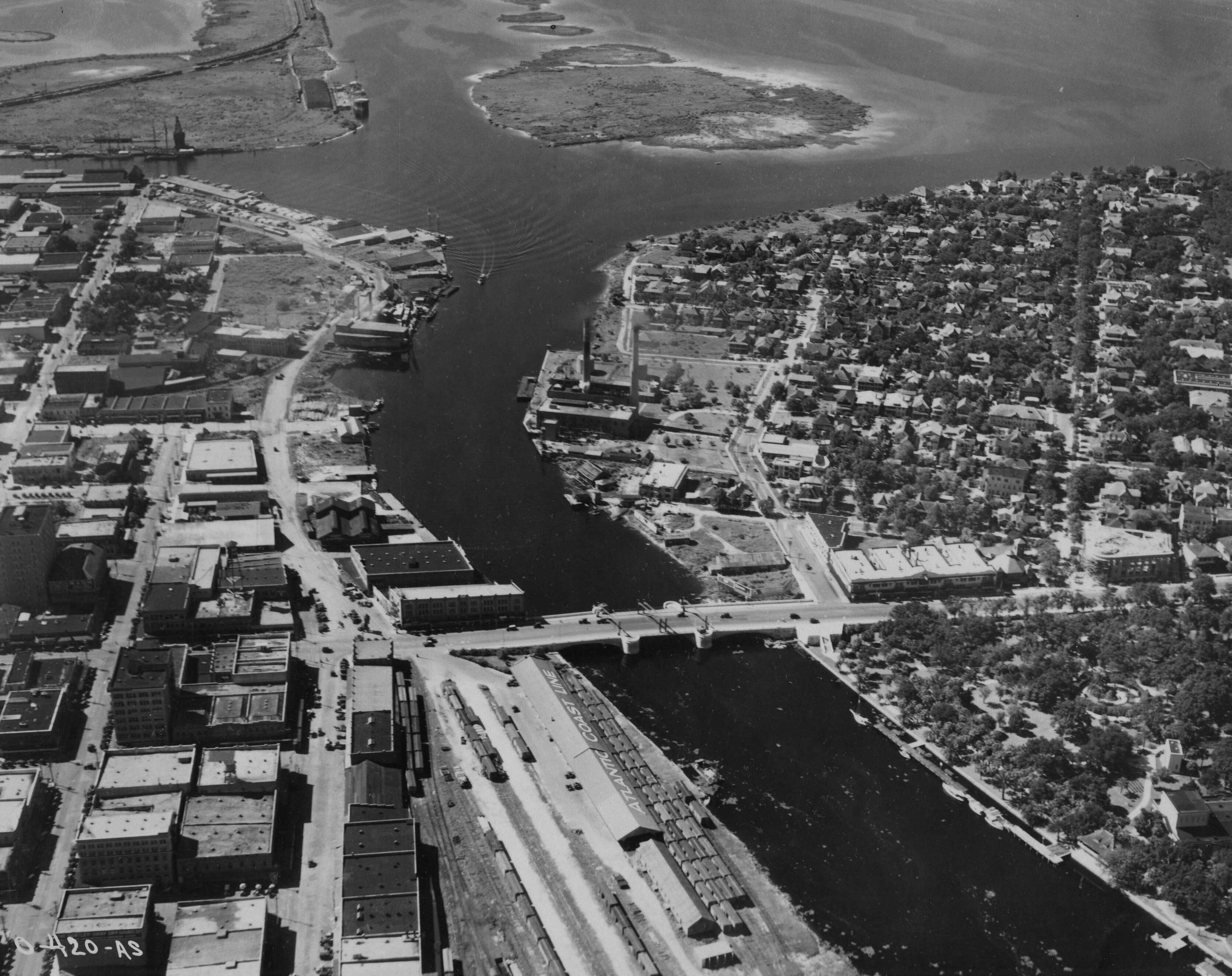
Kennedy Boulevard Drawbridge/Atlantic Coast Line freight yard in Downtown Tampa, 1920s

In 1921, a hurricane hit Tampa for the first time since 1848. Despite this, the 1920s saw the Florida Land Boom.

During this time, Davis Islands, two man-made islands, were built by developer and Tampa native D. P. Davis. After the bubble burst, in 1926, the Tampa Municipal Hospital on Davis Islands was opened, now Tampa General Hospital.

In 1924, the Gandy Bridge to St. Petersburg was built. Also in 1924 the Old People's Home was built.

In 1922, the WDAE radio began broadcasting and the WFLA radio began broadcasting in 1925. Also in 1925, the Municipal Auditorium was built and Tampa annexed the neighboring town of West Tampa. This approximately doubled the size and population of the city.

==== Great Depression and the 1930s ====
As the market for cigars began to wane during the Great Depression, other industries came to the fore, especially shipping and, of course, tourism. By 1929, Maas Brothers dominated Florida's West Coast. It was known as "Greater Tampa's Greatest Store." During 1930, Plant's hotel would close to do renovations on it and the city's present flag would be adopted. In 1931, a strike would happen among the city's cigar workers ending the usage of lectors at cigar factories. Starting in the early 1930s and ending in the early 1950s, every municipal election was tainted by electoral abnormalities, most with alleged mob connections. The first widespread example of this was Tampa's mayoral election of 1931, when over 100 people were arrested for "cheating at the polls". Most were supporters of the winning candidate, Robert E. Lee Chancey, who his opponents claimed had close ties to Tampa's "underworld". After the election, all of the charges were either reduced or dropped altogether. Many of those involved had been on the city payroll at the time of their arrest, and most remained there. In the end, the Tampa Election Board determined that Chancey had easily won re-election. They had reached these results by throwing out all ballots from 29 precincts due to "fraudulent voting". The Board may not have been the most impartial judge of the matter, however, as Chancey had appointed the members himself. During the 1930s, the city would mostly be led by Robert E. Lee Chancey who would take office in 1931 after defeating T.N. Henderson. The city's finances would be in a troubled state when Chancey took office as the interest payments on bonds the city got for public improvements would take up most of the city's revenues. Cuts in the fire and police department would be made in an attempt to get more money with several stations being closed. Remaining employees in both departments would get part of there pay from certificates. The city would borrow $750,000 from the Reconstruction Finance Corporation (RFC) to get funds for WPA projects and a tax would be put into place on gross business for companies.

Plant's former hotel would be reopened in 1933 as the University of Tampa. Davis Causeway which's construction began in 1927 would finally be finished in 1927 as the crash of the Florida land boom and later the Great Depression halted it. Its builder, Ben T. Davis would get a Reconstruction Finance Corporation in 1933 to help with its completion and the bridge would end up opening on June 28, 1934. Despite the downturn in the city, several Works Progress Administration projects would be carried out. During 1935, Peter O. Knight airport would be opened and starting in November 1935 and continuing for the next 3 years general improvements would be made towards Bayshore Boulevard.

To challenge the city's political machine ran by the White Municipal Party, Joseph Shoemaker would create the Modern Democrats sometime during 1934. The Modern Democrats would be socialists and attempt to distance themselves from communism, advocating that "production for use instead of profit" should be done. Shoemaker said in a series of letters to the Tampa Tribune that its party platform would be things such as: utilities being put under public ownership, giving free hospital care for the disadvantaged, doing monthly investigations into the city's departments, a more effective law for referendums and an economic system where the homeless could produce items for their own personal usage. The party would run a candidate for mayor, tax assessor and for alderman. All the candidates would end up losing in the municipal elections during 1935.

During the 1935 municipal elections it would be more chaotic that the last one. Starting prior to election day when Tampa's chief of police (who supported the incumbent mayor) and the Hillsborough County Sheriff (who supported the challenger) both claimed to be the proper authority to monitor the actual voting. Anticipating trouble, Governor David Sholtz mobilized the National Guard to prevent violence. Still, both sheriff's officers and city police were deployed at polling places, resulting in police officers arresting sheriff's deputies and vice versa. Despite (or perhaps because of) the large number of observers, ballot stuffing and re-voting was widespread. The day may have turned violent if not for the presence of the National Guard troops and a sideswipe from the Labor Day Hurricane of 1935, which passed just west of Tampa during the afternoon and pelted the area with torrential rains and high winds.

===== Late 1930s =====
Starting in the late 1930s when the US would attempt to remilitarize as it saw World War II coming, Tampa would see growth in its military orientated activities. This would lead to more employment opportunities being available in the city. Lt. General Howard "Pinky" Craig of the US Army Air Corps would meet with Tampa's mayor about the possibility of holding air exercises in the city during 1938. The mayor would back off as held the city would not be financially able to support their activities. However, two members of the Army Air Corps would suggest that Craig contact Jerry Waterman who was the chairman of the Aviation Committee of the Tampa Chamber of Commerce and an aviation enthusiast. Jerry would somehow be able to work out any obstacles towards holding the maneuvers in the city. The maneuvers would take place from March 14 to March 29 with Drew Fields and newly constructed Peter O. Knight airports would be used in Tampa. While doing maneuvers, pilots would be impressed with a peninsula named Catfish Point.

The Tampa Shipyard Company would secure a $750,000 loan from the Public Works Administration in 1938 to construct a 10,000 ton dry dock so it could compete for getting shipbuilding contracts that were made available through the US Maritime Commission and were authorized by the Merchant Marine Act of 1936. In 1939 it would be awarded a $8 contract by the federal government to build four cargo ships. The contract would generate a large amount of jobs (2,000) for the city's unemployed workers.

The US military would announce it was creating a military airfield at Catfish Point on July 15, 1939. Construction would begin on November 28 with 100 WPA workers being assigned to clear the close to 5,800 acres the base covered. Two days later on November 30 it was announced the airfield would be named MacDill Field instead of Southeast Air Base.

==== World War 2 ====
The Tampa Shipyard Company would build its first ship in its contract, MS Sea Witch in June 1940. However the shipyard would have financial issues and thought it would not be able to complete the rest of the ships in the contract. As the company was doing bad financially, it would search for new owners for it and had new management by the time the United States entered the war. MacDill Field would be dedicated on April 16, 1941.

The Fort Homer W. Hesterly Armory would be dedicated the day of the attack on Pearl Harbor in 1941 after starting construction in 1938. Within a few days, Tampa's Shipyard would convert its previous civilian operations to those that were needed for the war effort. After this the company running the shipyard would run into two controversies, one relating to the shipyard's ownership and another relating to the Florida Attorney General wanting to make the contract the company had between the American Federation of Labor to be closed shop, where employees would have to be in a union to join.

Tampa would economically benefit from World War II with demand for wartime production. Along with economically benefitting from the war it would also have sizable amounts of prostitution, venereal diseases, illegal gambling and more demands for city's services. Rationing would also affect city residents too. Although the city gained many new job opportunities for its residents, there would be a labor shortage as the local area could not provide enough workers. There would also be a housing shortage as well.

During the war, Matthew McCloskey would construct a shipyard at Hooker's Point named Hooker's Point Yard after getting a $30 contract to construct 24 cargo ships from the US Maritime Commission. Hooker's Point Yard would have 3 ship basins in it and the shipyard would lead to creating 6,000 jobs in the city. A brief local subculture would emerge around the shipyards as many of the workers there were isolated from the local populations. Both Hooker and Tampa Shipyard Company would have its own housing at it for some of the workers.

By mid-1943, Tampa would lose 2,000 cigar industry related jobs and prior to the war, the cigar industry was one of the city's largest employers. Mayor Chancey would declare that certain areas of the city would be prohibited to all military personnel on June 25, 1943, as a way of counteracting the city's vice elements. Curtis Hixon would take office on November 3, 1943, succeeding Chancey as mayor and ended up serving for the rest of the 1940s until he died in 1956. Hixon would eliminate tax adjustments and follow a policy of doing audits and collecting overdue taxes more often as a way to increase city revenue as a result of what happened during the war.

When Frank Adamo who was a prison camp physician who would take part in the Bataan Death March returned to Tampa on April 27, 1945, the city would celebrate "Frank Adamo Day" and hold a parade that day. He would resume his practice being a doctor in the city when he returned doing this until he retired in 1973. Adamo would die in 1988.

After World War II ended, the city would recover and grow tremendously. Drew Field would be deactivated soon after the war ended and on March 1, 1946, the federal government would give it to the municipal government. Once Tampa's municipal government got control of the airport they began work at once to convert it into a municipal airport for the city. The airport would start seeing its first airlines in it during April and May. Drew Field would be renamed on October 15, 1947, to Tampa International Airport.

==== Growth after World War II in the 1940s & 1950s ====
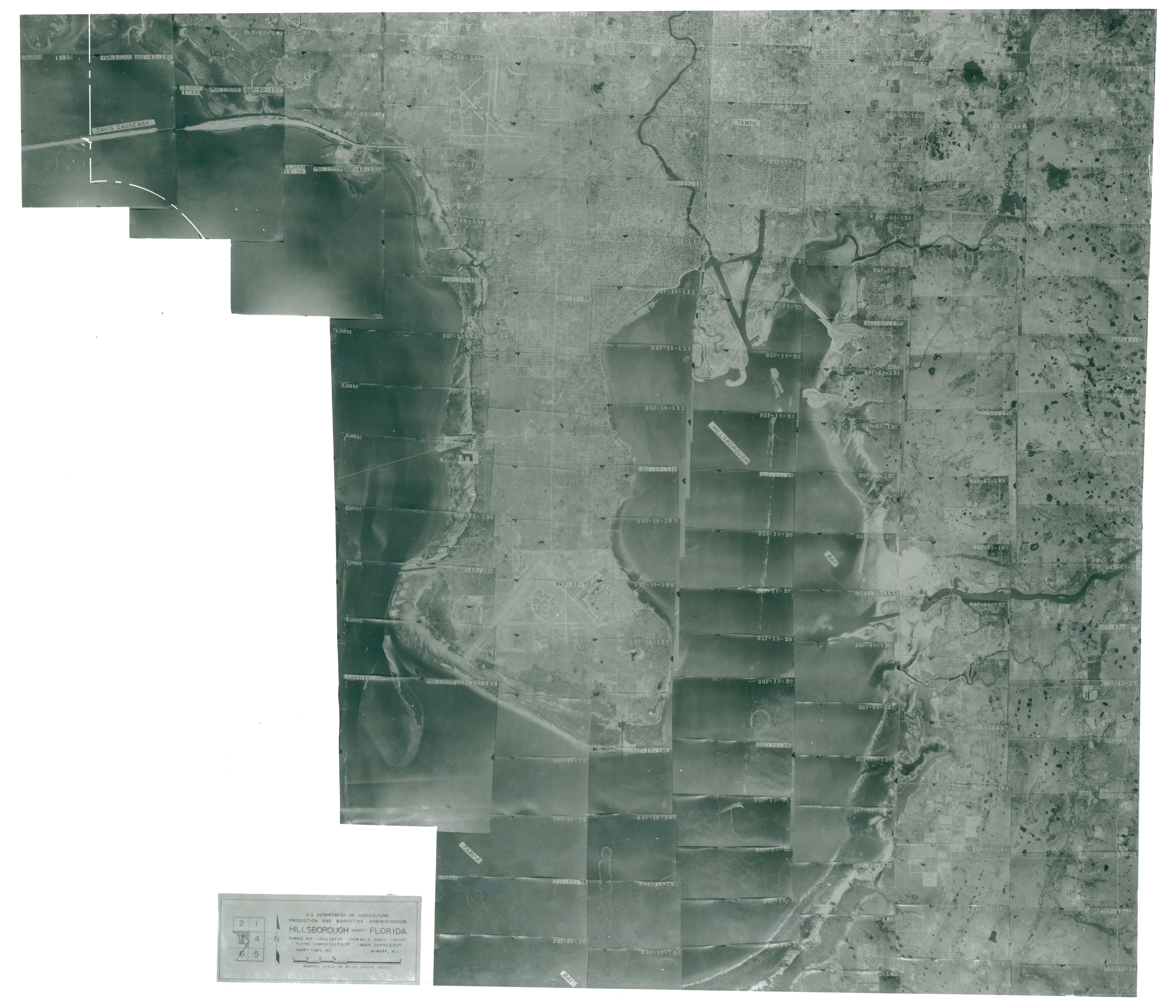
Tampa in 1948.

By 1950 Tampa would be the third largest city in Florida with a population of 124,681. Between 1940 and 1950 its population would grow by 15% but lagged behind other cities in Florida such as: St. Petersburg which grew by 59% and Miami by 45%. Areas along South Dale Mabry Highway, Sulphur Springs and the Interbay peninsula would start to become developed.

Tampa would remain a compact city with a land area of 19 square miles (49 km^{2}) until the mid-1950s. Its northernmost boundary was the Hillsborough River, in the northern part of the Seminole Heights neighborhood. In 1953, the city annexed over 60 square miles (160 km^{2}) of unincorporated land, including the communities of Sulphur Springs and Palma Ceia. As a result, Tampa grew rapidly, growing by 150,289 residents during the 1950s. The growth also reflected on the city's national ranking. Tampa jumped from 85th in 1950 to 48th in 1960. its peak ranking to date.

The television stations WFLA-TV and WTVT began broadcasting in 1955. The Britton Plaza Shopping Center opened the year of 1956. Lowry Park Zoo opened in 1957. Busch Gardens theme park opened in 1959. In 1961, Tampa annexed Port Tampa.

==== 1960s & 1970s ====
The population grew very slowly in the 1960s to reach 277,714 in 1970. Suburban growth hollowed downtown as business deteriorated. Many industries began to move to outlying areas. The combination of the decline of the cigar industry and the construction of Interstates 4 and 275 further deteriorated historic areas such as Ybor City and West Tampa.

===== 1967 riots =====
Tampa, during the Long, hot summer of 1967 would experience rioting in it like many other cities in the US starting on June 11, 1967, and ending on June 15. The initial cause of the riots was the death of Martin Chambers who died after being shot by a police officer who claimed that he was trying to aim above his shoulder but had missed hitting his body instead. Chambers was one of three black suspects in robbing a camera supply warehouse and he was unarmed. Initially after the chase there was protests that were peaceful but later by the evening it would become violent. For the next few days rioting would continue and ended after Claude R. Kirk ordered in the National Guard, Florida Highway Patrol and other local municipalities on June 14. The rioting would end the next day. Over 100+ were arrested and $2 million in damage would happen. Judicial investigations would happen afterwards. The Hillsborough County District Attorney's office said that the shooting was justified after a two-day investigation. Florida Attorney General, Paul Antinori would say that his office investigated the incident. Antinori would state that using deadly force against Chambers was justified as he was a felon fleeing from being arrested. He asserted that those who would break laws would need to accept the possibility law enforcement would use deadly force.

===== City-county consolidation attempts =====
Four attempts to consolidate Tampa with Hillsborough County (1967, 1970, 1971, and 1972) all failed at the ballot box. The biggest margin was 33,160 for and 73,568 against the proposed charter in 1972.

===== 1970s population declines =====
Further problems in the 1970s lead to the first decline of the city's population in a century, falling to 271,523 in 1980. Tampa's national ranking dropped from 50th in 1970 to 53rd in 1980. In contrast, suburban areas such as Brandon, Carrollwood, and other areas of Hillsborough County experienced rapid growth.

==== Urban renewal and suburbanization ====
Urban renewal programs were on the horizon. Despite this, the city only grew three percent in the 1980s to reach 280,015 in 1990.

===== New Tampa =====
A big expansion in the size of city came with the development of New Tampa, annexed in 1988. The addition added a 24-square mile (mostly rural) area between I-275 and I-75, increasing the city's total land area from 84 square miles (218 km^{2}) to nearly 109.

=== Aviation ===
Tampa holds a unique distinction in the history of aviation.

==== Tony Jannus ====
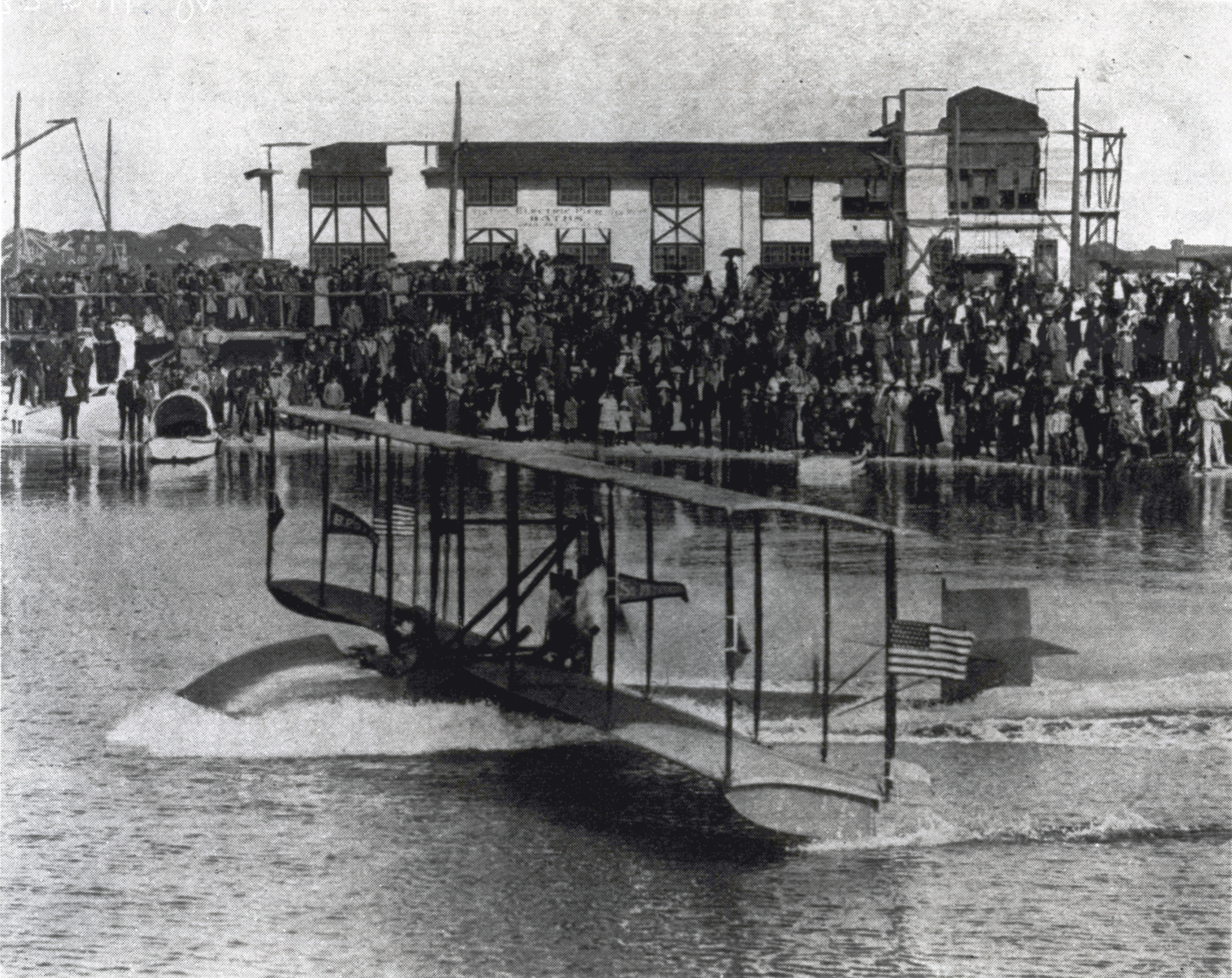
Jannus takes off.

Just ten years after the Wright Brothers first took flight in Kitty Hawk, North Carolina. On January 1, 1914, pioneering aviator Tony Jannus captained the inaugural flight of the St. Petersburg-Tampa Airboat Line, the world's first commercial passenger airline. The airline flew scheduled flights from downtown St. Petersburg, Florida, across the bay to just south of where Tampa International Airport sits today, carrying just the pilot and a single passenger in a flying boat biplane.

The airline's historic significance is officially recognized by the Smithsonian National Air and Space Museum, and its pilot is memorialized annually by the awarding of the Tony Jannus Award to individuals of outstanding achievement in scheduled commercial aviation. A permanent exhibit honoring the award recipients is maintained at Tampa International Airport, which also hosts a 12.5 feet (3.8 m) painted mural from the 1930s titled, History's First Scheduled Airline Passenger Arrives in Tampa, depicting the events of New Year's Day, 1914.

==== World War I ====
Tallahassee native Dale Mabry was a World War I airship pilot and captain. Mabry died piloting the Army airship Roma, in 1922. The crash killed 34 people in Norfolk, VA.The Dale Mabry Highway was named after him, along with the Dale Mabry Elementary School, and a restaurant named originally Dale 1891.

==== WPA ====
During the Great Depression, WPA projects were underway which included Drew Field (later named Tampa International Airport) and Peter O. Knight Airport, on Davis Islands. Knight helped get the airport built. Its Jannus Administration Building was constructed in 1938.

==== World War II ====
During World War II, MacDill Air Field opened up for military operations. There was also Hillsborough Army Air Field, also known as Henderson Air Field, today the site of Busch Gardens.

=== Churches, schools, and libraries ===
==== Churches ====
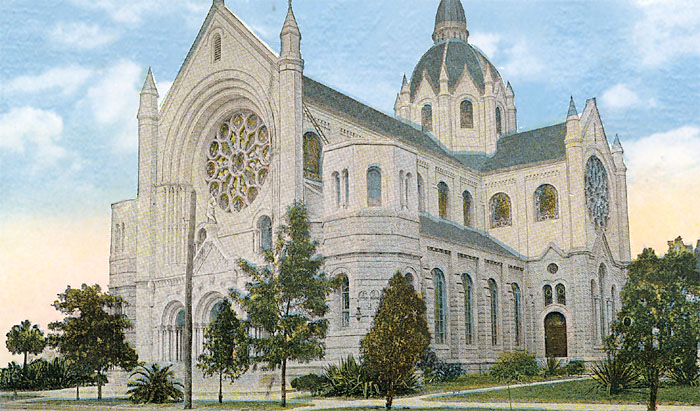
Sacred Heart Catholic Church, c. 1905

In 1905, Sacred Heart Catholic Church was built by Nicholas J. Clayton. In 1907, the modern St. Andrews Episcopal Church was built by Francis J. Kennard and Michael J. Miller.

==== Schools ====
In 1908 the V. M. Ybor school opened for immigrants. Henry Mitchell Elementary School was founded in 1915. Henry B. Plant High School opened in 1927. Hillsborough High moved to its current campus in 1928. From 1911 to 1927, it was at the site of the D. W. Waters Career Center.

==== Libraries ====
The West Tampa Free Public Library was built in 1914. The Tampa Public Library, built in 1915 by James. John F. Germany Public Library opened in 1968. The Tampa-Hillsborough County Public Library System started in 1984.

=== Hotels and theaters ===
==== Hotels ====
The Downtown Post Office was built by James Knox Taylor in 1905. In 1912, Union Hotel was built across from Union Station, which was built by Joseph F. Leitner in 1912. The Palmerin Hotel was founded in 1926. In 1927, the Sulphur Springs Water Tower was built.

==== Theaters ====
The Rivoli Theater opened in 1917. The Rialto Theatre opened in 1924. The Tampa Theater opened in 1926. Opera singer Norma Russo arrived in Tampa in 1932.

The Tampa Bay Performing Arts Center started in 1987, as did the Tampa International Gay and Lesbian Film Festival. The Tampa Bay Jewish Film Festival also started in 1996.

=== Universities ===
==== University of Tampa ====
With Plant's death in 1899, the Tampa Bay Hotel's fortunes began to fade. The city of Tampa purchased the resort in 1905 and used it for community events, including the first state fair.

==== University of South Florida ====
The University of South Florida (USF), established in 1956 on the site of an World War II airstrip - the Henderson Air Field, is Florida's fourth-largest public university. It began the Graphicstudio and Botanical Gardens in 1969 and has since sparked in northern Tampa and nearby Temple Terrace. USF was awarded Preeminence" in 2019 by the state university system. The school infuses $582 million annually into Florida and has an overall annual economic impact is measured at $4.4 billion according to analysis by the Washington Economics Group.

=== Museums ===
In 1962, the Museum of Science and Industry was founded. The Cracker Country museum started in 1978 and the Tampa Museum of Art began in 1979. The Ybor City Museum Society was established in 1982. The Children's Museum started in 1987. Tampa's first history museum were started in 1989. The Florida Aquarium opened in 1995.

=== High rises ===
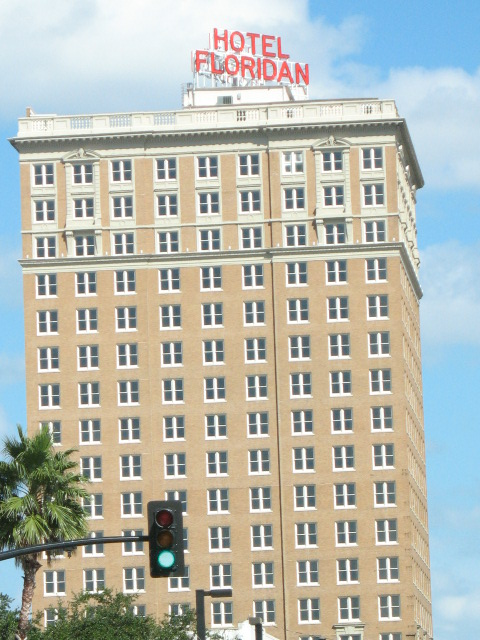
Hotel Floridan

Tampa's first high rise, the Citizens Bank Building was built in 1913 by Francis J. Kennard. City Hall was built in 1915 by Franklin O. Adams. In 1927, the Hotel Floridan opened. The Franklin Exchange Building was constructed in 1966.

The Park Tower (opened in 1973) was the city's only substantial skyscraper (460 feet/36 stories) constructed until the building boom of the 1980s. One Tampa City Center and the Fifth Third Center opened in 1981. One Mack-Cali Center was built in 1983. The Wells Fargo Center was completed in 1985. The Bank of America Plaza was completed in 1986. The Rivergate Tower opened in 1988.

In 1992, the SunTrust Financial Centre and 100 North Tampa, Tampa's tallest building, went up. The Tampa Marriott Waterside, the area's largest hotel, was completed in 2000.

=== Segregation ===
Segregation continued into the 20th century. Most blacks lived in "the Scrub" (Tampa's Central Avenue district), West Tampa, Ybor City, Dobyville, and College Hill. According to Benjamin Mays' report A Study of Negro Life in Tampa, the black population grew from 4,383 in 1900 to 23,323 in 1927. Businessman Moses White was known as the "Mayor of Central Avenue". Ole Pete was supposed to live in Port Tampa.

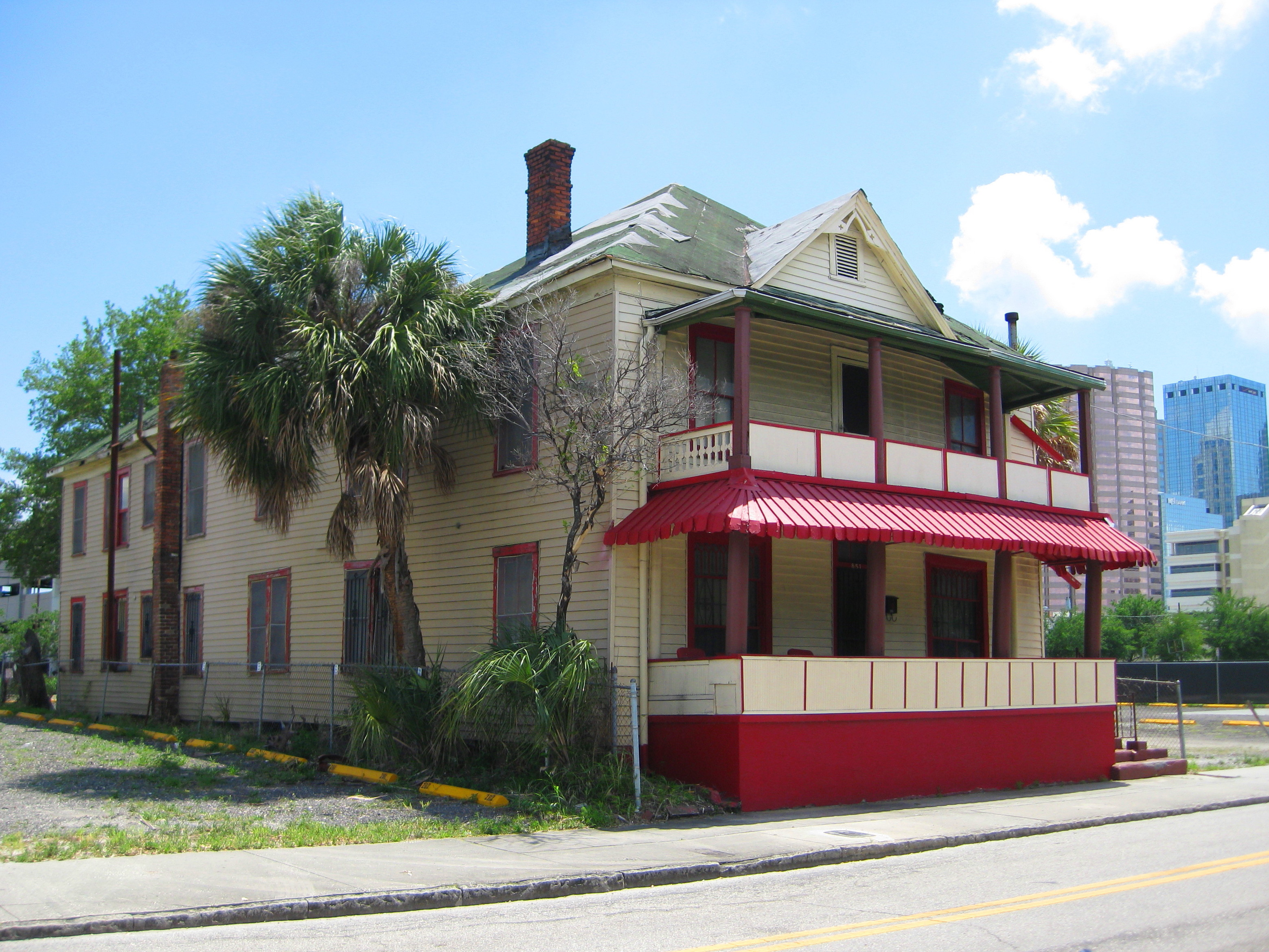
Jackson Rooming House

The Jackson Rooming House, the area's only boarding house for blacks, was built in the Scrub in 1901. In 1908, Clara C. Frye opened a hospital for black patients in her home, assisted by Mack Winton. Her dining room table was the operating table.

A building was secured in 1923 and was purchased by the City of Tampa in 1928. The Clara Frye Memorial Hospital that existed in West Tampa from 1938 to 1967 was named after her. The Tampa Municipal Hospital did not admit black patients until the 1950s.

In 1922, Garfield Devoe Rogers Sr. helped start the Central Life Insurance Company, which sold policies to blacks. In 1938, Blanche Armwood became the first black woman in Florida to graduate from an accredited law school. Black Cuban Francisco Rodriguez became a lawyer in 1951. In 1952, the NAACP moved its state headquarters to Tampa, and educator Edward Daniel Davis was president of Central Life Insurance Company.

In 1919, William W. Andrews opened the Florida Sentinel newspaper office in Jacksonville. The office was closed during the Depression. In 1945, General Andrews's son, C. Blythe Andrews, re-opened the Florida Sentinel on Central Avenue. In 1959, he bought the Tampa Bulletin newspaper, and merged the two newspapers to make the Florida Sentinel Bulletin. In 1962, the newspaper office was moved to Ybor City. The C. Blythe Andrews Jr. Public Library was named in his honor.

Cody Fowler formed the Bi-Racial Commission in 1959. His mother Maude helped develop Temple Terrace and is the namesake of Fowler Avenue. (Note: Cody's house is in Temple Terrace.)

=== Women ===
In 1895, Eleanor Chamberlain was president of Tampa's first suffrage organization. In 1900, the Tampa Woman's Club formed. Kate V. Jackson founded the Tampa Civic Association in 1911. In 1923, Elizabeth Dortsch Barnard was the town's first female postmaster. In 1926, the Junior League of Tampa was founded.

=== Mafia ===
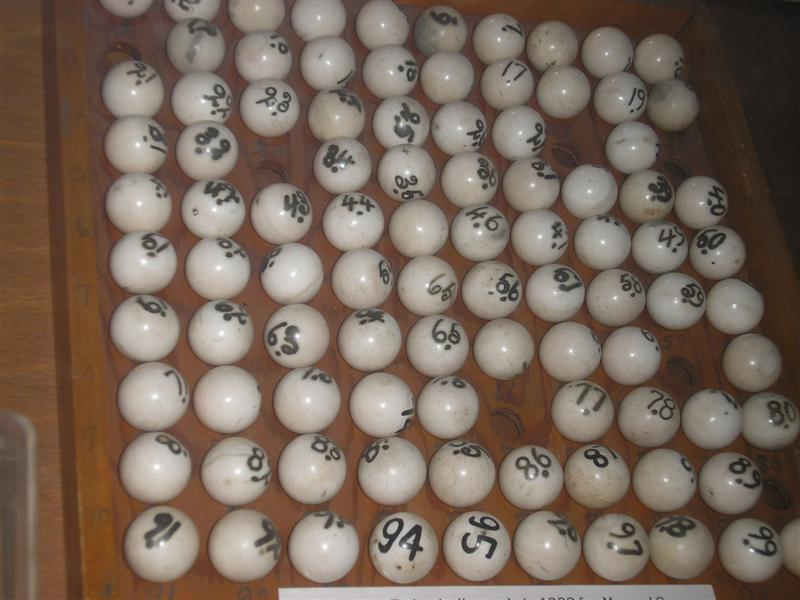
A set of bolita balls on display at the Ybor City State Museum.

Beginning in the late 19th century, illegal bolita lotteries were very popular among the Tampa working classes, especially in Ybor City.

==== Charlie Wall ====
In the early 1920s, this small-time operation was taken over by Charlie Wall, whose father was the town's former mayor and a pioneer in yellow fever research, John Perry Wall, and whose mother was a McKay.

Wall's operations thrived as he expanded them to include liquor distribution and speakeasies (this was the era of Prohibition) and prostitution. Other smaller organized crime groups tried to muscle in on the action, and long-simmering rivalries were kindled.

These organizations were able to operate openly because of kick-backs and bribes to key local politicians and law enforcement officials. Wall was well-connected, and he used those connections to keep his businesses running and put down his competition. Tampa's political elite, which had held an inconsistent but mostly ambivalent attitude toward organized crime, quietly became de facto partners.

==== Trafficantes and the Era of Blood ====
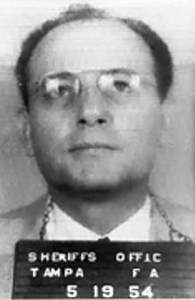
Santo Trafficante Jr. mugshot

While Charlie Wall was Tampa's first major crime boss, various factions vied for control of the area in later years. Ongoing power struggles resulted in regular organized-crime related "unsolved" murders of crime-connected figures in what became known as the "Era of Blood". To protect their interests (and keep gangland killings unsolved), crime bosses regularly kept local officials – from state attorneys to top law enforcement personnel and even mayors – on the payroll.

The first Italian gang in the Tampa Bay area was created by the Sicilian Ignacio Antinori in 1925. By the late 1940s, most of the area's crime organizations were under the control of mafioso Santo Trafficante Sr. and his faction. After his death in 1954 from cancer, control passed to his son Santo Trafficante Jr., who established alliances with families in New York City and extended his power throughout Florida and into Batista-era Cuba.

==== Reforms ====
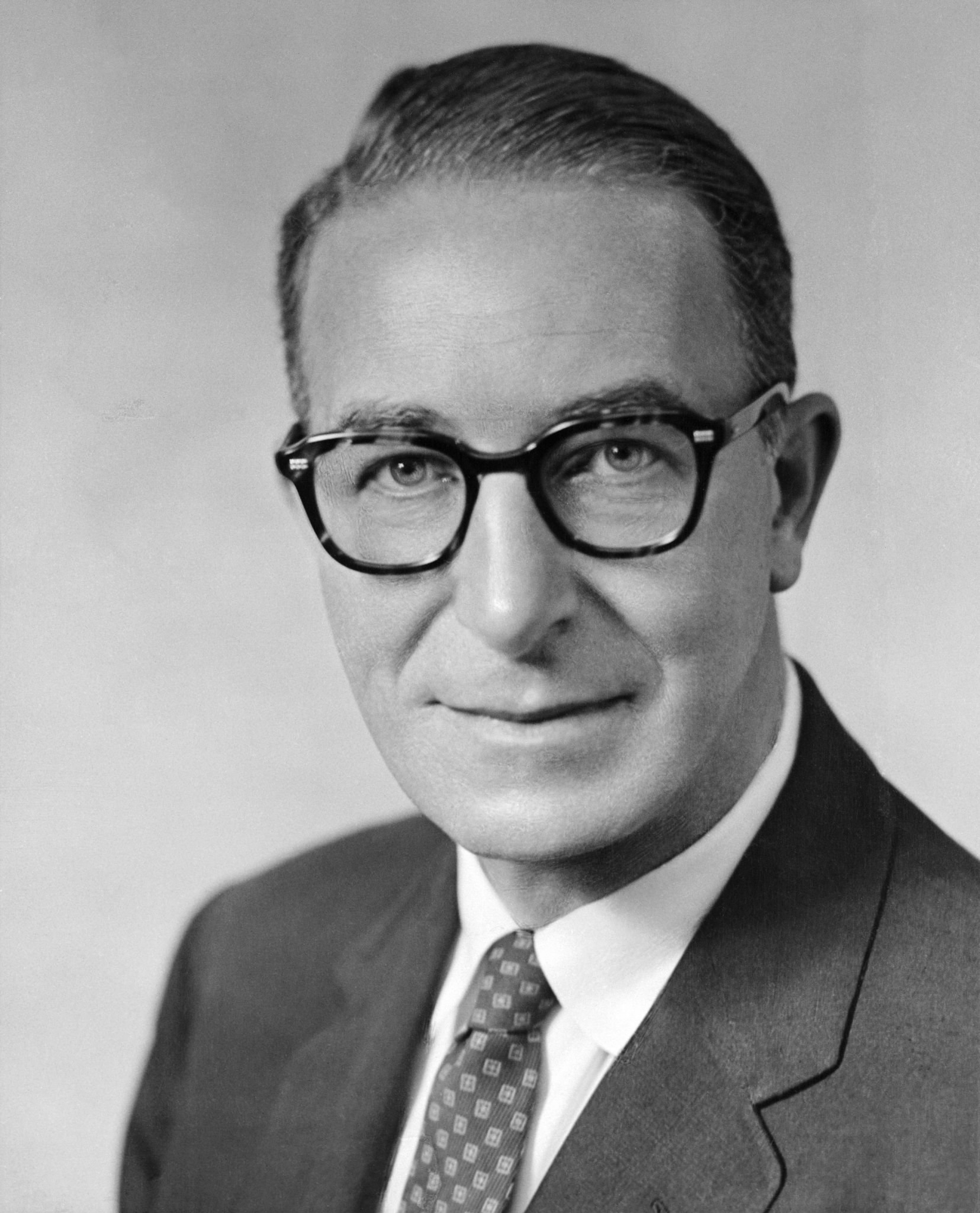
Estes Kefauver

The era of rampant and open corruption came to a head in the early 1950s when the Kefauver hearings, Senator Estes Kefauver's traveling investigation of organized crime in America, came to town. Informants (including the retired Charlie Wall) came forward to make startling accusations of corruption throughout Tampa's power structure. The hearings were followed by misconduct trials of several local officials and the "unsolved" murders of some of the government informants (including the retired Charlie Wall).

Though most of the accused persons were acquitted or given light sentences, the trials helped to motivate Tampa to end the corruption and general sense of lawlessness which had prevailed for decades. Ethics and election reforms were passed, and the link between local government and organized crime weakened.

However, major corruption was not eliminated. In 1983, 3 out of the 5 members of the Hillsborough County Commission were charged with accepting bribes. Unlike earlier crooked officials, however, these three were convicted of their crimes and sentenced to federal prison. This scandal resulted in another round of ethics reforms.

=== Athletics ===
The first athletic venue in Tampa was Plant Field, a race track and field built by Plant in 1899. In 1908 the YMCA opened.

Curtis Hixon Hall opened in 1965, named for former mayor Curtis Hixon, hosted basketball, boxing matches, and concerts.

In 1992, the Skatepark of Tampa was completed.

==== Football ====
Football was brought to Tampa by funeral director J. L. Reed. The first college football game in the state of Florida happened in 1901 in Jacksonville. Reed was from Jacksonville, and acted as manager as early as 1903 for a Tampa town team which wore red and black.

In 1926, Jim Thorpe led the barnstorming Tampa Cardinals against Red Grange and the Chicago Bears in the first professional football game in Tampa. The next venue after Plant Field was Phillips Field, which hosted the University of Tampa football team, and was the site of the Cigar Bowl.

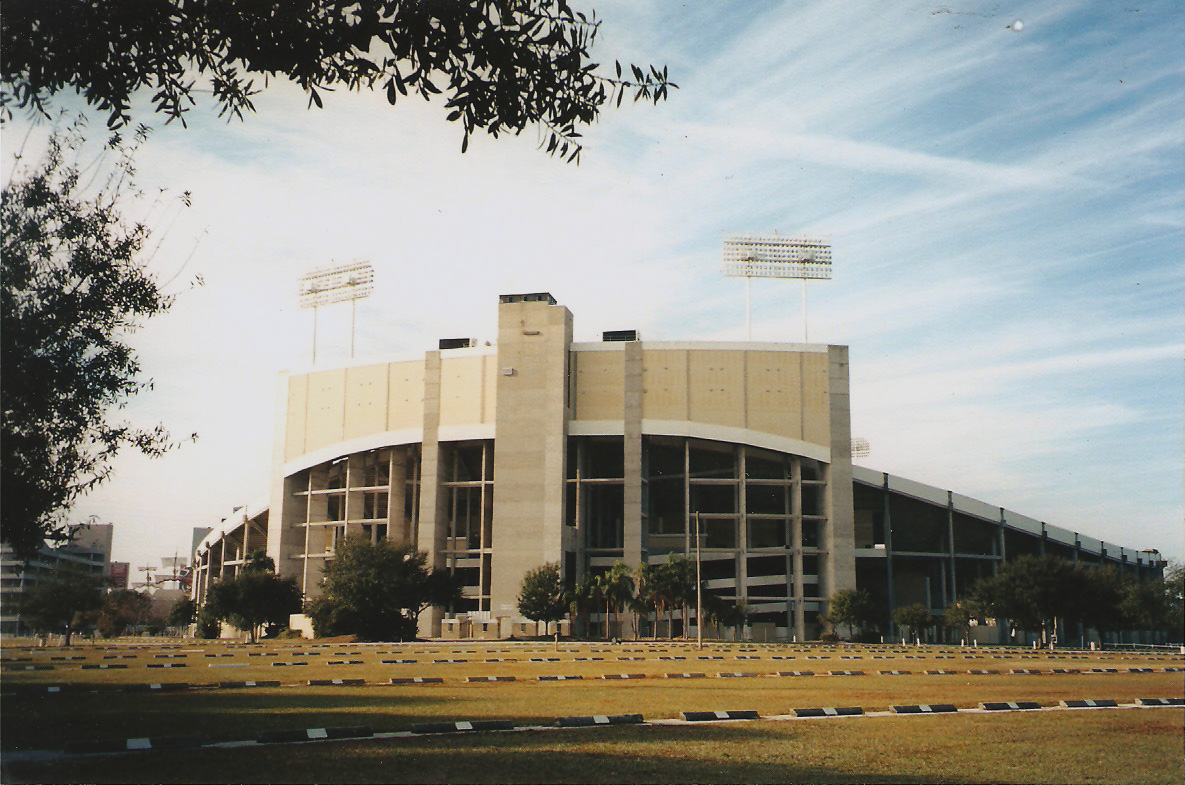
Tampa Stadium

In 1967, Tampa Stadium was built. Tampa was chosen for a team as part of the National Football League's expansion after the AFL/NFL merger in 1970, and the Tampa Bay Buccaneers had their first season in 1976, as members of the AFC West division. The following year, the Bucs were moved to the NFC Central.

The team was the worst in the league until 1979, with a brief period of success from 1979 to 1982 with a defense led by Hall of Famer Lee Roy Selmon. The team was again the worst in the league from 1983 to 1996, until they hired Hall of Fame coach Tony Dungy who pioneered the Tampa 2 defense. From 1976 to 1996 the team was also notable for wearing orange "creamsicle" uniforms. Since 1997, the team has utilized red and pewter uniforms. In 1998, the team moved to Raymond James Stadium.

In 2002, the Bucs moved to the NFC South, and under head coach Jon Gruden the team won Super Bowl XXXVII. Tampa hosted Super Bowls XVIII, XXV, and XXXV. Super Bowl XLIII was hosted in Tampa, and LV was also played there. In Super Bowl LV, the Tampa Bay Buccaneers beat the Kansas City Chiefs 31-9, winning the first Super Bowl to ever be played in the home stadium of one of the teams. Tampa also hosts the Outback Bowl. There also used to be the Tampa Bay Bandits of the United States Football League, coached by Steve Spurrier, and the Tampa Bay Storm of the Arena Football League. "The War on I-4" refers to both the Tampa-Orlando rivalry in arena football and college football.

==== Baseball ====
In 1913, the Chicago Cubs moved their spring training site to the city of Tampa. The original minor league baseball team in Tampa was the Tampa Smokers, established in 1919 as a charter member of the Florida State League.

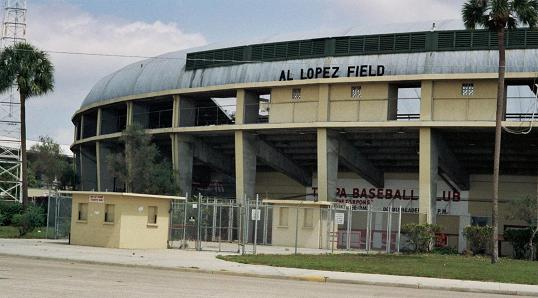
Al Lopez Field

The New York Yankees train in Tampa at George M. Steinbrenner Field, formerly Legends Field, which is the home of the Tampa Tarpons. Al Lopez Field used to be in West Tampa, named for Hall of Famer and Tampa native Al Lopez. Lopez's home is now the Tampa Baseball Museum. USF baseball used to play at Red McEwen Field.

In 1998, Tampa got a Major League Baseball team, the Tampa Bay Devil Rays, which plays at Tropicana Field. Hall of Famer Wade Boggs grew up in Tampa, as did Tony La Russa, Lou Piniella, Tino Martinez, Luis Gonzalez, Doc Gooden, and Gary Sheffield.

The Devil Rays changed their name to the Rays in 2008. USF Baseball Stadium opened in 2011. The Tampa Baseball Museum opened in 2014.

==== Basketball ====
USF basketball plays at the Yuengling Center, formerly the Sun Dome.

During the COVID-19 pandemic, the Toronto Raptors spent the 2020–21 season at Amalie Arena.

==== Hockey ====
The Tampa Bay Lightning of the National Hockey League formed in 1992, and plays at Benchmark International Arena, formerly the Ice Palace, St. Pete Times Forum, Tampa Bay Times Forum, and Amalie Arena. The Lightning won the Stanley Cup in 2004 and again in 2020 and 2021.

==== Soccer ====
There used to be the Tampa Bay Rowdies and Tampa Bay Mutiny.

==== Tennis ====
From 1979 to 1990, Tampa hosted the Eckerd Open.

==== Golf ====
Garfield Rogers built Rogers Park, the first golf course for blacks in Tampa. In 1974, the City of Tampa took over Babe Zaharias's golf course in the Forest Hills neighborhood.

== 21st century ==
The Stovall was built in 2001. The Ruby programming language conference was held in Tampa in 2001. The Florida Museum of Photographic Arts also started in 2001. The American Victory Ship & Museum with SS American Victory started in 2003. The Ford Amphitheater, and Seminole Hard Rock Hotel and Casino Tampa in Tampa Indian Reservation, also opened in 2004.

=== 2002 plane crash ===
On January 5, 2002, just four months after the September 11, 2001, terrorist attacks, 15-year-old amateur pilot Charles Bishop crashed a Cessna plane into the Bank of America Plaza. Bishop died, but there were no other injuries (because the crash occurred on a Saturday, when few people were in the building). A suicide note found in the wreckage expressed support for Osama bin Laden. Bishop had been taking a prescription medicine for acne called Accutane that may have had the side effect of depression or severe psychosis. His family later sued Hoffman-La Roche, the company that makes Accutane, for $70 million; however, an autopsy found no traces of the drug in the teenager's system.

=== 2004 hurricane season ===
The 2004 Atlantic Hurricane Season was historically busy for all of Florida, including Tampa. Tampa's climate was affected by a record four hurricanes that year; Frances, Jeanne, Charley, and to a lesser extent, Ivan.

The eyes of both Jeanne and Frances passed within a few miles of Tampa as they slashed their way across the state from the east coast. Charley was forecast to make a direct hit on Tampa Bay from the south (the worst-case scenario for local flooding). But the storm made a sudden and unexpected turn to the northeast and brought only tropical storm force winds to Tampa, devastating the Ft. Myers/Port Charlotte area instead. Ivan roared past the Florida gulf coast on its way to landfall near the Alabama/Florida border, passing near enough to bring high seas and stormy conditions to the Tampa area.

=== Downtown revitalization ===
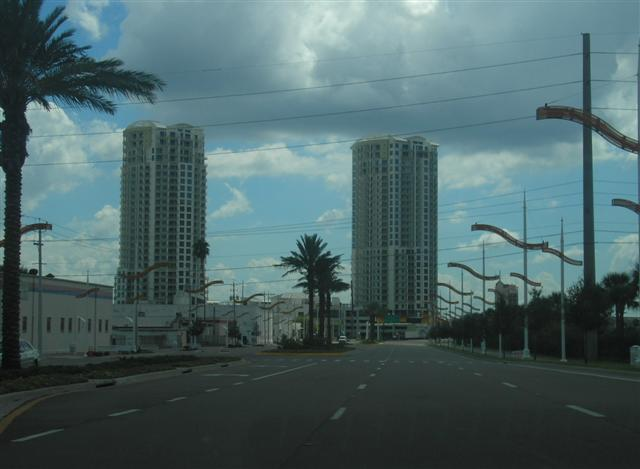
Luxury condos built in the former warehouse district of Channelside, downtown Tampa

Former Tampa mayor Pam Iorio made the redevelopment of downtown a priority and focused on bringing residents into the decidedly non-residential area. Several residential and mixed-development high-rises were planned and constructed. The Alagon on Bayshore was built in 2006. The Towers of Channelside and SkyPoint were finished in 2007. Element was built in 2009.

==== Riverwalk ====
Another of Mayor Iorio's initiatives was to improve the Tampa Riverwalk. The development plan expanded use of the land along the Hillsborough River in downtown, where Tampa was first established. The Curtis Hixon Waterfront Park opened in 2010, next to the Riverwalk and the former site of Curtis Hixon Hall. Water Works Park opened in 2014.

===== Museums =====
Several museums were part of the plan, including the Florida Museum of Photographic Arts, which relocated in 2006, the Tampa Bay History Center, which began in 2009; the Tampa Children's Museum, which relocated in 2010 and was renamed the Glazer Children's Museum, the Tampa Museum of Art, which relocated in 2010.

Tampa Mayor Bob Buckhorn has continued the development and redevelopment focused work. The 2012 Republican National Convention was held in Tampa.

===== Historical monuments =====
In 2012, commissions for six bronze busts of prominent figures from the history of Tampa put on the Riverwalk, sculpted by Steven Dickey. They included Mocoso, Tocobaga, and Pohoy mound builders; James McKay Sr.; Vicente Martinez Ybor; Henry B. Plant; Eleanor McWilliams Chamberlain; and Clara C. Frye. (Note: Nine historians including former Tampa Tribune reporter Leland Hawes and Tampa Bay History Center curator Rodney Kite-Powell made the selections.)

In 2013, six additional busts were unveiled on the Riverwalk: Cyril Blythe Andrews; Cody Fowler; Kate V. Jackson; Peter O. Knight; Paulina Pedroso; and Garfield Devoe Rogers.

Another six were unveiled in December 2014. They included: Blanche Armwood; Herman Glogowski; Gavino Gutierrez; Bena Wolf Maas; Hugh Macfarlane; and Moses White.

Another six were unveiled in 2016. They included: Meroba Hooker Crane, Edward Daniel Davis, Ignacio Haya, Francisco Rodriguez, Norma Tina Russo, and Mack Ramsey Winton.

In 2017, six more were added. They include: Frank Adamo, Elizabeth D. Barnard, Ossian B. Hart, Victoriano Manteiga, Benjamin Mays, and Stephen M. Sparkman.

== See also ==
- Timeline of Tampa, Florida
- History of Brandon
- List of people from Tampa, Florida
