= Tampa Film Festival =

Tampa Film Festival may refer to:

- Gasparilla Film Festival
- India International Film Festival of Tampa Bay
- Tampa Bay Jewish Film Festival
- Tampa International Gay and Lesbian Film Festival
