= Tampa-Fort Brooke, Florida =

Tampa-Fort Brooke was a single census area in Hillsborough County, Florida, recorded by the United States Census Bureau during the 1850 federal census with the name Tampa, including Fort Brook[e]. The population was 974, which was the fifth largest enumerated settlement in Florida.

== Designation ==
The census area was designated to include the village of Tampa and Fort Brooke military reservation, which were separate entities. Tampa, itself, wasn't returned separately by enumerators until 1870 when the town recorded a population of 796. Fort Brooke wasn't returned separately until 1890, when the town recorded a population of 448. Fort Brooke was annexed into Tampa in 1907.

== Demographics ==
The racial makeup of the area in 1850 were 64.8% (631) Whites and 35.2% (343) African Americans, in which 98.0% (336) were slaves and only 2.0% (7) were free. For every 100 females, there were 170.5 males (614 males and 360 females).

== See also ==
- Fort Brooke
- History of Tampa, Florida
