= Dobyville =

Coordinates: 27.940°N 82.477°W

Dobyville was a historic black neighborhood in what is now West Hyde Park, Tampa, Florida. It was named for Richard Cornelius (properly, Curtis) Doby, a resident philanthropic black businessman and community leader.

Dobyville encompassed the area from North B Street on the north to Swann Avenue to the south, from Albany Avenue on the west to Willow Avenue on the east. The neighborhood's modest homes, warehouses and supporting businesses lined each side of the railroad tracks that pass diagonally thru the area from northeast to southwest. By the turn of the 20th century, Jim Crow segregation relegated the majority of Tampa's black population to a handful of racially delineated neighborhoods including "the Scrub" (in Tampa's Central Avenue district), West Tampa, Ybor City, Dobyville, and College Hill.

== History ==
A 1927 study found that approximately 10 percent of Tampa's blacks called Dobyville home at that time. One of the few buildings that remain today is the Doby family house at 1405 Azeele St. What had begun as haphazard off-site housing for gardeners, carpenters, maids and nannies of affluent Hyde Park residents became a community with its own teachers, pastors, doctors and entrepreneurs.

The Seybold Bakery, located at 420 South Dakota Avenue, was built in 1926 in the heart of Dobyville adjacent to the railroad. The bakery, built by Daylusia Investment Company, Inc, Miami, in the Mediterranean Revival style of the 1920s, contributed to the commerce and stability of the area and provided employment to many living in the neighborhood. The Seybold Bakery Building is identified as a contributory structure within the National Register District of Hyde Park.

Doby donated the land for Dobyville School, a segregated public facility for African-Americans. The Dobyville School, formerly located at 407 S. Dakota Avenue was, like Tampa's other black public schools, under-funded and neglected by the school board. The school's lunchroom was condemned in the late 1940s, but children still attended until 1966 when the school closed and it was demolished for construction of the Crosstown Expressway.

Richard Doby also donated land for the 2.5 acres (1.0 ha) Zion Cemetery, thought to contain some 850 burials. The cemetery came to be obliterated by redevelopment as early as the late 1920s and extending into the 1950s. Ground-penetrating radar revealed no fewer than 314 caskets in undisturbed parts of the cemetery in 2020. The land, which currently contains storefronts and warehouses, is owned by Richard Gonzmart.

Construction of the Crosstown Expressway (now the Lee Roy Selmon Expressway) adjacent to the existing railroad split Dobyville in two. Large construction projects, such as an automobile dealership and a Walmart, are sited on land that was once homes and businesses owned by Dobyville's families. Few buildings remain from the neighborhood's past, with demolition and new construction depleting the neighborhood.

== Historic District Designation ==
The National Trust for Historic Preservation included much of Dobyville in the Hyde Park Historic District when it landmarked the area in 1985. Hyde Park was designated locally three years after the national recognition, but the area once occupied by Dobyville has been specifically excluded from the local designation. Such an exclusion means that historic properties in what was Dobyville are not protected.
