= Palmerin Hotel =

- U.S. National Register of Historic Places
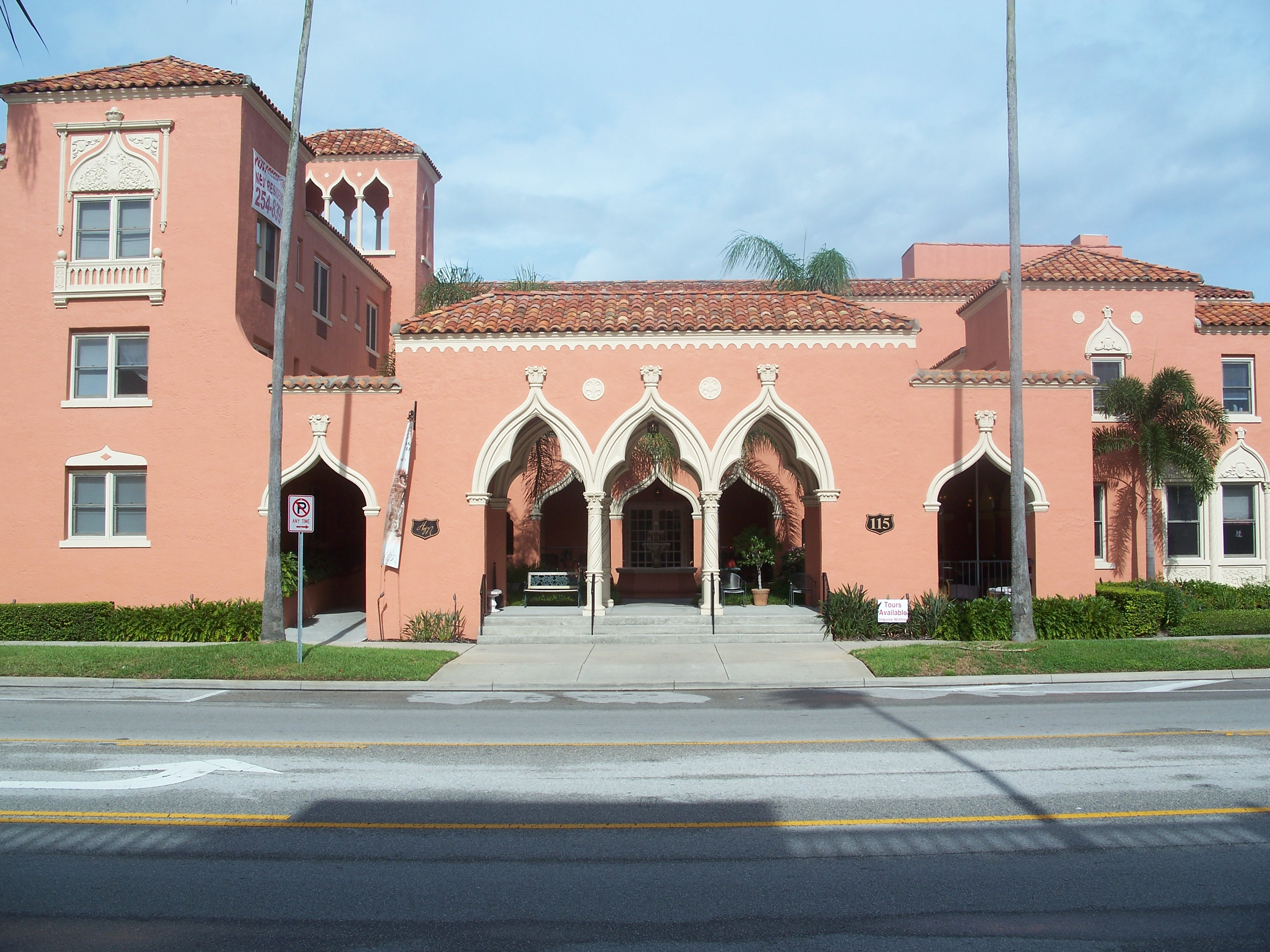

- Location within Florida Location within the United States
- Location: 115 E. Davis Blvd., Tampa, Florida
- Coordinates: 27°55′46″N 82°27′22″W
- Area: less than one acre
- Built: 1926
- MPS: Mediterranean Revival Style Buildings of Davis Islands MPS
- NRHP reference No.: 89000970
- Added to NRHP: August 3, 1989

Currently operated as the Hudson Manor Assisted Living Facility, the Palmerin Hotel (also known as the Davis Islands Motor Hotel or Hudson Manor Assisted Living Facility) was a historic hotel in Tampa, Florida, United States. It is located at 115 East Davis Boulevard. On August 3, 1989, it was added to the U.S. National Register of Historic Places. Today, the former hotel serves as the Hudson Manor Assisted Living Facility for senior citizens and is owned by Liberty Group, the family office of a prominent local family in Tampa Bay.
