= Moses White (activist) =

American civil rights activist (1915–1984)

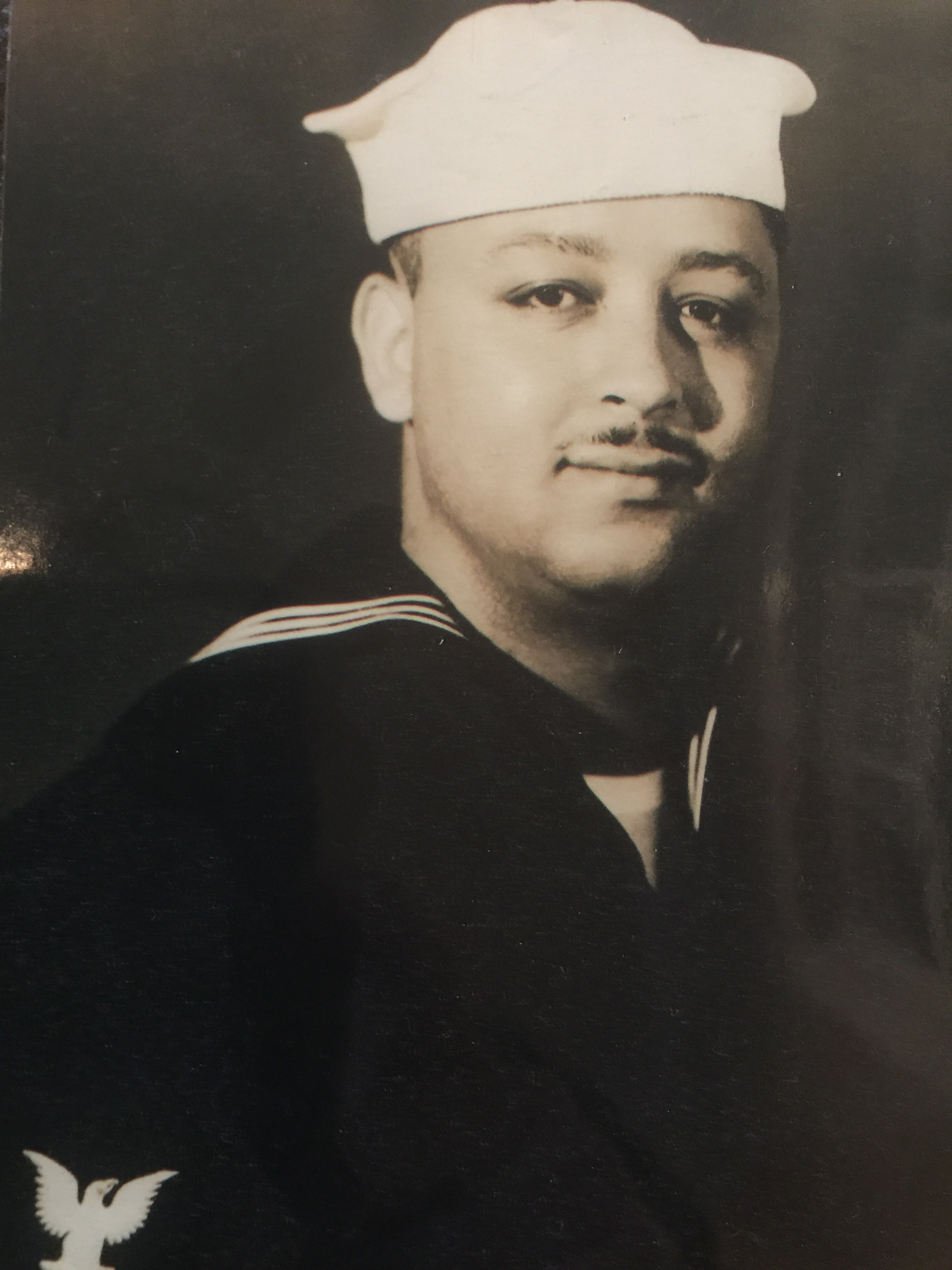

Moses White (March 26, 1915 – March 20, 1984) was an American businessman, civil rights leader, and community advocate for underprivileged communities in Tampa, Florida. He was referred to as the "Mayor of Central Avenue", and a section of Main Street is named for him.

== Biography ==
Born in 1915 in Alapaha, Georgia, his parents were Tom White and Mary Shepard White. He was the seventh of 11 children. He received an education up to the third grade and later served in the United States Navy.

By the 1950s, he owned businesses on Central Avenue and Main Street including the Palm Dinette (Tampa's first sit-down restaurant for people of color), a rooming house, the Deluxe Cozy Corner, and Club Ryals. Known for its BBQ ribs, fried chicken sandwich and yellow rice, the Deluxe Cozy Corner offered three hotdogs for 25 cents and served the local community and military from MacDill Air Force Base.

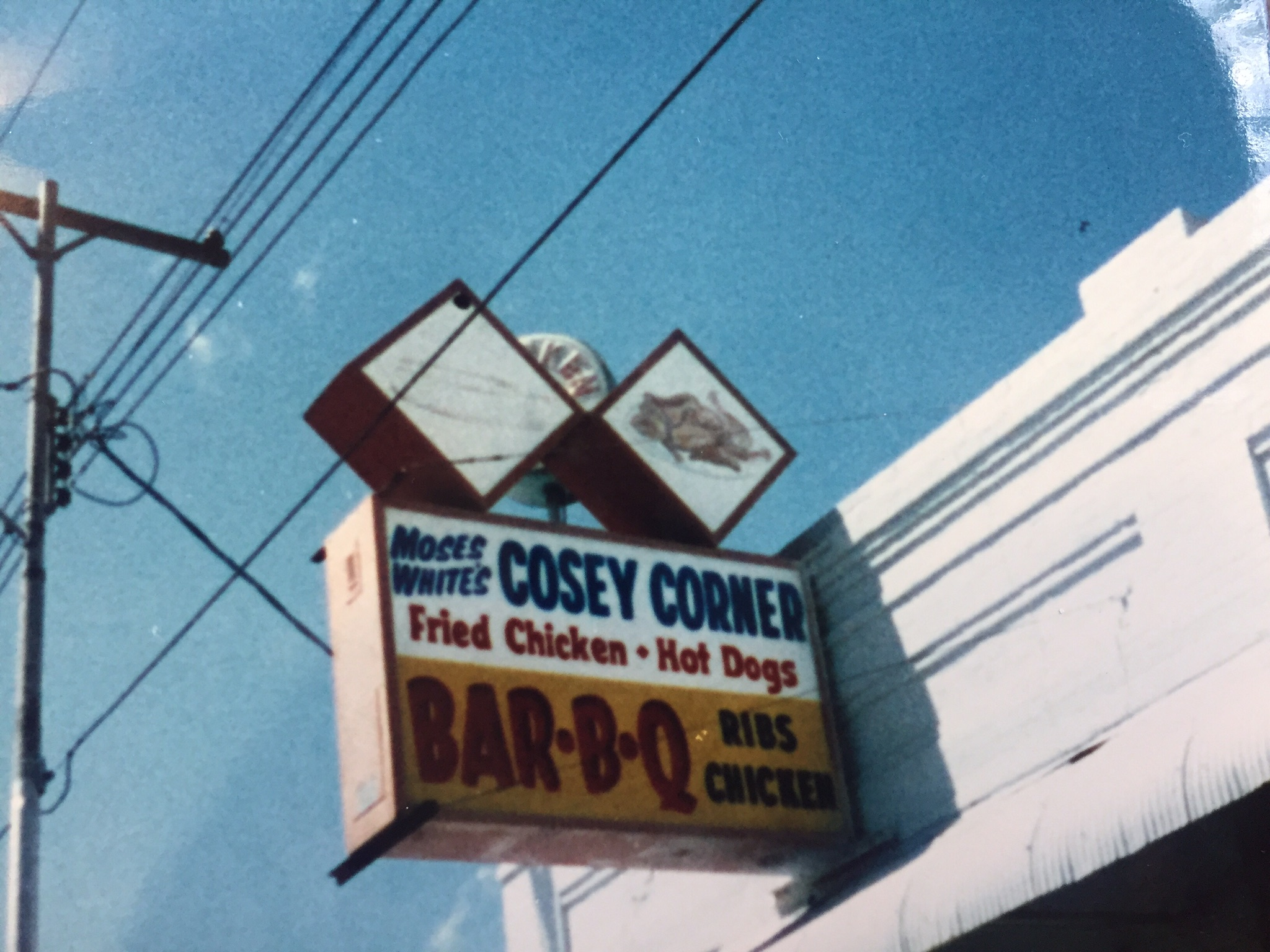

A civil rights leader, Moses' calming nature led to an important role in the 1967 Tampa race riots. He fed first responders and rioters, while calling for peace and facilitating conversations.

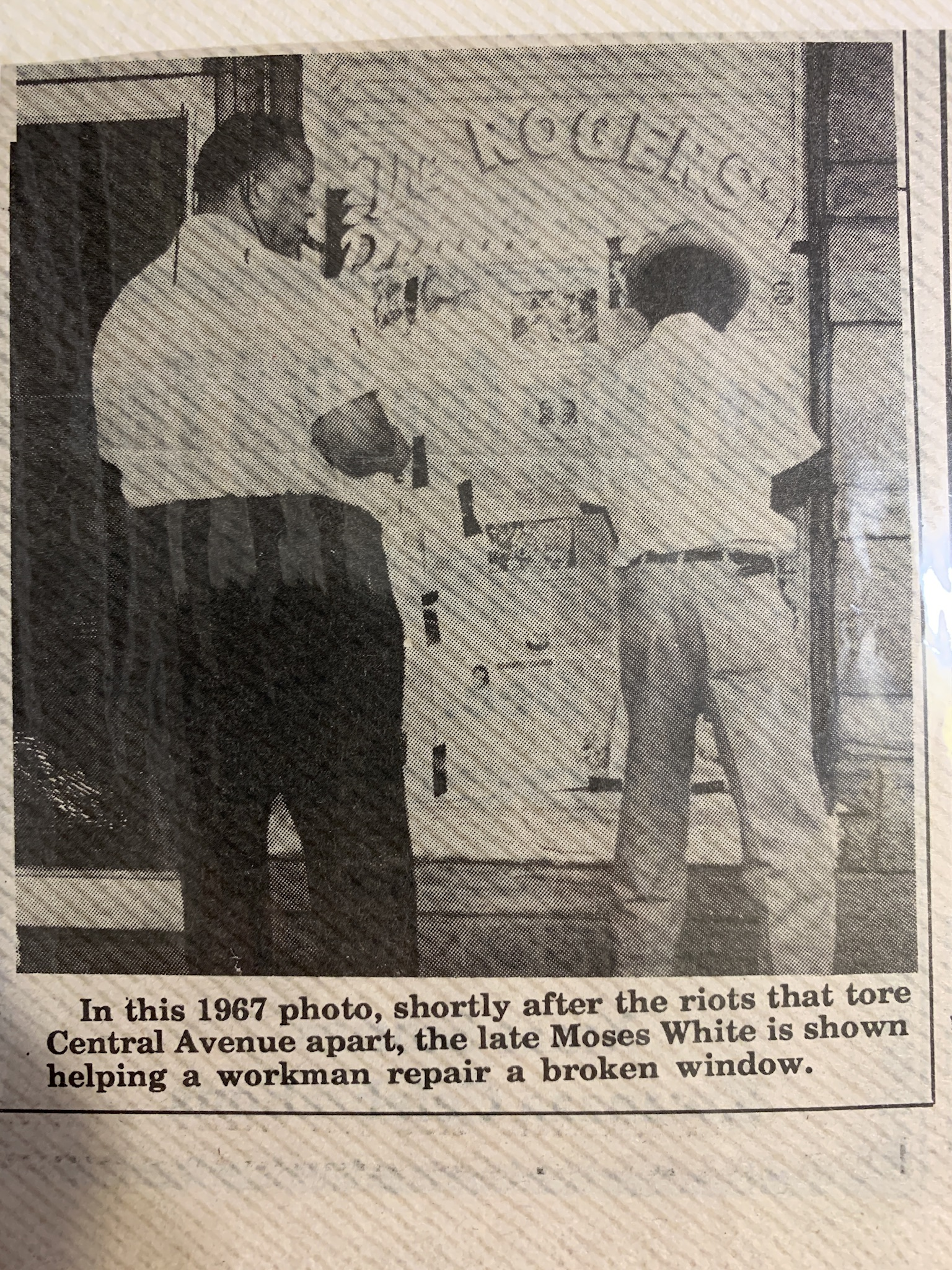

In 1969, Moses worked with famed Coach Jake Gaither of Florida Agricultural & Mechanical University (FAMU) in Tallahassee, Florida, and Coach Fran Curci of the University of Tampa to organize and market the first interracial football game in the Southeast. It was the Pivotal game in the desegregation of college football. Before a sellout crowd of 46,000 fans, FAMU won the game. It pitted the Florida A&M Rattlers, long one of the dominant teams among black colleges, against the Tampa Spartans, a rising power that was overwhelmingly white.

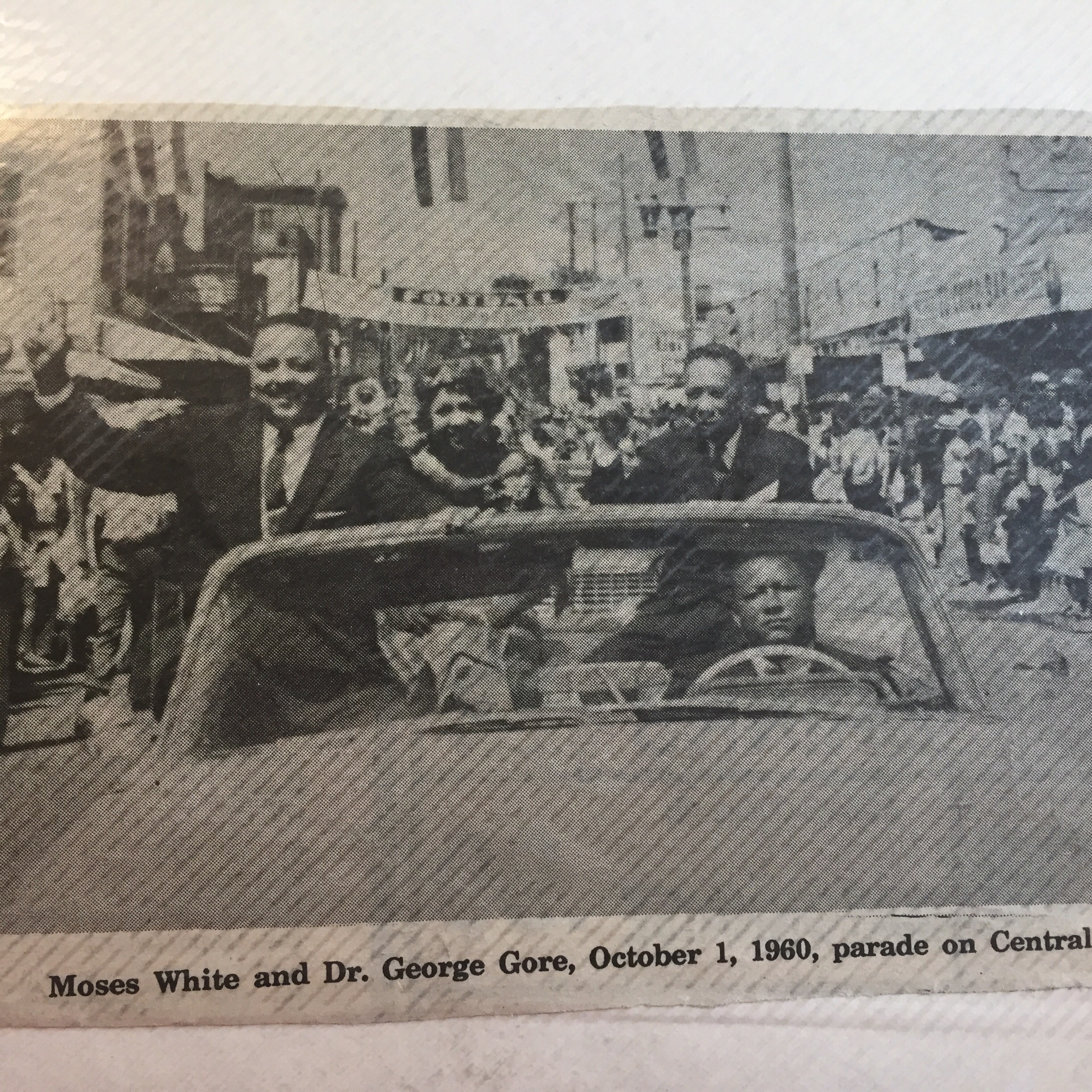

White knew that the success of his community required engagement and advocacy that he could provide. He worked closely with government leaders to build a Veteran's Administration Hospital for Tampa's veterans so that they wouldn't have to travel to St. Petersburg for treatment. He built a sense of community through events such as Easter egg hunts, Thanksgiving turkey giveaways and Christmas food baskets.

White was honored by the Bay Area National Conference of Christians and Jews Brotherhood Awards Dinner in the 1970s community organizing. Following his death, parts of Main Street were renamed Moses White Boulevard in 2001, and an affordable housing development, the Moses White Estates, was named in his honor in 2011.

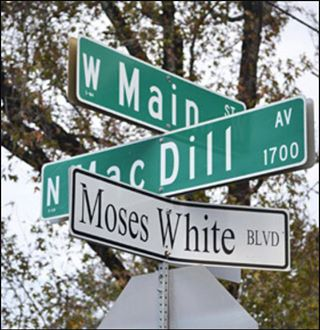

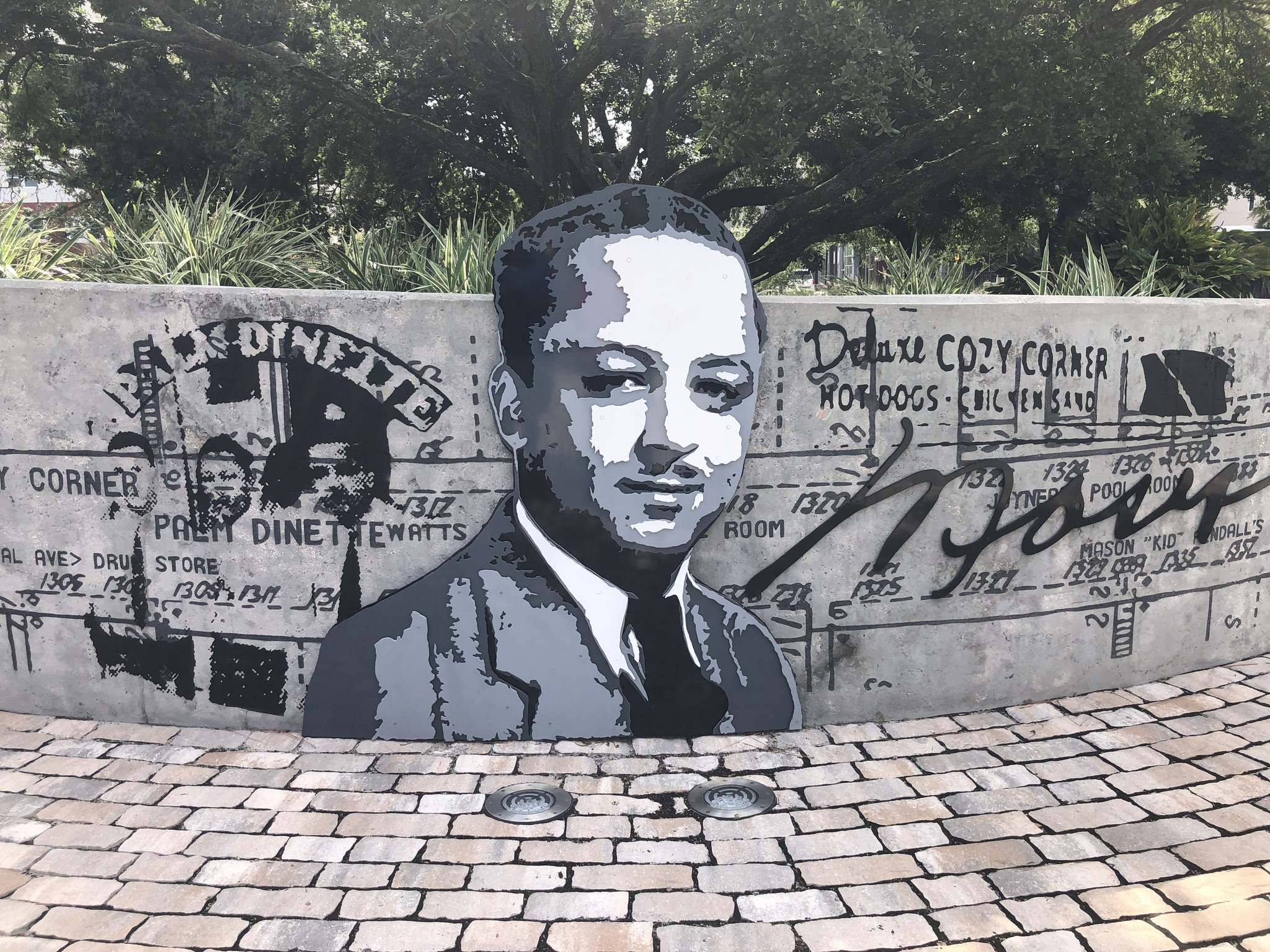

He worked in the community until his death at the James A. Haley Veteran's Administration Hospital in Tampa on March 20, 1984. In 2018, Moses' son Andre Moses White co-founded the Moses White Foundation. The Moses White Foundation was created, in his honor, to support underprivileged populations in Tampa.
