= Garfield Devoe Rogers Sr. =

Personal details
- Born: Garfield Devoe Rogers Sr. Jan 23, 1885; Thomaston, Upson County, Georgia, USA
- Died: February 22, 1951; Tampa

Garfield Devoe Rogers Sr. (1885-1951) was an entrepreneur, community leader and philanthropist in Tampa and Bradenton, Florida.

He founded a life insurance company for blacks during racial segregation in the United States and helped fund the establishment of Rogers Park, Tampa, the first golf course for Tampa's black residents during the segregation era and the second golf course for blacks in Florida after one was established in Miami Gardens.

He obtained his early schooling at Thomaston, Ga., and later took correspondence courses in law and real estate brokerage from Washington and Chicago schools.

He came to Florida from Georgia in 1906 and went to Bradenton where he was engaged in the undertaking business. While there, he was at one time supervisor of black schools of Manatee County.

Coming to Tampa in 1933, Rogers assumed the presidency of the life insurance firm which then had assets of approximately $45,000. Through the years, he built the company to its present-day standing with assets of more than $1,600,000. Rogers took the lead in 1937 to get equal salaries for black teachers of Hillsborough County. He was a motivating force in the acquisition of the property which now houses Don Thompson High School. At the time of his death, he was on the staff of the Southern Regional Council, regional vice president of the National Negro League, on the staff of the National Association for the Advancement of Colored People, the National Urban League, and for many years a director of the Tampa Urban League. For thirty years he served as trustee of the Bethune-Cookman Negro College at Daytona Beach. He was past president of the National Negro Association.

== Legacy ==
On June 7, 1951, the new park built by the City of Tampa Parks Department near Tampa's waterworks on the Hillsborough River was named in his honor. It was dedicated in a ceremony on June 17, 1951.

Rogers Garden Park Apartments, a segregated public housing project built in 1953 on 13th Avenue West between First Street and Ninth Street West, was also named for Rogers Sr. and was known as the Rogers Project. It was eventually demolished and the site is now home to the G.D. Rogers Garden Elementary School. Juneteenth celebrations have taken place on the site to commemorate its history and significance to the black community. It included about 180 2 and 3 bedroom units and was Bradenton’s first public housing. Home to cooks, maids, field workers, and teachers, it was close to Ninth Avenue West, a corridor of black businesses, and the Palms of Bradenton on the other side of First Street was showplace for black entertainers like James Brown and Etta James.

In April 2013 a bust of Rogers was added along the Tampa Riverwalk.
