= Spanishtown Creek =

Stream in Tampa Bay, Florida, US

Coordinates: 27.9369°N 82.4656°W

Spanishtown Creek, sometimes written Spanish Town Creek, was a stream that emptied into the Hillsborough Bay section of Tampa Bay a half-mile west of the Hillsborough River in the area now known as Hyde Park. Spanish-speaking fishermen built a village called Spanishtown near where the creek emptied into the bay during the era of Spanish control of La Florida before Fort Brooke was established. The A historical marker on Bay Street commemorates the history.

Spanishtown is believed to have been established in the mid to late-18th century. Levi Collar, the first known Anglo settler arrived in the area of the Hillsborough River's west bank ca. 1820. Florida was transferred from Spain to the United States in 1821.

The Burgert Brothers photographed a bridge being built over the creek in 1906.
