= Tampa Bay Jewish Film Festival =

The Tampa Bay Jewish Film Festival is an annual event that takes place in Tampa, Florida. In 2006 the festival commenced with a gala which was held on February 8 at the St. Pete Times Forum in order to celebrate the festival's 10th anniversary.
