= W. B. Henderson =

American cattleman and merchant (1839–1909)

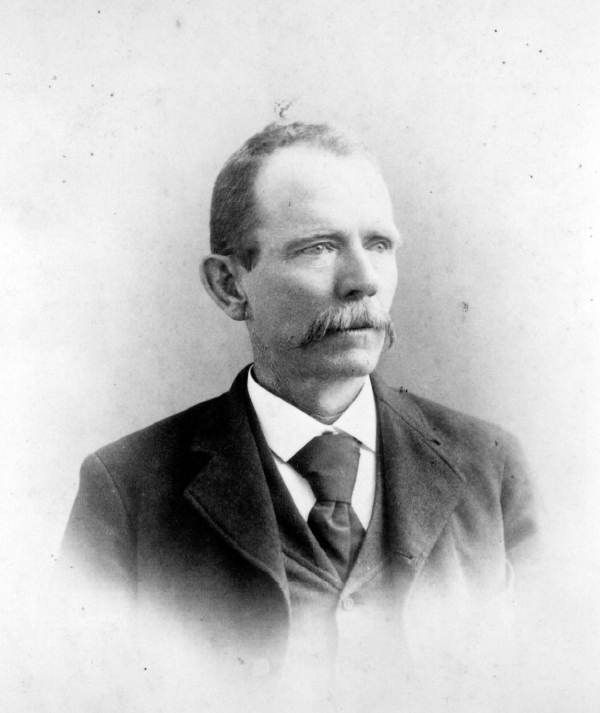
- Henderson, c. 1891
- Born: September 17, 1839; Maysville, Georgia
- Died: May 7, 1909 (aged 69); Dwight, Illinois
- Spouse: Caroline Spencer
- Children: Gettis A. Henderson; Blanche Henderson Weedon; Cora Lee Warren; Fletcher Spencer Henderson; Nellie May Henderson; John William Henderson; Mattie Ward Harris
- Relatives: John A. Henderson (brother)
- Military career
- Allegiance: Confederate States of America
- Branch: Confederate States Army
- Service years: 1862, 1863–1865
- Rank: Lieutenant
- Units: 7th Florida Infantry, Co. B 1st. Special Cavalry Battalion
- Conflicts: American Civil War

William Benton Henderson (September 17, 1839 – May 7, 1909) was a cattleman, merchant, and prominent figure in the history of Tampa, Florida. He is the namesake of Henderson Boulevard and Henderson Avenue as well as the former W. B. Henderson Elementary School.

Henderson served with the Confederacy during the Civil War. His company's captain was James Gettis, who raised Henderson's brothers after the death of his father. He then served in the "Cow Cavalry" and commanded it after John T. Lesley was wounded.

After the war, along with Lesley and James McKay, Henderson shipped cattle to Cuba. He was a member of the firm of Miller & Henderson, then the largest store south of Jacksonville, which housed Tampa's first telegraph.

Henderson was instrumental in bringing cigar manufacturers Gavino Gutierrez, Ignacio Haya, and Vicente Martinez Ybor to Tampa. He also helped establish Giddens Clothing Company, and ran the Tampa Harness and Wagon Company.

He established Tampa Heights, the first suburb in Tampa. He was for ten years president of the State Board of Health. He was a part of the Beckwith, Henderson and Warren real estate agency, and held several pieces of land. He also helped start the Tampa Times newspaper, and was president of the Bank of West Tampa

== Early years ==
Henderson was born on September 17, 1839, in Maysville, Georgia, to Andrew H. Henderson and Floria Olivia McDonald. He arrived in Tampa (then Fort Brooke) in October 1846 with his parents. His father was an Irish farmer and an invalid who lived on the corner of Florida Avenue and Whiting Street.

Henderson attended the first school in Tampa, established by William P. Wilson in September 1848. John T. Lesley also attended. School was cancelled at 10:00 am on the day of the 1848 hurricane, which Henderson recalled made people "hug the ground" in order to move.

Henderson's father died in 1852. In order to support the family, at just 12 years old Henderson took a job at Kennedy & Darling's store, at the corner of Whiting and Tampa streets. His mother died in 1854. He married Caroline Elizabeth Spencer on February 8, 1860. His father-in-law William Spencer was the sheriff of Hillsborough County. Henderson bought a farm on the Alafia River after his marriage.

== Civil War ==
On the eve of the Civil War, on March 9, 1861, a company of cavalry was organized at Alafia with Henderson as captain. In 1862 he enlisted for the Confederacy as a lieutenant in Company B of the 7th Florida Infantry, known as the South Florida Rifles. His captain was James Gettis, who raised his brothers after the death of his father. Gettis was the hero of the Battle of Tampa. Gettis's law partner in Tampa was Henry L. Mitchell, who married Caroline Spencer's sister.

Henderson caught tuberculosis while serving in Kentucky, and was granted a medical discharge. Henderson then reenlisted in Florida's 1st. Special Cavalry Battalion or "Cow Cavalry" and commanded it after John T. Lesley was wounded. His horse "Old Reb" was wounded several times in battle.

== Post-war Tampa ==
In 1866, Henderson opened a general store and sold meat to the Federal troops occupying the garrison.

=== Cattle ===
From 1868 to 1878, during the Cuban insurrection, when cattle was selling at record prices, he and Lesley drove cattle down present-day Henderson Blvd. to Port Tampa and amassed a fortune. He introduced Durham bulls to Florida. He and Lesley also owned a salt factory.

=== Miller & Henderson store ===
In 1873, Henderson established a dry goods store with Norwegian sailor John Miller, then the largest store in the state south of Jacksonville. Henderson ran a steamboat which shipped cattle to Cuba and thereby provided Tampa most of its contact with the outside world. He would also travel to Mobile, Alabama, regularly, carrying such cargo as watermelons and gophers. Henderson also helped start the banana trade with Central America. Miller and Henderson also served as bankers for area cattlemen.

==== Telegraph ====
The first telegrapher in Tampa was Walter Coachman from Jacksonville, with the Tampa and Fort Meade Telegraph Company, whose office was in the store.

==== Cigars ====
Cigar manufacturers Ignacio Haya and Vicente Martinez Ybor had intended to move their business to Galveston. Gavino Gutierrez brought them to Tampa and they visited the store, where they were offered some property by Henderson and W. C. Brown of the Circuit Court. They declined the offer, but it played a role in their moving to Tampa. Brown, Henderson, and A. J. Knight were appointed by the Board of Trade to raise $4,000 to bring the cigar business to Tampa. Without waiting for the $4,000, the cigar plants were completed in Ybor City by 1886.

=== Wagons ===
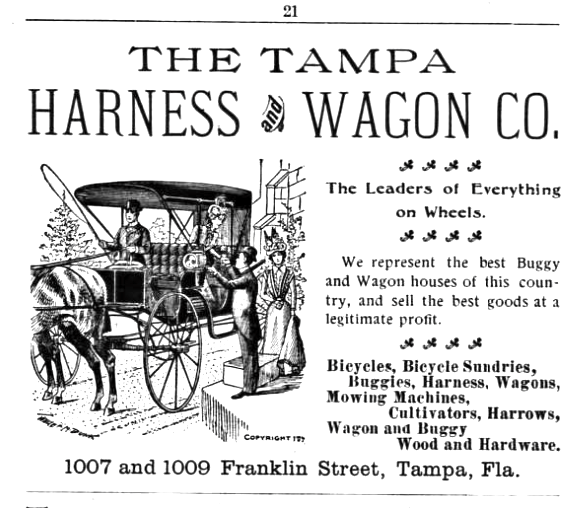
1899 ad

With his wife's cousin John B. Spencer, Henderson founded the Tampa Harness and Wagon Company around 1880.

=== Railroad ===
Tampa's first electric railway, the Tampa Street Railway, was established in 1885 by J. E. Mitchell. Henderson, Lesley, and Brown were all members of the Tampa Street Railway Company.

=== Land ===
In 1881, Brown and Henderson purchased almost all of Depot Key. Henderson bought Weedon Island, Florida, with his war bond in 1886, and gifted it to his daughter Blanche, who married Dr. Leslie Weedon.

=== Fire ===
Henderson was foreman of the first fire fighting group in Tampa, Hook & Ladder Company No. 1, organized in 1884. On May 8, 1886, a fire destroyed all the buildings on the block bounded by Franklin, Whiting, Tampa, and Washington streets, with the exception of the First National Bank. This included the warehouse of Miller & Henderson.

=== Board of Health ===
He was for ten years president of the State Board of Health, and chairman of the Board of County Commissioner. He was a member of the Relief Committee during the yellow fever epidemic of 1887–88.

=== Giddens Store ===
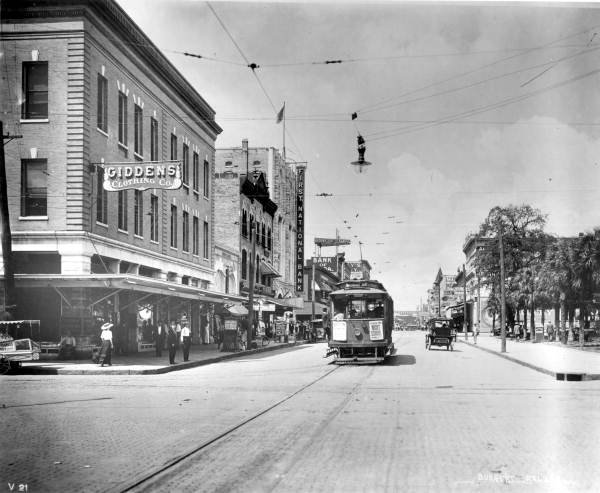
Giddens Corner, 1911

Henderson was a partner of Henry Clay Giddens of the Giddens Clothing Company when it started in 1889, at the corner of Franklin and Lafayette streets.

=== Tampa Heights ===
He established Tampa Heights, the first suburb in Tampa, in 1889. He lived at 212 7th Avenue in Tampa Heights, in a house with a turret.

=== Real estate ===
He was a part of Beckwith, Henderson and Warren real estate agency, working with Beckwith since 1889, and Warren as well since 1899. George Warren married his daughter Cora Lee Henderson.

=== Newspapers ===
Henderson was instrumental in consolidating two newspapers into the Tampa Times. In 1893, he was vice president of the Tampa Publishing Company.

=== Banking ===
Henderson was president of the Bank of West Tampa when it was founded in late 1905, an expansion of the Drew-Henderson-Harris bank. He was also president of the West Tampa Improvement Co., and the Tampa Building and Loan Association.

== Personal ==
He was an active Methodist and Freemason. He took deep interest in politics, but never sought political office.

Henderson died in Dwight, Illinois, where he had gone to recover from a nervous disorder. His funeral was the largest ever in Tampa at the time. He is buried at Oaklawn Cemetery. Rev. W. J. Carpenter noted in his eulogy "No man can write the history of Tampa or of South Florida and leave his name out."

== Books ==
- Grismer, Karl (1950). Tampa (PDF). Archived from the original (PDF) on 2018-11-21.
- Harrison, Charles E. (1915). Genealogical records of the pioneers of Tampa and of some who came after them.
- Isaacs, I. J. (1905). Tampa, Its Industries and Advantages. Archived from the original on 2018-12-15.
- Ivey, Donald J. (1998). The Life and Times of John Thomas Lesley.
- Peeples, Harry A. (1906). Twenty-four Years in Florida. Tribune Printing Co.
- Robinson, Ernest. L (1928). History of Hillsborough County, Florida (PDF). Archived from the original (PDF) on 2016-03-04.
