= Trafficante =

Trafficante may refer to:

- Trafficante crime family, mafia crime family in the state of Florida.
- Santo Trafficante Sr. (1886–1954) Sicilian-born mobster, and father of the powerful mobster Santo Trafficante Jr.
- Santo Trafficante Jr. (1914–1987) Powerful Tampa, Florida-born mobster, son of mobster Santo Trafficante Sr.

== See also ==
- James Traficant (1941–2014), U.S. Representative from Ohio
