= Bolita =

Type of lottery

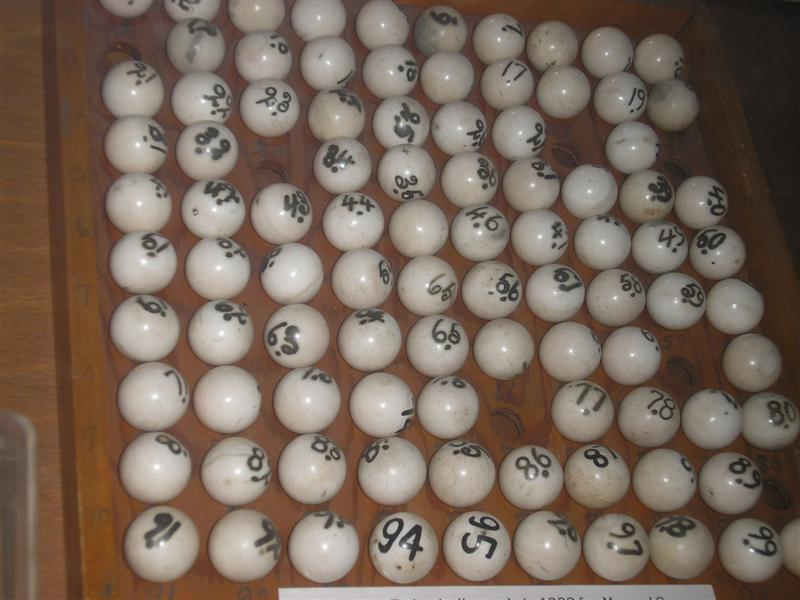
A set of bolita balls on display at the Ybor City State Park Museum, Ybor City

Bolita (Spanish for Little Ball) is a type of lottery which was popular in the latter 19th and early 20th centuries in Cuba and among Florida's working class Hispanic, Italian, and black population. In the basic bolita game, 100 small numbered balls are placed into a bag and mixed thoroughly, and bets are taken on which number will be drawn. Many variations on this theme were created. Bets were typically very small and sometimes sold well in advance, and the game could be rigged, by having extra balls of a given number or not including others at all. Other means of cheating included having certain balls filled with lead so they would sink to the bottom of the bag, or putting certain balls in ice beforehand so they would be cold and therefore easy for the selector to find by touch. Over time, Hispanics developed a name for each number in a system called La Charada or Las Charadas, creating a superstitious method for interpreting game outcomes or placing bets, many times in accordance with one's dreams the previous night.

Today Bolita is played in the United States, among Cuban, Dominican and Puerto Rican groups.

== History ==
Bolita was brought to Tampa, Florida, in the 1880s, and flourished in Ybor City's many Latin saloons. Though the game was illegal in Florida, thousands of dollars in bribes to politicians and law enforcement officials kept the game running out in the open. The alleged king of bolita in the 1920s was Tampa native, Charlie Wall. During the late 1920s, a turf war began between Wall and Italian gangster Ignacio Antinori, who fought each other for control of the numbers rackets in the Tampa area. By the 1930s, Ignacio Antinori and Charlie Wall were in a bloody war for ten years, which would later be known as "Era of Blood". Wall's closest associate, Evaristo "Tito" Rubio was shot on his porch on March 8, 1938. Eddie Virella, "Tito's" former partner at the Lincoln Club, was shot down by gunmen little more than a year before, on 31 January 1937. The war ended in the 1940s with Ignacio Antinori being shot and killed with a sawed-off shotgun. Later, Italian mafiosi Santo Trafficante, Sr. and Santo Trafficante, Jr. also figured prominently in the Florida bolita games. Bolita was widely played in Miami in the middle of the 20th century. In New York, after World War I Casper Holstein was called "Bolita King".

In the 1960s Cuban gangster Jose Miguel Battle Sr., head of the organization The Corporation, met with Tony Salerno of the Genovese crime family. With Salerno's approval Battle set up bolita in the New York City area in exchange for Salerno getting a cut of the profits. He was introduced to Battle via Florida boss Santo Trafficante Jr. He also got approval from Joseph Zicarelli, a capo in the Bonannos, to run bolita in Union City and West New York in New Jersey.

The game has been illegal in Cuba since the Cuban Revolution, but a form of the game based on the results of the Florida Lottery is still played by many Cubans. When played on money bets, it is also illegal in Puerto Rico.

== See also ==
- Florida Lottery
- Jogo do Bicho
- Numbers game
