= John P. Wall =

American physician (1836–1895)

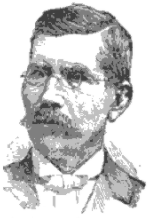

16th Mayor of Tampa, Florida
- In office August 14, 1878 – August 14, 1880
- Preceded by: Thomas Jackson
- Succeeded by: Henry C. Ferris

Personal details
- Born: John Perry Wall; September 1836 Hamilton County, Florida
- Died: April 19, 1895 (aged 58) Gainesville, Florida
- Resting place: Oaklawn Cemetery
- Party: Democratic
- Spouses: Pressie Eubanks (m. 1862; died 1871) Matilda McKay (m. 1872)
- Children: Charlie Wall
- Education: College of Charleston
- Occupation: Physician, politician

John Perry Wall (September 1836 – April 19, 1895) was an American physician, and mayor of Tampa, Florida from 1878 to 1880.

== Biography ==
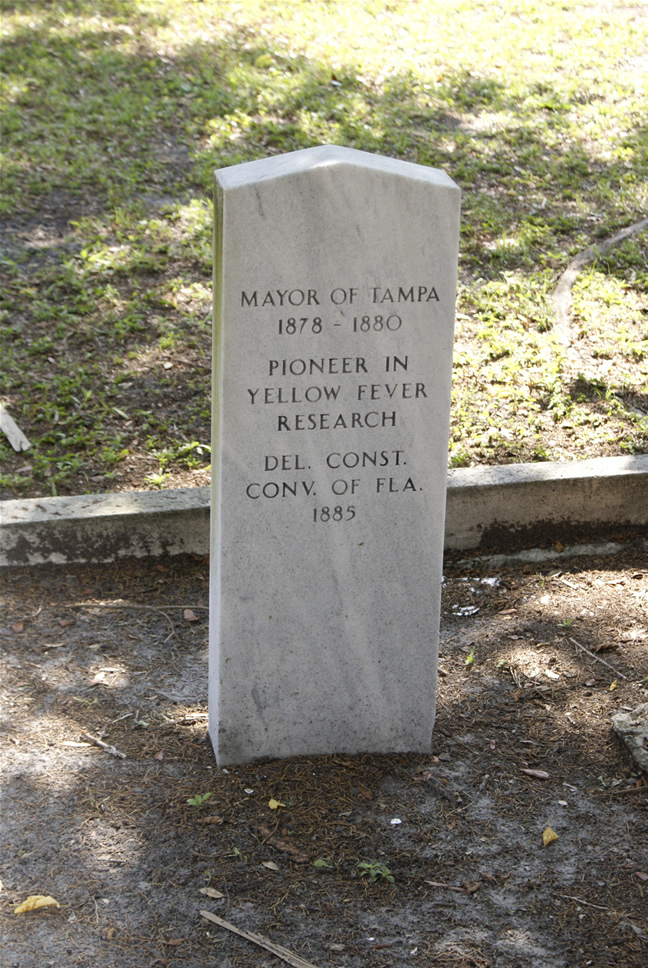
John P. Wall gravesite at Oaklawn Cemetery in downtown Tampa

John P. Wall was born in Hamilton County, Florida in September 1836.

He was educated by private tutors, began the study of medicine in 1855, and graduated from the College of Charleston in 1858.

In 1859 he was a surgeon at Chimborazo Hospital in Virginia, serving Confederate soldiers from Florida during the American Civil War. On a visit to Brooksville, Florida in 1862, he married Pressie Eubanks, the nineteen-year-old daughter of a wealthy planter.

In 1869 he moved to Tampa. In 1871, he contracted yellow fever aboard the steamer H. M. Cool from Cedar Key while treating a cabin boy. He carried the disease to his wife and two-year-old daughter who died within a few days. He devoted his medical career to studying yellow fever and communicable diseases. He also became more of an alcoholic. After agreeing to give up alcohol he was allowed to marry Matilda McKay, daughter of Captain James McKay, in 1872. Tampa crime boss and power broker Charlie Wall was their son.

Dr. Wall lived on the site of the Tampa Federal Savings and Loan Bank building. As mayor from 1878 to 1880, he worked to increase maritime trade. He founded the Tampa Board of Trade and the Tampa Chamber of Commerce, serving as its first president. He helped lead construction of the railroad from northeastern Florida to Tampa, the settlement of Vicente Martinez Ybor and a large colony of Cuban and Spanish cigar makers in what is now part of Ybor City, and helped establish the phosphate industry. He was a delegate at the Florida Constitutional Convention of 1885.

John Perry Wall died from heart failure in Gainesville on April 18, 1895. He is buried at the Oaklawn Cemetery in downtown Tampa.

== See also ==
- List of mayors of Tampa, Florida
