= Trafficante crime family =

Crime family based in Tampa, Florida

- Founded: c. 1920; 106 years ago
- Founder: Ignacio Antinori
- Named after: Santo Trafficante Sr.
- Founding location: Tampa, Florida, United States
- Years active: c. 1920–present
- Territory: Primarily the Tampa Bay area, with additional territory throughout Florida, as well as Havana
- Ethnicity: Italians as "made men" and other ethnicities as associates
- Activities: Racketeering, gambling, bookmaking, loansharking, extortion, labor racketeering, corruption, drug trafficking, hijacking, fencing, skimming, money laundering, bribery, prostitution, kidnapping, assault, and murder
- Allies: Bonanno crime family; Chicago Outfit; Dallas crime family; Gambino crime family; Genovese crime family; Lucchese crime family; New Orleans crime family; Pittsburgh crime family
- Rivals: Various gangs in the Tampa area

The Trafficante crime family, also known as the Tampa crime family or the Tampa Mafia, is an Italian American Mafia crime family based in Tampa, Florida. The most notable boss of the family was Santo Trafficante Jr., who ruled Tampa and the crime family with an iron fist. Author Scott Deitche reported that Santo Jr. was involved with the Central Intelligence Agency (CIA) to plot assassination attempts on Cuban leader Fidel Castro. After the death of Santo Jr. in 1987, the Tampa Mafia family had been controlled by Vincent LoScalzo until his death in 2025.

== History ==
=== Early underworld bosses in Tampa ===
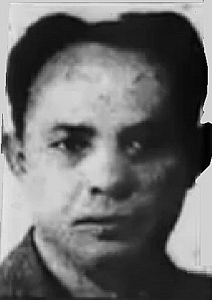
Ignacio Antinori

During the early 1920s, Charlie Wall created an organized crime syndicate in Tampa, where he controlled a large number of illegal gambling rackets and corrupted many Tampa government officials through bribery. Wall controlled his organization from the Tampa neighborhood of Ybor City, and employed Italians, Cubans and men of other ethnicities in his organization. His only rival for criminal rackets in the Tampa Bay area was Italian Mafia boss Ignacio Antinori.

Ignacio Antinori, a Sicilian-born immigrant, became a well-known drug kingpin and the Italian crime boss during the late 1920s. But there was also a smaller independent Italian gang led by Santo Trafficante Sr. that was operating in the Tampa area. Trafficante had lived in Tampa since the age of 18, and had already set up Bolita games throughout the city and was becoming a powerful mobster. Antinori took notice of Santo Trafficante and invited him into his organization and together they expanded the Bolita games across the state of Florida.

By the 1930s, Antinori and Wall were in a bloody decade-long war, which would later be known as "Era of Blood". On March 8, 1938, Wall's closest associate, Evaristo "Tito" Rubio, was shot on his porch. The war between the two continued on for years, until October 23, 1940, when Ignacio Antinori was shot and killed by a shotgun blast to the head at the Palm Garden Inn in Tampa. In 1943, Antinori's two sons, Paul and Joseph, were convicted in Kansas City for drug dealing and sentenced to four years in prison finally ending the decade long war. Both Wall's and Antinori's organizations were weakened, leaving Santo Trafficante as one of the last and most powerful bosses in Tampa.

=== Trafficante Sr. and the casinos in Cuba ===
By the early 1940s, Santo Trafficante Sr. had taken over most of the organized crime activities in the city and started teaching his son Santo Trafficante Jr. how to run these criminal operations. Trafficante Sr. became a successful Tampa cigar factory owner. During the late 1940s, Trafficante Sr. came under constant police surveillance and attempted to avoid the unwanted attention by making Salvatore "Red" Italiano his acting boss.

In 1950, Senator Kefauver began an investigation into organized crime, founding what would become known as the Kefauver Committee. The Committee called on Tampa mobster Charlie Wall to testify about organized crime in Tampa and Florida as a whole. To avoid testifying, both Trafficante Sr. and his son fled to Cuba. Trafficante Sr. had always wanted to enlarge his illegal activities in Cuba and dispatched his son, Santo Jr., to Havana in 1946 to help operate a mob-owned casino. The Tampa mob made a considerable amount of money in Cuba, but never achieved its ambition of making the island part of its territory. After the hearings ended, the Trafficante's returned to Tampa to find out that Italiano had fled to Mexico, leaving Jimmy Lumia the biggest mobster in the city. Santo Sr. had Lumia killed after finding out that Lumia had disparaged him while he was in Cuba. With Lumia eliminated, Trafficante was once again the primary organized crime figure in Tampa.

In 1953 Santo Jr. survived a shooting. The family suspected the perpetrator was Charlie Wall and had him killed in 1955. Trafficante remained the boss of Tampa until he died of natural causes in 1954.

=== Trafficante Jr. era ===
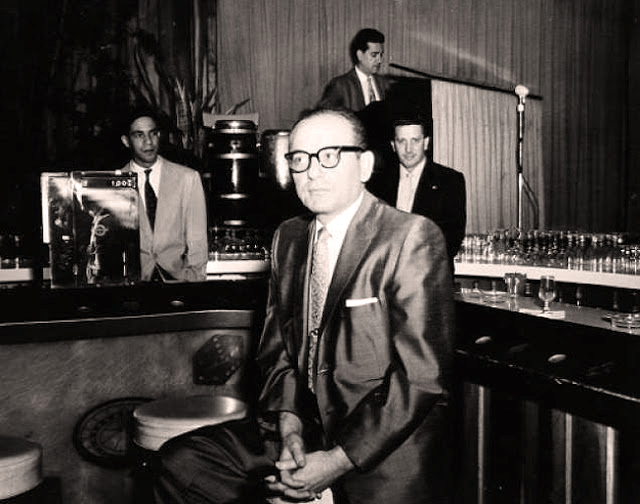
Santo Trafficante at Sans Souci Cabaret, 1955

Santo Trafficante Jr. was born in the United States on November 15, 1914, as one of five sons of Mafia boss Santo Trafficante. Santo Jr. succeeded his father as the boss of Tampa upon his death. Despite numerous unrealized ambitions, he was regarded as one of the most powerful mob bosses of the American Mafia and ruled his family with an iron fist. During the 1950s, Trafficante Jr. maintained a narcotic trafficking network with Tommy Lucchese, the boss of the Lucchese crime family in New York City. Trafficante Jr. had known Lucchese since the 1940s, when his father and Lucchese had trained him in the Mafia traditions. Trafficante Jr. would frequently meet with Lucchese in New York City for dinner. Trafficante also entered into an agreement with Pittsburgh crime family boss John LaRocca to jointly control the Sans Souci casino in Havana.

Trafficante partnered with the Corsican mafia in drug trafficking in Cuba. Paul Mondoloni, Trafficante, and Norman Rothman, are reported to have moved between 50 and 150kg of heroin every three to six months from Cuba to the United States. Cuban dictator Batista was paid off $20,000 per week to facilitate this. Previously Trafficante's father Santo Trafficante Sr., had reached his own arrangement with Senator Francisco Prío, brother of Cuban prime minister Carlos Prío Socarrás, and Cuban Senator Indalecio Pertierra, to traffic drugs through Cuba to America.

Santo Jr. was deeply involved in the Central Intelligence Agency (CIA) efforts to involve the underworld in assassination attempts on Cuban head of state Fidel Castro. Under pressure of a court order granting him immunity from prosecution, but threatening him with contempt if he refused to talk, Trafficante admitted to a Congressional committee in 1975 that he had in the early 1960s recruited other mobsters to assassinate Castro. "It was like World War II" he told the committee. "They told me to go to the draft board and sign up."

In 1978, Trafficante was called to testify before the United States House Select Committee on Assassinations investigating possible links between Lee Harvey Oswald and anti-Castro Cubans, including the theory that Castro had President John F. Kennedy killed in retaliation for the CIA's attempts to assassinate Castro.

Santo Jr. never spent a day in jail, and he died of natural causes in March 1987.

=== Leadership under LoScalzo ===
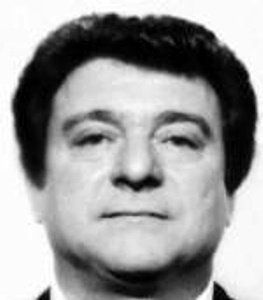
Vincent LoScalzo

In 1987, Vincent LoScalzo became boss of the Trafficante family and Florida was declared an open territory, meaning that the Five Families of New York City could operate in any city in Florida. LoScalzo controlled a much smaller family, as over the years many of the older mobsters retired or died and few were replaced with new members. As the new boss LoScalzo maintained control of criminal interests in illegal gambling, prostitution, narcotics, union racketeering, hijacking and fencing stolen goods. He also controlled a few bars, lounges, restaurants, night clubs and liquor stores across Florida. Loscalzo maintained ties to Mafia families in California, New Jersey, and New York as well as being connected to the Sicilian Mafia.

LoScalzo sought to increase the already close ties between his family and the New Orleans crime family in Louisiana. He used Joseph Campisi of Dallas, who was close with both families, to this end, and was seen in the company of New Orleans underboss Joseph Marcello on multiple occasions.

As boss LoScalzo inducted a group of new members that included Joseph DiGerlando, James J. Valenti and Salvatore Carollo which would focus on white-collar fraud. On July 1, 1989, LoScalzo was indicted on racketeering charges, including grand theft. The charges were later dropped and then reinstated. LoScalzo pleaded no contest on October 7, 1997, and received three months of probation. In 1992, LoScalzo was arrested at the Tampa International Airport for carrying a loaded .38-caliber pistol in his briefcase after it was detected by an X-ray scanner. He later convicted in 1999 and was sentenced to 60 days in prison.

In 1992, LoScalzo along with Frank Albano, Santo Jose Trafficante and James Donofrio were under investigation for money laundering, bank fraud, wire fraud and a host of other financial crimes with Key Bank. The Key Bank investigation and case was dismissed from court, but LoScalzo was again arrested and charged with a different fraud case. He pled no contest and received three years' probation.

On October 26, 2000, federal authorities arrested Steven Raffa, along with eighteen members of Trafficante family's Miami faction. Raffa, the leader of the family’s Miami faction, committed suicide on November 16, 2000.

=== Current status ===
It was reported on November 25, 2007, Vincent LoScalzo was in his 70's and considered a semi-retired mobster and just a "regular Joe" according to Scott Deitche, author of Cigar City Mafia. The old family membership has died and the Tampa Mob has fallen into the shadows of the New York mobs.

On August 5, 2008, the Tampa and New York FBI indicted John A. "Junior" Gotti, along with John A. Burke, James V. Cadicamo, David D'Arpino, Michael D. Finnerty and Guy T. Peden on charges of racketeering, kidnapping, conspiracy to commit murder and drug trafficking. The indictment stated that Gotti Jr. along with the other men had been involved in various criminal activities in Tampa and New York during the early 2000s. Evidence from the 2004 and 2006 trials of John Alite, Ronald J. Trucchio, and Charles Carneglia connected Gotti Jr. and others to criminal operations in Tampa, Florida.

On August 19, 2025, longtime family boss Vincent Salvatore LoScalzo died at the age of 88.

== Historical leadership ==
=== Boss ===
- 1920–1940 — Ignacio Antinori — murdered on October 23, 1940.
- 1940–1954 — Santo Trafficante Sr. — died of a heart attack on August 11, 1954
- 1954–1987 — Santo Trafficante Jr. — died of a heart attack on March 17, 1987
- 1987–2025 — Vincent "Vince" LoScalzo — died on August 19, 2025

=== Underboss ===
- 1920–1940 — Santo Trafficante Sr. — promoted to boss
- 1946–1948 — Salvatore "Red" Italiano — The nephew of former boss Ignazio Italiano, he later fled to Mexico.
- 1948–1950 — James "Head of the Elks" Lumia — murdered on June 5, 1950.
- 1950–1954 — Santo Trafficante Jr. — promoted to boss
- 1970s–1987 — Vincent "Vince" LoScalzo — promoted to boss
- 1987–1994 — Frank "Daddy Frank" Diecidue — died on October 19, 1994
- 1994–present — Frank Albano

== Current members ==
=== Administration ===
- Boss – Unknown
- Underboss – Frank Albano – born in 1939, Albano became the underboss in 1994 after the death of Frank Diecidue.

=== Soldiers ===
- Antonio Amorelli
- Joseph DiGerlando – former developer
- John "Big John" Mamone (born on June 12, 1951) – current soldier. Mamone was born in Hudson County, New Jersey, and his family hailed from Calabria. By 1981, Mamone married Anna Grace Dolce in New Jersey. In the 1980s, Mamone was associated with the New York based Genovese family, and was heavily involved in illegal gambling and within the trucking industry, alongside Genovese family associate, George Weingartner. Prior to Mamone's transfer to the Florida family, he was associated with Genovese family capo, Angelo Prisco, and was a close associate of Paul "Doc" Gaccione, an associate of the Genovese family, including visiting Gaccione when he was imprisoned at FCI Danbury during the late 1980s. By the early 1990s, Mamone and Gaccione were involved in labor racketeering connected to construction projects, including the assault of contractor, Stanley Betts, in March 1990, in relation to construction kickbacks. In December 1991, Mamone was arrested for intimidation and was later acquitted. By 1992 or 1993, Mamone relocated to Coral Springs in Broward County and transferred to the Florida family. In February 1993, Mamone established a company in the trucking industry named Gateway Freight Systems. In around 1993 or 1994, Mamone was inducted as a soldier into the Florida-Trafficante family, and was assigned to the crew headed by Steve Bruno Raffa. In August 1993, Mamone was arrested for insurance and mail fraud, and Mamone was later arrested by the New Jersey State Police in October 1994 for terror threats, theft, extortion, bribery, witness tampering and racketeering, a month after he was released on bail. By 1995, Mamone was heavily involved in loansharking, illegal gambling, fraud, stolen property and money laundering, Mamone was involved with several affiliates of the Florida family engaging in these crimes, and was also associated with Gambino family associate, Julius Chiusano, Genovese family associate, Israel "Buddy" Torres, and Bonanno family associate, Frederick Scarola. In March 1995, Mamone pled guilty to fraud and was sentenced to 4 years of probation and was fined $95,000 in restitution. By the mid-1990s, Mamone was involved in marijuana trafficking with Joseph Russo Jr. and David Tobin, and was using his business, the Gateway Transport, for interstate cannabis trafficking. In January 1999, Al Polito was indebted to Mamone for the sum of $40,000, Polito later became an FBI cooperator. In October 2000, Mamone was indicted for racketeering and was released on bond in November 2000. In September 2002, Mamone was sentenced to 9 years in prison for fraud and narcotics trafficking, and was incarcerated at FCI Marianna by 2004 before he was transferred to FCI Fairton by August 2006. In September 2021, Mamone was indicted for fraud and he had pled guilty in February 2022, and at trial, it was alleged Mamone was associated with Colombo family member, Thomas Farese, during the time of the crimes.

=== Associates ===
- Michael R. Napoli

== Former members ==
- Joseph Antinori – former soldier. Born in 1909. On November 4, 1953, he was shot and killed inside of a tavern in Tampa, Florida. His father, Ignazio Antinori, was a member of the Trafficante family, and he was also gunned down, in October 1940.
- Sam Cacciatore – former soldier. Born in 1916 or 1917. Cacciatore was the cousin to Santo Trafficante Sr., and was the son to Joseph "Jo-Jo" Cacciatore, also a Trafficante soldier who died in 1967. Cacciatore died in 1981.
- Salvatore "Sam" Carollo – born in Caccamo, Sicily and later grew up in Chicago to finally living in Florida. Carollo became a real estate developer in Florida and eventually owned a golf course. In 1991, Carollo was identified as a “made man” in a report from the Florida Department of Law Enforcement. In 1994, Carollo and boss Vince LoSacalzo were arrested on racketeering and fraud charges. On December 29, 2020, Carollo died of natural causes.
- Santo Carollo – former soldier
- Frank "Daddy Frank" Diecidue – former soldier. Born in 1915. Diecidue was identified as a member of the Trafficante family by a US senate investigation in 1965. In 1976, he was among seven defendants convicted of killing a Tampa Police detective, and was released in 1979. He died in October 1994.
- James W. Donofrio – former member and old-time loan shark. Donofrio owned Rio Liquors chain. In 1932, he was arrested on charges of attempted robbery, homicide, assault, weapons charges and tax fraud. In 1992, he was among the 39 people who were investigated during the Key Bank case but wasn't charged. Donofrio died in May 2001 of died of heart failure at the age of 90.
- Frank "Cowboy" Ippolito – born in April 1921, in Tampa, Florida. Ippolito reportedly served as a soldier for the Trafficante crime family, allegedly inducted in 1988. Ippolito was also a restaurant owner in the Ybor City area named the La Tropicana Restaurant. Ippolito was allegedly a partner with Henry Trafficante in a bookmaking operation. It is noted his son, Frank Ippolito Jr., was shot and killed during an attempted armored car robbery. Ippolito died in April 2008 at the age of 87.
- Ignazio Italiano – was a friend of Profaci family boss Joseph Profaci. They were from the same town of Villabate in Sicily. Ignazio was a produce salesman and the uncle to Tampa mobster Salvatore "Red" Italiano. He died on August 11, 1930.
- Augustine "Primo" Lazzara – born in September 1906, in Tampa, Florida. Lazzara was a capo for the Trafficante crime family, reportedly heavily involved in illegal gambling. Lazzara died in April 1968 at the age of 61.
- Vincent LoScalzo – was considered "boss" of the family since the late 1980s, born in 1937 in Sicily. The LoScalzo family moved from Sicily to New Orleans and finally to Tampa. During the 1980s, LoScalzo increased his property holdings in West Tampa and Ybor City. He operated from Brother's Lounge on West Kennedy Boulevard and other Tampa bars. Trafficante family.
- James Costa "Jimmy" Longo – former capo. Born in 1910. During his early criminal career, he allegedly served as a bodyguard and enforcer to Trafficante Jr. and was assigned to look after the family's interests in Cuba. Longo died in June 1992.
- Salvatore "Silent Sam" Lorenzo – former soldier. Born in 1927. Lorenzo was identified as a member of the Trafficante family in 1977. He died in 1995.
- Phillip "Phil" Piazza - former capo. Born in January 1903 in Sicily. Piazza's sister was married to Salvatore Italiano, the underboss to Trafficante Sr., Piazza's nephew was also married to Maria LoScalzo, who was the sister of current Trafficante family boss Vincent LoScalzo. In 1965, the US government identified Piazza as a member of the Trafficante family. He died in January 1977.
- Steven Bruno Raffa – former leader of Trafficante family's Miami faction and close associate of boss Vincent LoScalzo. Raffa took control of the family's Miami faction during the mid 1980's and operated from his base in Opa-Locka, Miami and Pembrooke Pines. During the 1990s, Raffa worked with Genovese family's New Jersey faction mobster John Mamone, who began living in Pompano Beach. Raffa along with Mamone controlled a multi-million dollar money laundering operation using a network of mob owned check-cashing stores in South Florida. Raffa was arrested on October 26, 2000, along with eighteen members of his crew. He later committed suicide on November 16, 2000.
- James "Jimmy" Valenti — former soldier. Valenti was inducted into the family during the late 1980s by boss Vincent LoScalzo. Valenti was a former protégé of capo Francis "Daddy Frank" Diecidue, and was also affiliated with soldier Louis "Lou" Caggiano. He was observed meeting with LoScalzo at his Mahalo Auto Sales shop on FBI surveillance logs from the 1990s. For 40 years, he worked at Southern Glazer's Wine and Spirits, eventually becoming the company's vice president and general sales manager before retiring in 2001. Valenti died on March 18, 2022.
- Santo Jose Trafficante – former member and nephew of former boss Santo Trafficante Jr. Died July 13, 2010.

== Former associates ==
- Frank Ragano – was the attorney and main advisor to Santo Trafficante Jr.

== List of murders committed by the Trafficante crime family ==
Name	Date	Reason
Norris McFall	October 10, 1928	McFall served as a police officer. McFall was possibly killed for a personal dispute with Charlie Wall.
Angelo Lazzara	July 27, 1931	It is believed Lazzara was killed as it was discovered that he was undercover and was informing on the Trafficante family.
Joseph "Giuseppe" Vaglica	July 10–11, 1937	Vaglica was born in Palermo, Italy in June 1893. According to law enforcement, Vaglica was killed as part of a gangland war between Charlie Wall and the Sicilian Mafia.
Mario Perla	October 12, 1939	Perla was killed as a victim of the 'Bolita War' between Charlie Wall and Ignacio Antinori.
Ignacio Antinori	October 22, 1940	Antinori was killed by a shotgun blast, losing the 'Bolita War' to Charlie Hall.
Jimmy Velasco	December 12, 1948	Velasco served as the political fixer for the Trafficante family. He was shot to death located at 20th Street between Fourth and Fifth Avenues in Ybor City. It is believed Velasco was killed as the administration of the Trafficante family grew paranoia of Velasco possibly seizing control of the crime family.
Jimmy Lumia	June 5, 1950	According to law enforcement, Lumia was closely associated with Salvatore "Red" Italiano, whom was the underboss of the Trafficante family during the late 1940s. It is believed Santo Trafficante Sr. had ordered a contract on Lumia as paranoia revolving around Lumia seizing control of the crime family, and was shot to death by a shotgun blast.
Angelo Giglio	September 22, 1952	Giglio was shot and killed by using a 12-gauge shotgun located at a construction site at 3523 W. Hillsborough Ave in Tampa whilst discussing Trafficante family gambling operations, by an unknown assailant as he was deemed to be on bad terms with the crime family.
Joseph Antinori	November 4, 1953	Antinori was the son of Trafficante family soldier, Ignazio Antinori, whom was murdered in October 1940. In 1943, Antinori was sentenced to serve a 5-year prison sentence for transporting morphine and heroin from Cuba, and he had established a legal business involving distributing juke boxes at the time of his death. Antinori had survived a previous assassination attempt on his life in August 1953. Antinori was shot 3 or 4 times at the Boston Bar, located at 22nd Street and Columbus Drive.
Charlie "The Dean" Wall	April 18, 1955	Wall was beaten with a baseball bat and stabbed 10 times in the chest with his throat slit ear-to-ear at the age of 75 as he had orchestrated an unsuccessful murder attempt on Santo Trafficante, Jr.
Richard Lee Cloud	October 23, 1975	Cloud had served as a Tampa police officer, and it is believed he was shot and killed at his home as a result of investigating organized crime and drug dealing within the Florida area.
Bum Farto	February 16, 1976	Farto had served as the Fire Chief of Key West, Florida. It is believed Farto was murdered while awaiting sentencing for a drug trafficking conviction, and that he was killed to possibly prevent him for informing on a Trafficante family member.

== In popular culture ==
- Newell, Mike. Donnie Brasco (1997). A Hollywood film about former FBI agent Joseph Pistone. Val Avery played Santo Trafficante Jr.
- Poulette, Michel. Bonanno: A Godfather's Story (1999). A made-for-television film about the rise and fall of the Bonanno crime family. The actor John Burns played the part of Mafia boss Santo Trafficante Jr.
- Guzzo, Pete. Ghost of Ybor (2008). A made-for-television film about the life of the American gangster Charlie Wall. It shows the Trafficante crime family at the end of the film.

== See also ==
- Crime in Florida
- List of Italian Mafia crime families
