= Charlie Wall =

American businessman and mobster (1880–1955)

- Born: Charles McKay Wall; March 10, 1880; Tampa, Florida, U.S.
- Died: April 18, 1955 (aged 75); Tampa, Florida, U.S.
- Cause of death: Beaten and bludgeoned to death
- Other name: "The Dean of The Underworld"
- Occupations: Racketeer, political figure, money launderer, mafia associate
- Parent: John P. Wall (father)

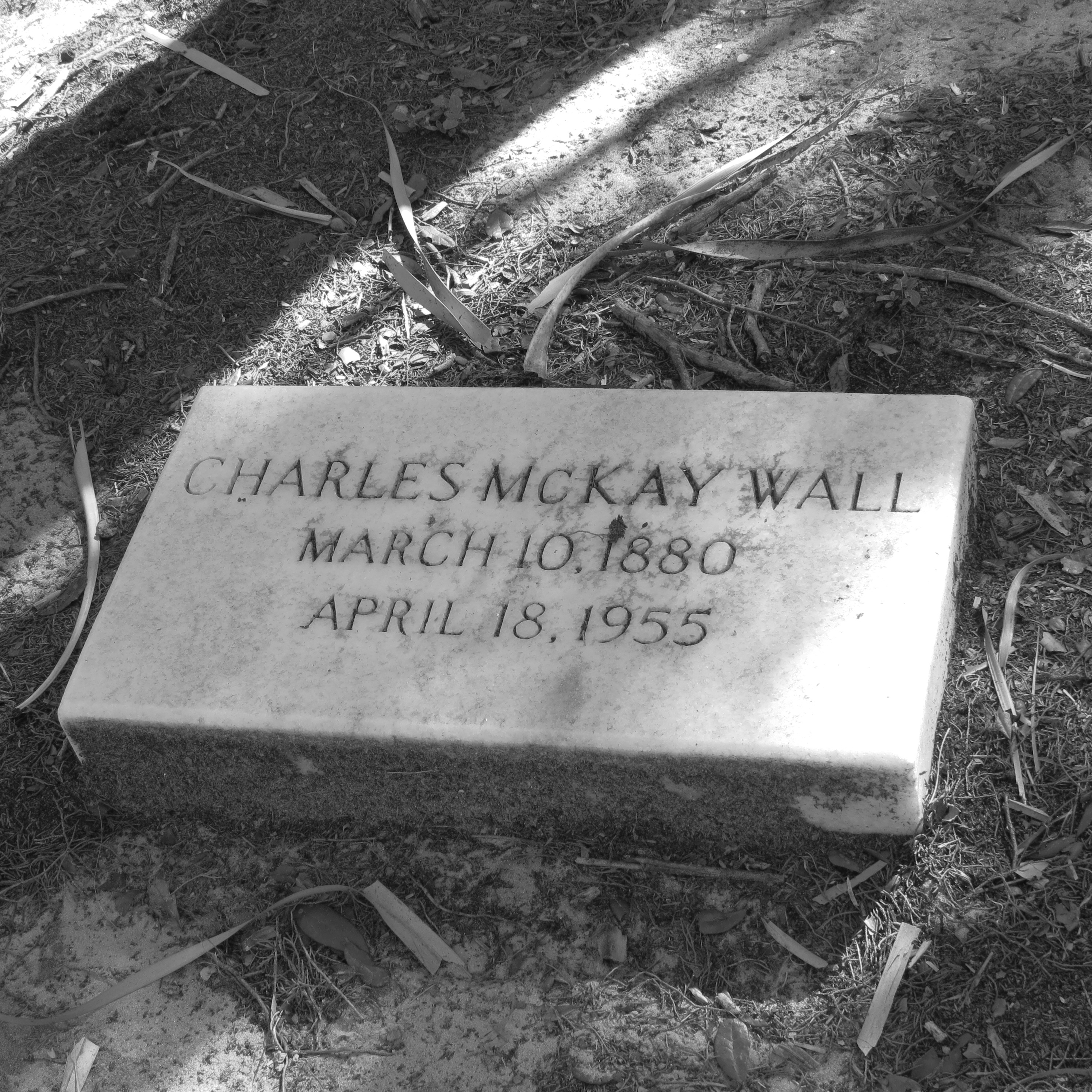
Charlie Wall was the son of John P. Wall. He was Tampa's first well known crime boss, and rivaled the Trafficante Family. He was bludgeoned to death in his Ybor City, Tampa, home and had his throat slit as a result. Known as "The White Shadow".

Charles McKay Wall (March 10, 1880 – April 18, 1955) was an American businessman, mobster, and political figure who was a rival to reputed mobsters Santo Trafficante Sr. and Santo Trafficante Jr. His parents were John Perry Wall and Matilda McKay, daughter of former Tampa Mayor. Wall rapidly gained status within the criminal underworld from his early endeavors in the operation of several gambling, prostitution, and illegal numbers rackets. He was beaten with a baseball bat, his throat slit and killed, on April 18, 1955. He was buried in Tampa's Oaklawn Cemetery.

== Early life ==
Charles McKay Wall was born on March 10, 1880, in Tampa, Florida, to John Perry Wall, a local physician and former mayor of the city, and Matilda McKay Wall, a daughter of the prominent McKay family. He was allegedly abused by his stepmother, and Wall developed mental health issues. There was an unverified and inaccurate rumor that he shot his stepmother, the third wife of his father. On June 19, 1895, he got into a row with the old family cook, and shot her in the head with a revolver. She sustained a minor fleshy wound, and Charlie was arrested and locked up. He was sent to military school, despite showing promise as a student. He was expelled from the school, due to visiting a brothel. He was arrested several times in 1905 for fighting, using abusive and profane language, and running a gambling house.

== Crime boss of Ybor City ==
The young Charlie spent much of his formative years, frequenting the gambling dens of Tampa and, at some point, he took over the city's criminal and political underworld.

Wall ran Tampa from the Ybor City neighborhood and employed Italians, Cubans and Irish into his organization. His closest associate was Evaristo "Tito" Rubio, a Cuban mobster and co-owner of the El Dorado Club. Additionally, Wall was prominently involved in organized corruption of judges, politicians and other government officials, facing little opposition from the law or other criminals.

== Turf wars and death ==
During the late 1920s, a turf war began between Wall and Ignacio Antinori. They fought each other, as well as the Trafficantes, for control of the numbers rackets in the Tampa area.

By the 1930s, Ignacio Antinori and Charlie Wall were in a bloody war for ten years, which would later be known as "Era of Blood". Eddie Virella, Rubio's former partner at the Lincoln Club, was gunned down on 31 January 1937, and Rubio himself was killed by a gunman while on the porch of his home on March 8, 1938.

The feud between Wall and Antinori came to a head between factions of Antinori Gang, dissatisfied members of Chicago and St. Louis criminal outfits to whom Antinori was supplying narcotics, and Wall's organization. On the morning of October 23, 1940, Antinori was shot dead by two gunmen while sipping his morning coffee at a local restaurant. Wall himself had seen an attempt on his life go awry earlier that spring, possibly by some members of Antinori's outfit or even by some in Antinori's ties to St. Louis mobster Thomas Buffa and/or Kansas City mobsters Nicolo Impostato, James DeSimone and Joseph Deluca.

Charlie Wall supposedly retired from the rackets in the late 1940 but was nevertheless brutally murdered in his home on April 18, 1955. Though the case was never solved, the murder may have been ordered by Santo Trafficante Jr. after his father died (of natural causes) in 1954, removing Wall's promise of protection.

== In popular culture ==
The account and rise and fall of Wall was depicted in the 2008 documentary film The Ghosts of Ybor: Charlie Wall which starred actors John A. Schakel as Wall, Gene Siudut as Joe Bedami, Chris Pardal as Johnny "Scarface" Rivera, and Rod Grant as the lead detective in the Wall murder investigation.
