= John A. Henderson =

American politician and lawyer (1841–1904)

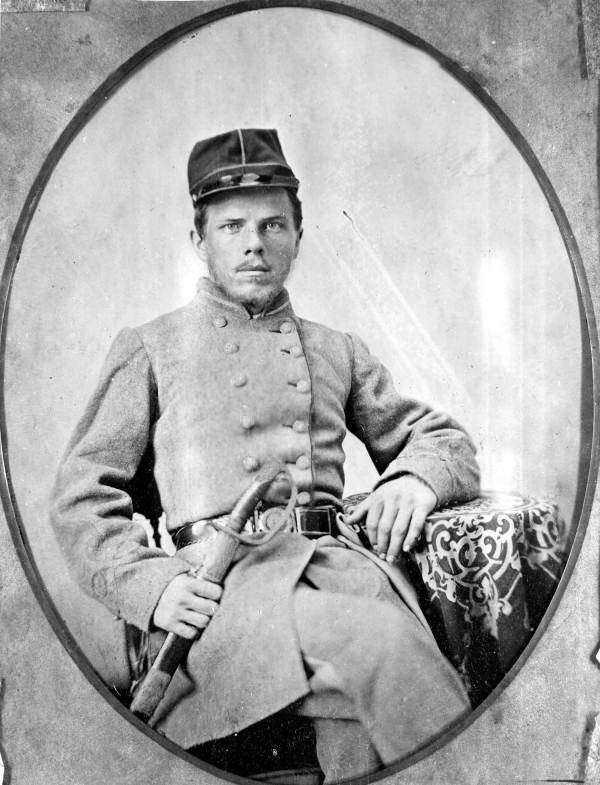

Mayor of Tampa

Personal details
- Born: December 21, 1841 Clarke County, Georgia
- Died: August 10, 1904 (aged 62) Tallahassee, Florida
- Party: Democratic
- Spouse(s): Mary Turman; Mattie Ward
- Relations: W. B. Henderson (brother)
- Children: Flora Waldo; John Ward Henderson; Mary Henderson; Jennie Murphree
- Occupation: Lawyer

Military service
- Branch/service: Confederate States Army
- Years of service: 1862
- Rank: 2nd Lieutenant
- Unit: 7th Florida Infantry, Co. B
- Battles/wars: American Civil War

John Alexander Henderson (December 21, 1841 – August 10, 1904) was a corporate lawyer and politician in Florida. He was an early resident of Tampa, the brother of William Benton Henderson. He studied law under James Gettis, who raised him after the death of his father. During the Civil War, Henderson was in Gettis's company, Company B of the 7th Florida Infantry. He was elected mayor of Tampa in 1870.

In 1876, he moved to Tallahassee. His second wife was the daughter of G. T. Ward. He served as general consul for the Florida Central & Peninsular Railroad Company. He was a trustee of the West Florida Seminary, and his daughter Jennie married Albert A. Murphree. He taught law to William Himes. He was a state senator. William D. Bloxham appointed him a US Senator when Wilkinson Call's term expired.
