= L'Unione Italiana =

Coordinates: 27.9601°N 82.4394°W

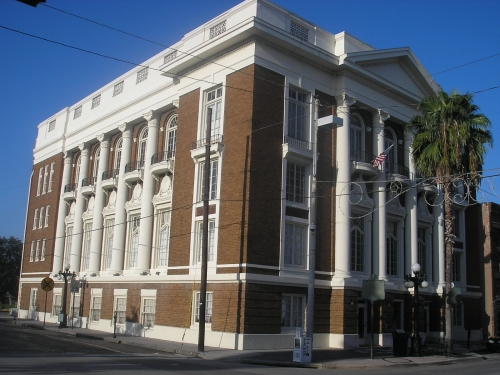
L'Unione Italiana (The Italian Club) in Ybor

L'Unione Italiana, (also known as The Italian Club), is a historic social society in Tampa's Ybor City neighborhood. The group's building was designed by Tampa architect M. Leo Elliott. It is located at 1731 East Seventh Avenue.

== History ==
Originally founded as a mutual-aid society for Italian members in 1894 predominantly serving Italian immigrants, membership in the Italian Club grew from 107 members at founding to over 3,000 members by 1935. The society's first president was Bartolomeo Filogamo. The original building, built in 1911, burned down in 1914. An entirely new building was constructed on East 7th Avenue in Tampa's Ybor City, completed in 1918 and is still standing. Club membership entitled members to health insurance, including sick and death benefits for members. The club owned a cemetery and instituted Sicilian burial customs, and imported cypress trees and also featured headstones with photos and Italian and Sicilian scripts. The club building also served as a community and social space for its members, where the men would often play games, drink, read, and watch live performances.

In the 1930s and 1940s, the Italian Club also housed a movie theater called the Broadway Theatre.

Santo Trafficante Sr. was a member of L'Unione Italiana, and he was buried in L'Unione Italiana Cemetery, which the Italian Club purchased and dedicated at its founding in 1894.

On December 9, 2018 the Italian Club celebrated the 100th anniversary of the building.

On November 5, 2022, former Italian Club president Jamie Granell was awarded the Palo Longo Award; the award highlights an individual’s commitment to spend their lives perpetuating Italian traditions and heritage and helping pass down those traditions for future generations.

The building today is often rented out for private events.

== Architecture ==
The Italian Club building was built in a Renaissance Revival style. It features Corinthian columns and decorative marble elements. It stands three-stories tall and like many other buildings in Ybor City, utilizes redbrick construction. The third floor has small balconies with railings. The building featured a cantina, bowling alley, library, dance floor, a theatre, and other recreational spaces.

== Festa Italiana ==
Held each spring within weeks of Easter Sunday, Festa Italiana is a weekend of events, wine tastings, bocce ball tournaments, and celebrations celebrating Italian culture and heritage in Tampa Bay.

== See also ==
- Circulo Cubano de Tampa (Cuban Club)
- Centro Asturiano de Tampa (Asturian Spanish Club)
