= James Gettis =

American politician (1816–1867)

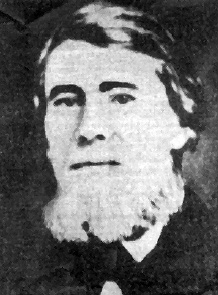
- Born: May 4, 1816; Pennsylvania
- Died: December 14, 1867 (aged 51); Tampa, Florida
- Occupations: Lawyer, judge
- Military career
- Allegiance: Confederate States of America
- Branch: Confederate States Army
- Service years: 1862–1863
- Rank: Captain
- Units: 7th Florida Infantry, Co. B
- Conflicts: American Civil War: Battle of Tampa

James Gettis (May 4, 1816 – December 14, 1867) was a lawyer and judge in Tampa, Florida. He was the second lawyer in Tampa. Gettis was also a city councilman, and state representative, and the first town clerk.

Originally from Pennsylvania, Gettis came to Tampa in 1848. He promoted the development of Tampa and sought to bring rail service to the area.

An ardent Confederate secessionist during the Civil War, he attended Florida's Secession Convention and signed the Ordinance of Secession, and was the hero of the Battle of Tampa.

== Lawyer and judge ==
He was the second lawyer admitted to the bar in Tampa, on October 24, 1848, and tutored other law students, including John A. Henderson and Henry L. Mitchell. James McKay Sr. was one of his clients. His law office was on Franklin Street.

In 1865, Gettis was appointed Circuit and Probate judge.

== Civil War ==
Though he held no slaves, Gettis was a pro-slavery secessionist and was one of two delegates from Hillsborough County to vote for secession when the Convention met in January 1861.

He served in the Confederate Army during the Civil War for a brief period, as captain of the 7th Florida Infantry, Company B, the "South Florida Rifles". Gettis was singled out for his bravery by Captain John William Pearson during the Battle of Tampa. He received a medical discharge and returned to Tampa due to ill health, inflicted with "incipient phthisis and chronic diarrhoea". Just before his discharge, he organized the Tampa City Guards.

== Personal ==
He was a Master Mason and a member of the American Party. He had no children, but raised the brothers of W. B. Henderson after the death of Henderson's father. In his will, Gettis left all his property to James F. Henderson. He is buried in Oaklawn Cemetery in downtown Tampa.
