= James C. Field =

American photographer

James Cooley Field was a commercial photographer in Tampa, Florida He is buried at Oaklawn Cemetery in downtown Tampa.

Field moved to Tampa hoping that the climate would help cure his wife, Nannie, who had tuberculosis. She died of the disease, and her daughter Alice Maud died soon after. The name of Field's company, Field & Morast, appears on many of early photographs of Tampa. Field sold his business to his partner in 1897 and moved to Six Mile Creek where he became a saloon operator. He was arrested for selling liquor without a license in 1899.
