= Battle of Tampa =

Battle of the American Civil War

Coordinates: 27.9415°N 82.4559°W

- Part of American Civil War
Date	June 30, 1862 – July 1, 1862
Location	Tampa, Florida
Result	Confederate victory

Belligerents
United States (Union)	(Confederate States of America) CSA (Confederacy)

Commanders and leaders
A.J. Drake	John William Pearson

Units involved
U.S.S. Sagamore	Ocklawaha Rangers

Strength
1 gunboat	1 company

Casualties and losses
0	0

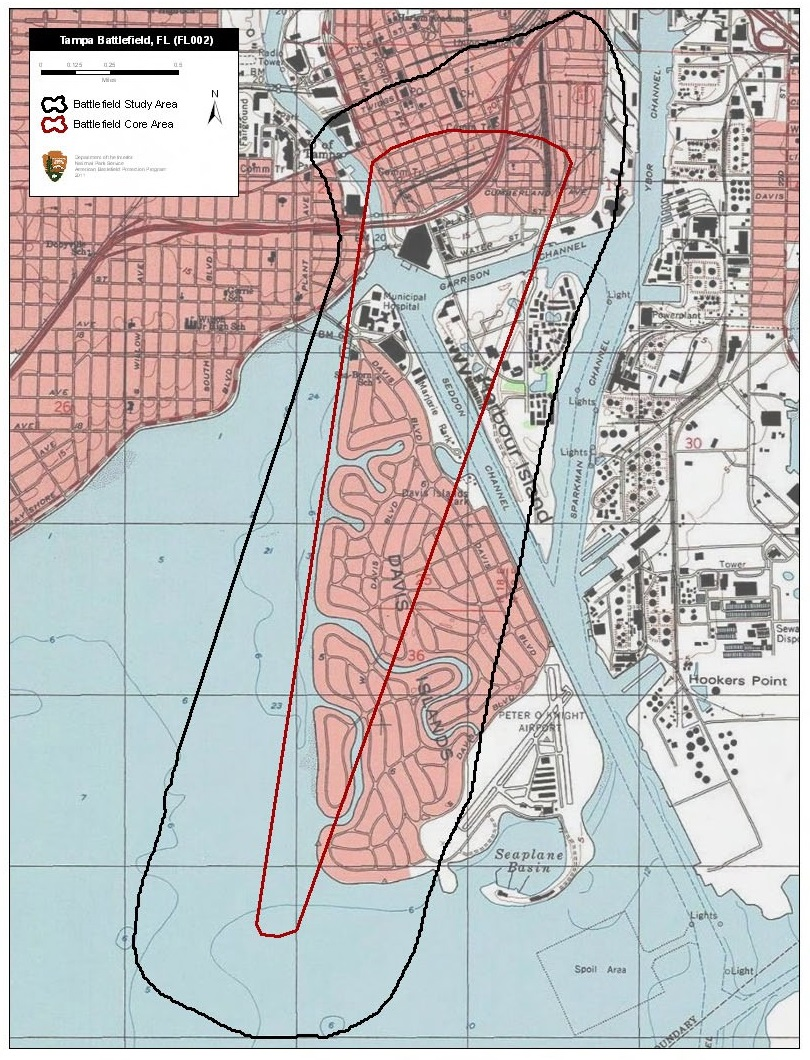
Map of Tampa Battlefield core and study areas by the American Battlefield Protection Program.

The Battle of Tampa, also known as the "Yankee Outrage at Tampa", was a minor engagement of the American Civil War fought June 30 – July 1, 1862, between the United States Navy and a Confederate artillery company charged with "protecting" the village of Tampa, Florida. Although small, Tampa's port was a key hub of trade for Central Florida, and several blockade runners from Tampa regularly slipped past the Union naval blockade that extended down the Atlantic coast around to Florida's west coast.

On June 30, 1862, the Union gunboat USS Sagamore steamed into Tampa Bay to demand the surrender of the small Confederate (CSA) garrison at Fort Brooke. This demand was rebuffed by Captain John William Pearson, to which Captain A.J. Drake of the Sagamore responded with a warning that his ship would open fire at 6:00 p.m. that same day. The gunboat began a long-range bombardment of the fort and town that evening as scheduled, to which the fort responded by returning fire with its three larger canons. Neither side inflicted real damage or suffered any casualties, and after firing several more rounds the next morning from beyond the range of the fort's guns, the Sagamore returned to its blockade station near the mouth of Tampa Bay.

Later, more aggressive Union attacks resulted in the destruction of several moored blockade runners during the Battle of Fort Brooke in October 1862 and a brief occupation of Fort Brooke by Union forces in May 1864.

== Background ==
On April 13, 1862, at 11 a.m., the alarm went up when a Union schooner anchored behind an island two miles from Tampa. Confederate pickets were posted on all the roads into town to sound the alarm because it was feared the ship was a decoy. According to the diary of Robert Watson, a member of the “Key West Avengers” (Captain H. Mulrennan's company of Florida volunteers), “[W]e are of opinion that the Yankees have landed men below us and came in the schooner to draw our attention while they march up in our rear.” After an hour the schooner launched a boat under a flag of truce. It was met by two Confederate boats. The Federals demanded the surrender of Tampa. According to Watson, “Major Thomas told them that he would not surrender it. The Yankee officer then gave him twenty-four hours to take the women and children out of the town as they would attack the place at the end of that time. Our men gave three cheers at the prospect of having a fight which made the men in the Yankee boat look down in the mouth as they expected to see us all look frightened and ready to surrender. Capt. Smith told us to take all of our clothing and carry them up the river as the enemy might come too strong for us and should we have to retreat it would be impossible to carry anything with us. A strong picket guard on all day and night.” On April 14 Watson wrote, “No sign of the enemy but there is a bright lookout for them.”

By the summer of 1862, plans were in place in Washington to further tighten this blockade by capturing major ports throughout the Confederacy, à la New Orleans, which was captured in April 1862, as well as other towns along the Mississippi River (most notably Vicksburg). It was common knowledge among the Union's chief military strategists that the sooner the blockade could effectively seal off the Confederacy from any level of commerce, the sooner the import-dependent Confederates would be forced to surrender, lacking the materiel necessary to sustain a war of attrition, as the Union infantry would ultimately have to attempt to put on the Confederacy at various points in the war.

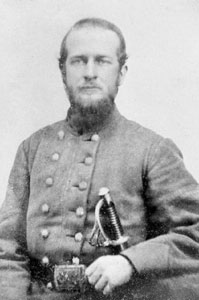
Captain John William Pearson, CSA

== Battle action ==
On June 30, USS Sagamore, a Union gunboat, came into Tampa Bay, opened her ports, and turned her broadside on the town. The gunboat then launched a boat with 20 men flying a flag of truce. In his post-action report, Captain John William Pearson, CSA, reported to Gen. Joseph Finegan, CSA, what transpired. “I immediately manned one of my boats with 18 men met them in the bay, determined that they should not land on my shore, and on meeting the boat the lieutenant in command reported he had been sent by Captain Drake to demand an unconditional surrender of the town. My reply to him was that we did not understand the meaning of the word surrender; there was no such letter in our book; we don’t surrender. He then said they would commence shelling the town at 6 o’clock, and I told him to pitch in. We then gave three hearty cheers for the Southern Confederacy and the Federal boat crew said nothing…. At 6 o’clock they promptly opened fire on us with heavy shell and shot, and after two from them we opened from our batteries, consisting of three 24-pounder cannon. Both parties then kept up a regular fire until 7 p.m.” At that point, U.S.S. Sagamore withdrew. On July 1, between 10 a.m. and 12 p.m., the gunboat fired from beyond the range of the Confederate cannon. After a two-hour break for lunch, USS Sagamore fired two more rounds, weighed anchor, and sailed away. There were no Confederate casualties.

Capt. Pearson's after-action report singled out Capt. James Gettis of Hillsborough County and originally from Pennsylvania for his decisive leadership of one of the Confederate batteries.

== Aftermath ==
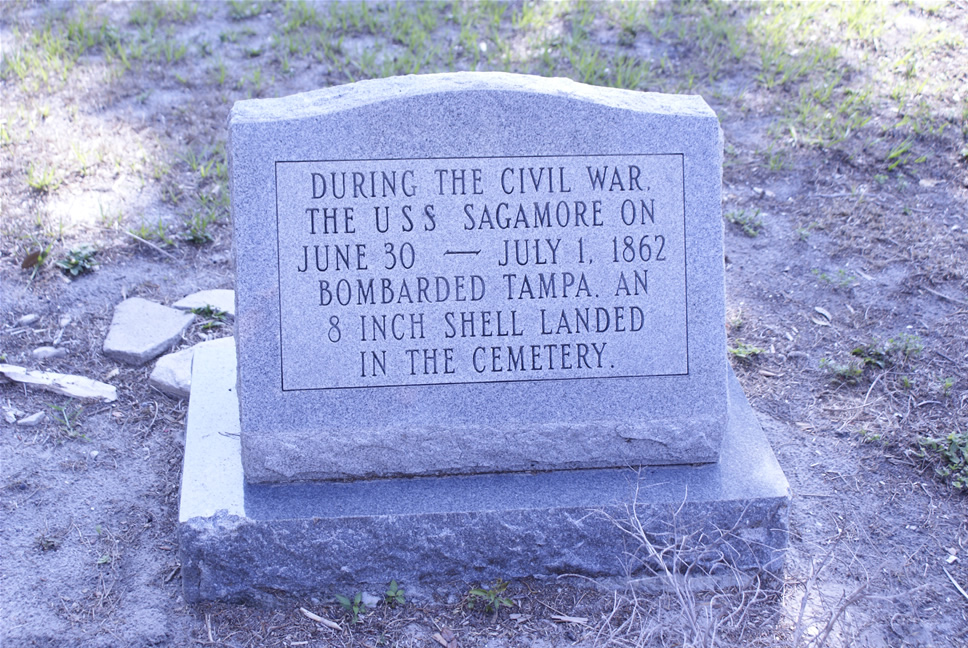
Marker in Oaklawn Cemetery where a shell fell during the Battle of Tampa

The Battle of Fort Brooke was a more significant action fought in Tampa the following October. In this engagement, a Union gunboat again bombarded Fort Brooke while secretly landing a small raiding force. The raiding party was able to find and destroy several Confederate blockade runners hidden up the Hillsborough River before departing.

Union forces returned to Tampa once more in May 1864. By this time, the Confederate war effort was faltering, and Fort Brooke's defenders had been transferred to more pressing stations. Troops from the USS Adela landed in Tampa without opposition, destroyed or took remaining supplies in unoccupied Fort Brooke, and left town after two days. Two cannons from Fort Brooke that were dumped in the Hillsborough River during this raid were found and restored and are now on display in Plant Park on the University of Tampa campus.
