= Nicola Impastato =

Sicilian-American gangster

Nicolo Impastato (January 6, 1906- September 1979), also known as "Nick Tousa", was a Kansas City gangster.

Nicolo Impastato was an admitted member of the Mafia who was born near Palermo, Sicily and became a Mafioso while still in Sicily. He fled to the U.S. in 1927 during Benito Mussolini's campaign to eradicate the Mafia in Sicily. He eventually settled in Kansas City, Missouri, where he was taken in by the local Mafia family which was then headed by Frank "Chee Chee" DeMayo. Impastato reportedly quickly developed mob contacts in several U.S. cities. His brother, Vito Impastato, was also a known Mafia member who resided in Springfield, Illinois.

As a member of the Kansas City Cosa Nostra organization, Impastato became known primarily for his role as a go-between with the KC and Tampa, Florida crime families. He was sent to Tampa in 1939, probably at the behest of KC mob boss Charles Binaggio to coordinate the transfer of heroin between the two cities.

The heroin was smuggled into the country via Cuba after having been shipped there by cargo ship from Italy or France. The heroin originated in the Middle East and Asia. Impastato interacted with the Antinori's, prominent members of the Tampa family, which was led at the time by James Lumia. It was believed that Impastato and his cohort James DeSimone also performed various enforcement tasks for the Tampa family.

In 1941 the KC family reportedly received a shipment of bad heroin from the Antinori's. Kansas City, and the other crime families around the country that had received portions of the bad heroin (KC distributed it to other cities), demanded a refund on their money for the shipment, estimated to have been about $25,000.00 worth. The Antinori's refused and on October 23, 1940 Ignacio Antinori, the patriarch of the family, was killed by a shotgun blast to the head while seated at a table in the Palm Garden Inn in Tampa. His sons, Joe and Paul, continued leading the smuggling ring after his murder.

The downfall of the narcotics ring came in April 1942 when the Bureau of Narcotics received a tip on the Kansas City part of the operation. They conducted raids on a bar at Armour and Troost, and at the residence of Felipo Pernice at 425 S. Montgall in Kansas City, where they seized heroin secreted in coffee bags that had been hidden in a compartment in the basement of the house. Several of the ring's members were rounded up, including Joseph Deluca, a Binaggio lieutenant that was in charge of the KC part of the ring. The Feds scored a break when they managed to "turn" one of the lower level "mules", Carl Caramusa. They also turned Thomas Buffa, a St. Louis mobster involved in the ring. Both Caramusa and Buffa testified in the 1943 trials related to the drug ring. Most of the mobsters charged were convicted, including Impastato, who received a two-year term in Federal prison. The mob didn't forget about Caramusa and Buffa. On June 21, 1945, Caramusa was killed by a shotgun blast while changing a tire on his car in front of his daughter who was seated on the front porch of their new home.

An initial attempt to kill Buffa failed, and he fled the Midwest. In March 1946, he was tracked down and shot to death in Lodi, California. As for Impastato, he was deported back to Sicily following his release from prison. He died in September 1979.
