= Oaklawn Cemetery =

First public burial ground in Tampa, Florida, United States

- U.S. National Register of Historic Places
- U.S. Historic district
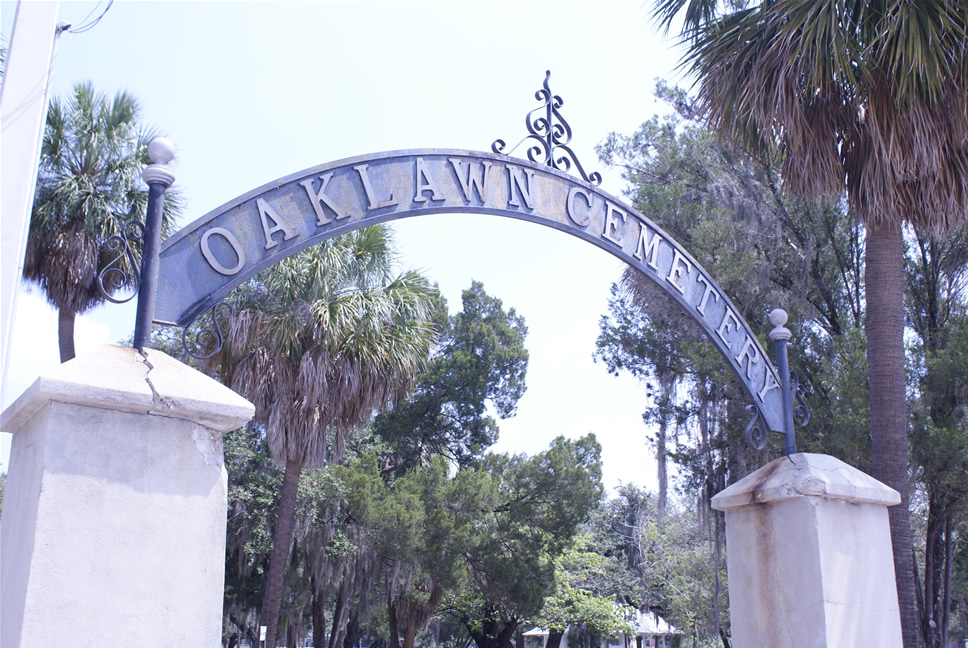
- Harrison St. entrance to Oaklawn Cemetery

- Location within Florida Location within the United States
- Location: Hillsborough County, Florida Tampa, Florida
- Coordinates: 27°57′16.9″N 82°27′26.3″W
- NRHP reference No.: 100001668
- Added to NRHP: September 19, 2017

Oaklawn Cemetery is the first public burial ground in Tampa, Florida, United States. The location was deeded in the mid-19th century and was described as the final resting place for "White and Slave, Rich and Poor." Oaklawn Cemetery is located at the intersection of Morgan Street and Harrison Street in downtown Tampa, about two blocks South of I-275. It has approximately 1,700 graves.

Oaklawn Cemetery includes a section for Catholic burials called St. Louis Catholic Cemetery. The two graveyards were added as a Historic District to the U.S. National Register of Historic Places on September 19, 2017. The Sexton House was used for equipment storage and maintenance activities. The cemetery was of the "Rural Cemetery" style. The First Mayor of the City of Tampa, Judge Joseph B. Lancaster, is buried at Oaklawn, as is the 6th mayor, James McKay Sr. Others include pirates, slaves, yellow fever epidemic victims and confederate soldiers. Notable areas and gravesites in the cemetery include the gravesites of Henry Laurens Mitchell, John T. Lesley Family, Samuel Friebele, Charlie Wall, the Hooker Family, James McKay Jr., James C. Field, Joseph B. Lancaster, the Krause Family, the Wall Family, mass graves, gravesite of James T. Magbee, the gravesites of William and Nancy Ashley, gravesites of John P. Wall, James Gettis, grave art, and the "Cradle Graves."

== Saint Louis Catholic Cemetery ==
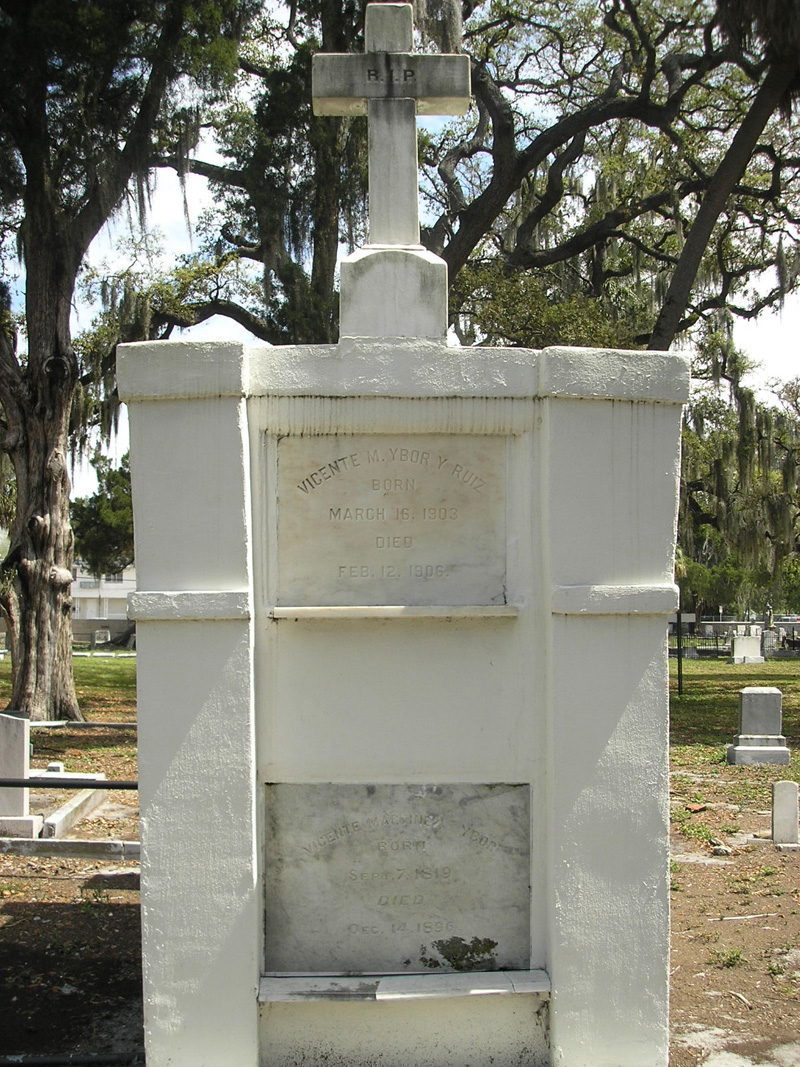
Vicente Martinez-Ybor's grave lies in the St. Louis section of Oaklawn Cemetery

The northwest section is actually a separate cemetery known as Saint Louis Catholic Cemetery. Established in 1874, it had its own entry gates and was for many years completely separated from Oaklawn by an iron fence. Among those buried in the St. Louis section are the founder of Ybor City, Vicente Martinez Ybor, five pioneer priests (three of whom died in a 15-day period during the 1887 yellow fever epidemic) and Cecilia Morse, the foundress of Catholic parochial education in the Tampa Bay area. A few remnants of the fence are still visible including several brick fence posts with marble finials, the original driveways and the gates that serviced only the St. Louis section. In 2010 and 2011, the Diocese of Saint Petersburg added Catholic Heritage Markers to the cemetery recognizing the contributions of both Mrs. Morse and the pioneer priests, as well as a site map which delineates the "Saint Louis section" of the graveyard.

== Sexton House ==
The Sexton House, formerly known as the Pavilion or Gazebo, was constructed in 1910 for caretaker tools and equipment. The word "sexton" is from the Latin "sacristanus" which means "someone who looks after the sacred objects."

== Darwin Branch Givens ==
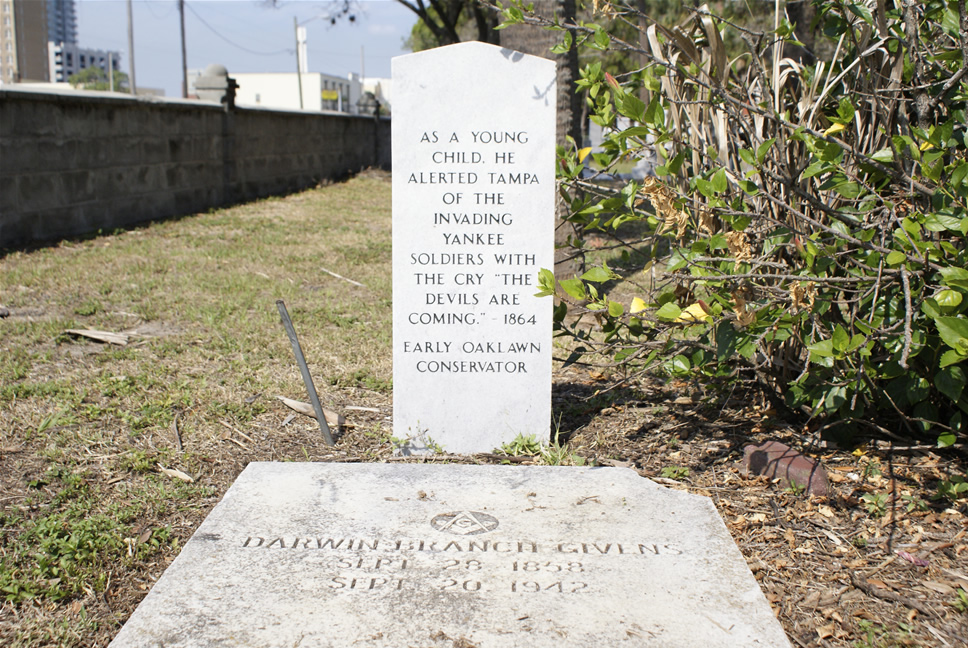
Darwin Branch Givens marble marker at Oaklawn Cemetery

A gravesite for Darwin Branch Givens (born 1858 – died 1942) includes a marble marker at the gravesite inscribed:

As a young
child, he
alerted Tampa
of the
invading
Yankee
soldiers with
the cry "the
devils are
coming." 1864

Early Oaklawn
Conservator"

== Image gallery ==
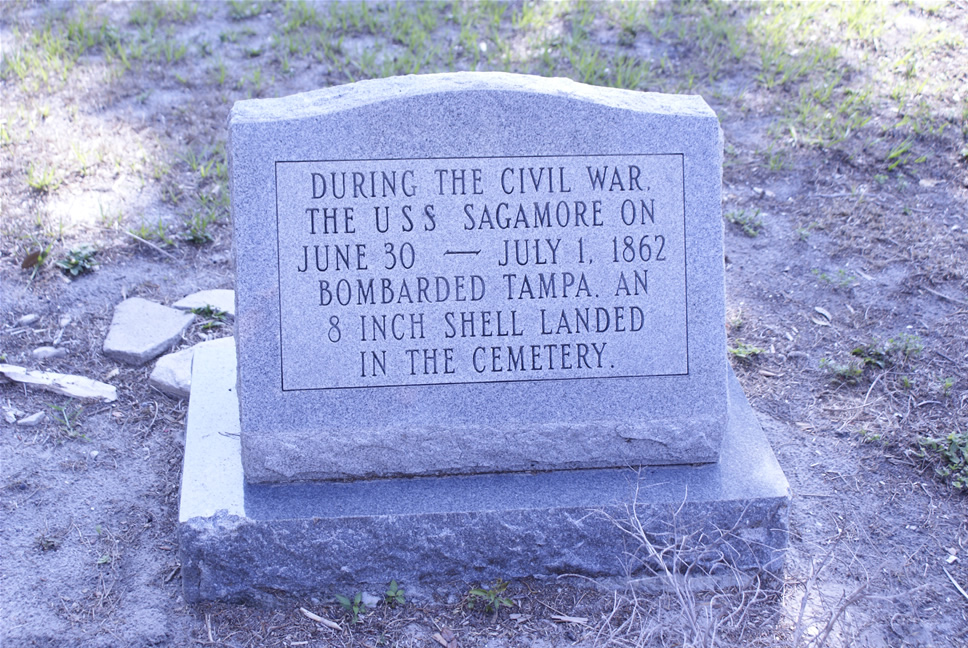
USS Sagamore marker

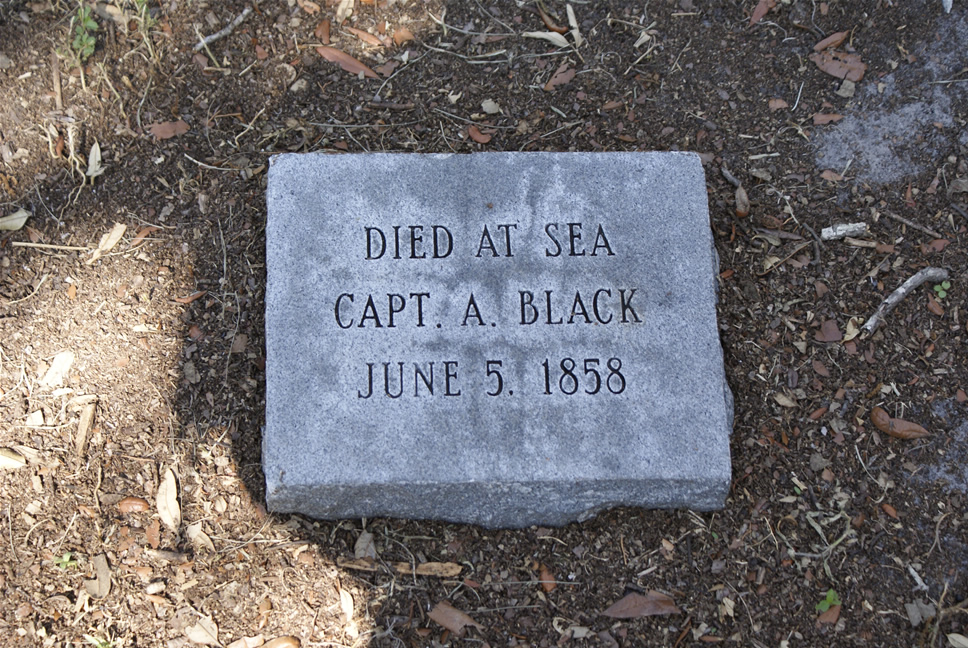
Captain Black, Died at Sea

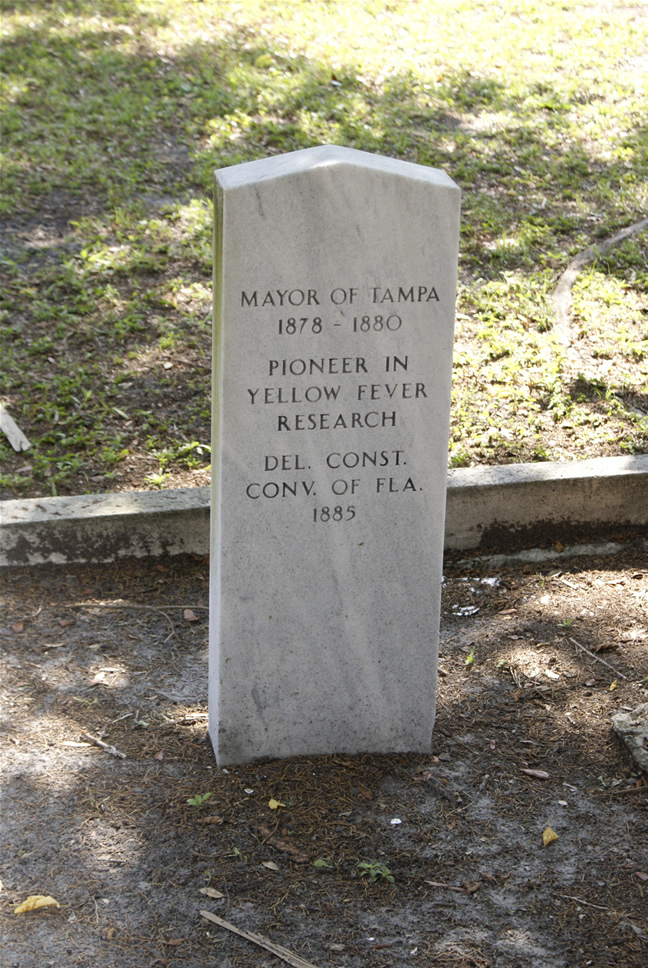
John P. Wall, 15th Mayor of Tampa

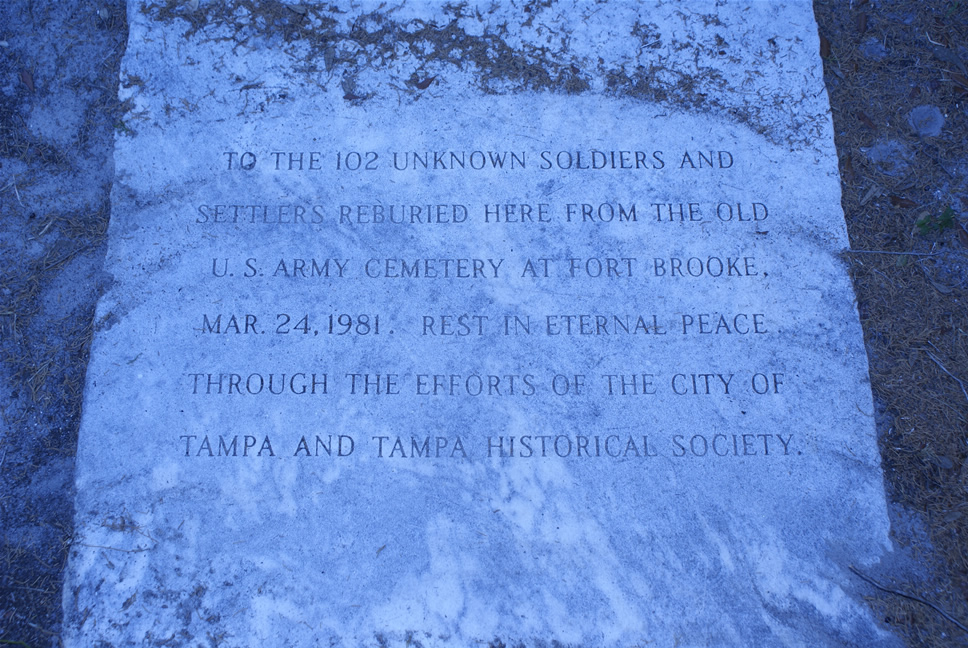
102 Unknown Monument

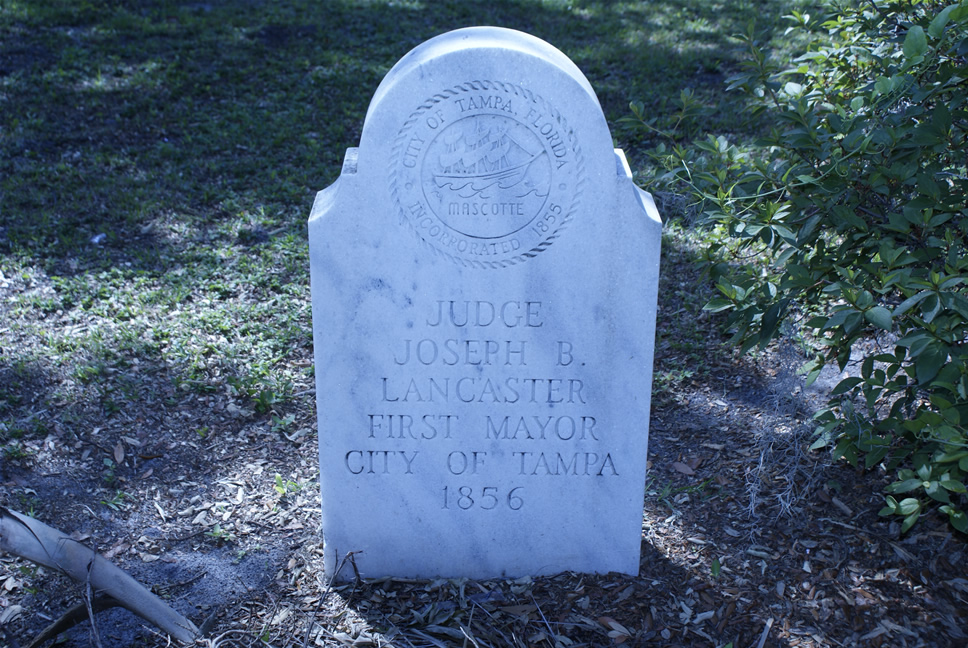
Joseph Lancaster, First Mayor of Tampa, grave

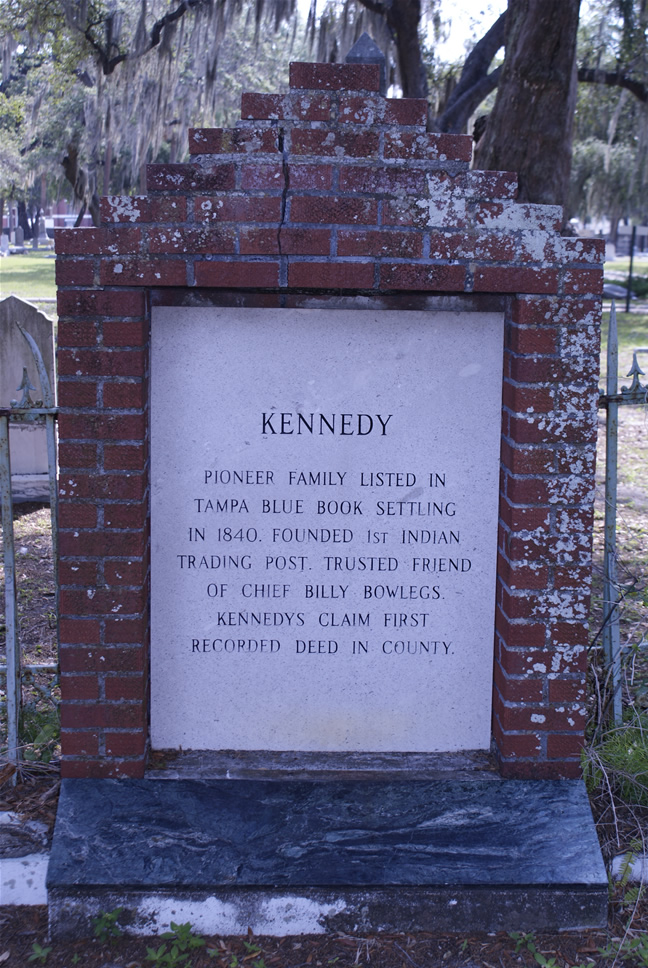
Kennedy Monument

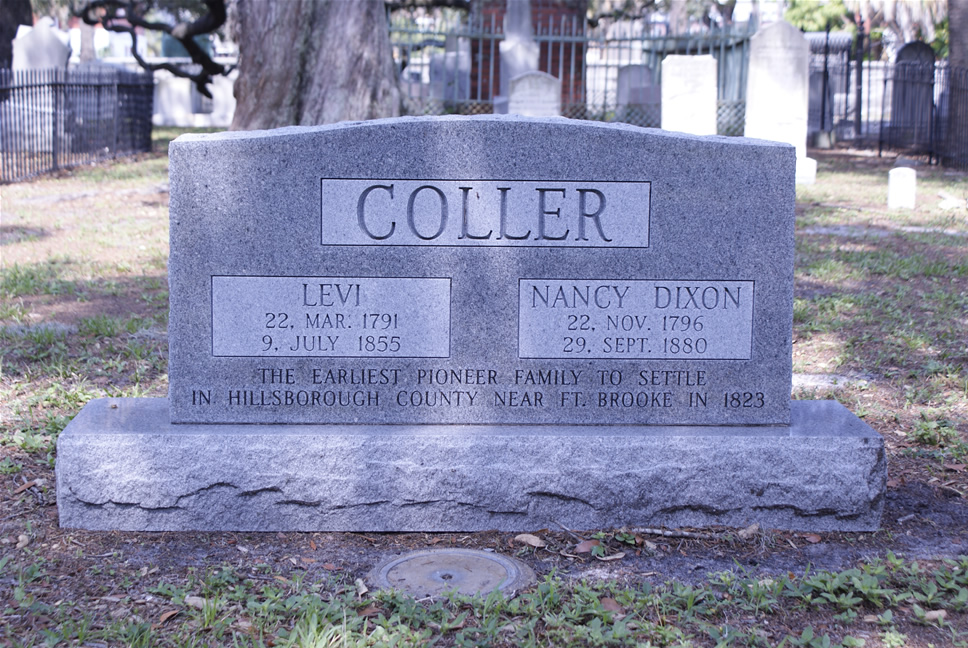
Coller Marker, Tampa's First Settlers

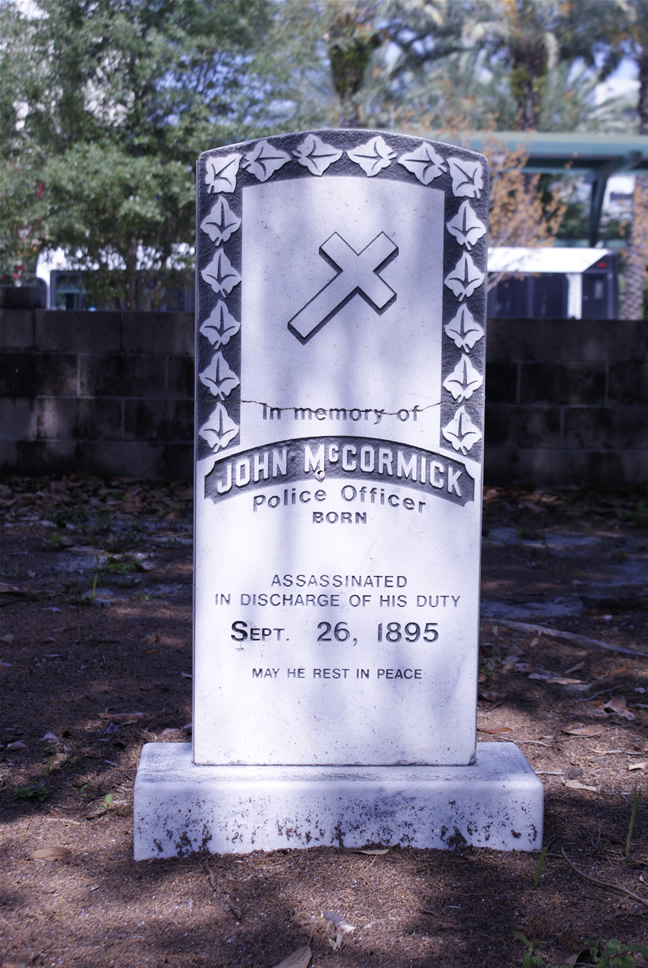
John McCormick, Tampa PD's first officer killed in the line of duty

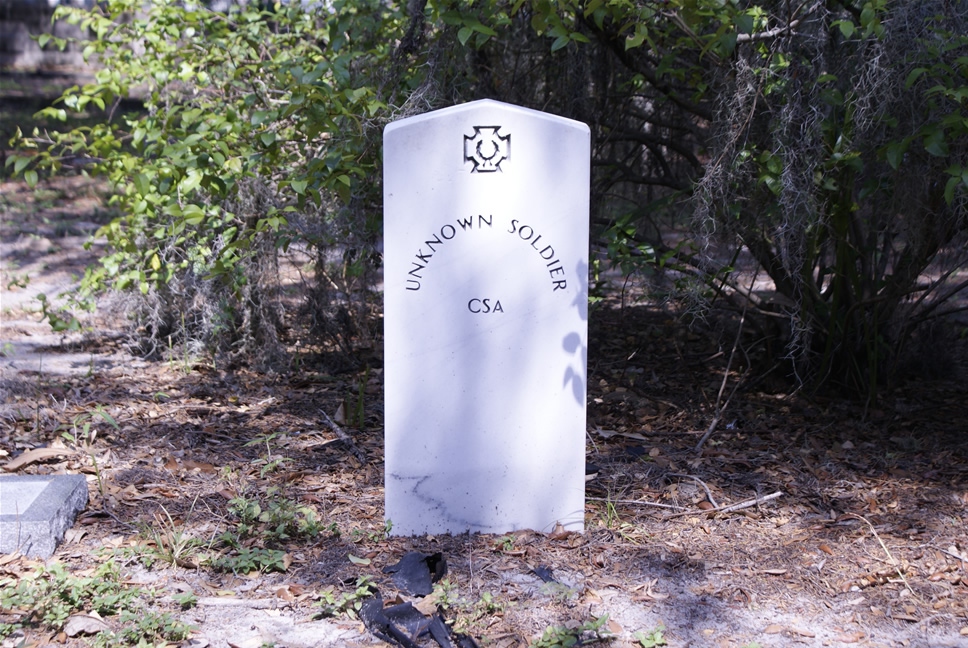
Confederate Unknown Soldier

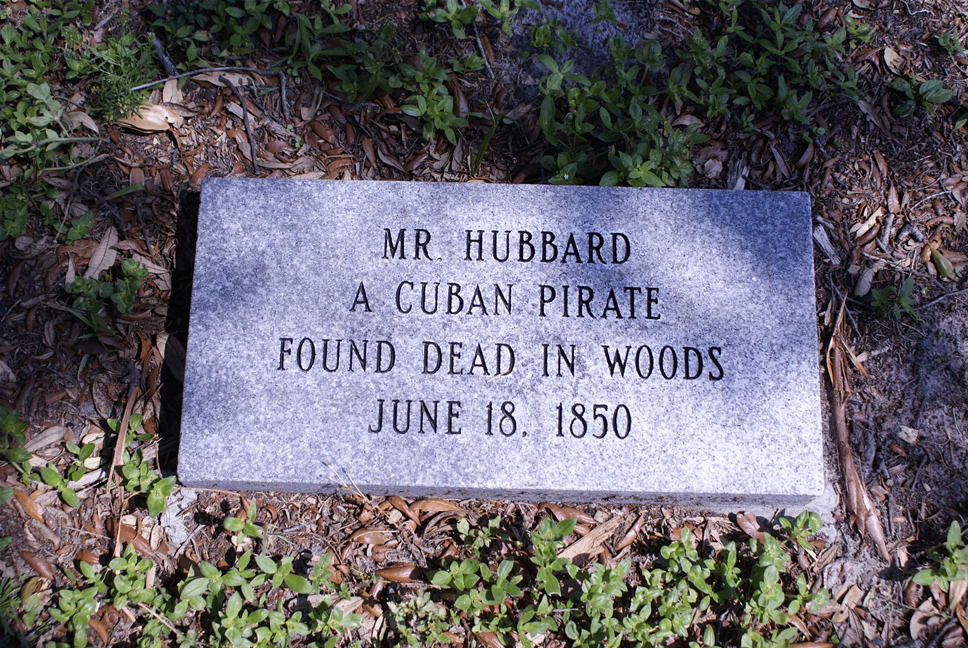
Pirate Grave

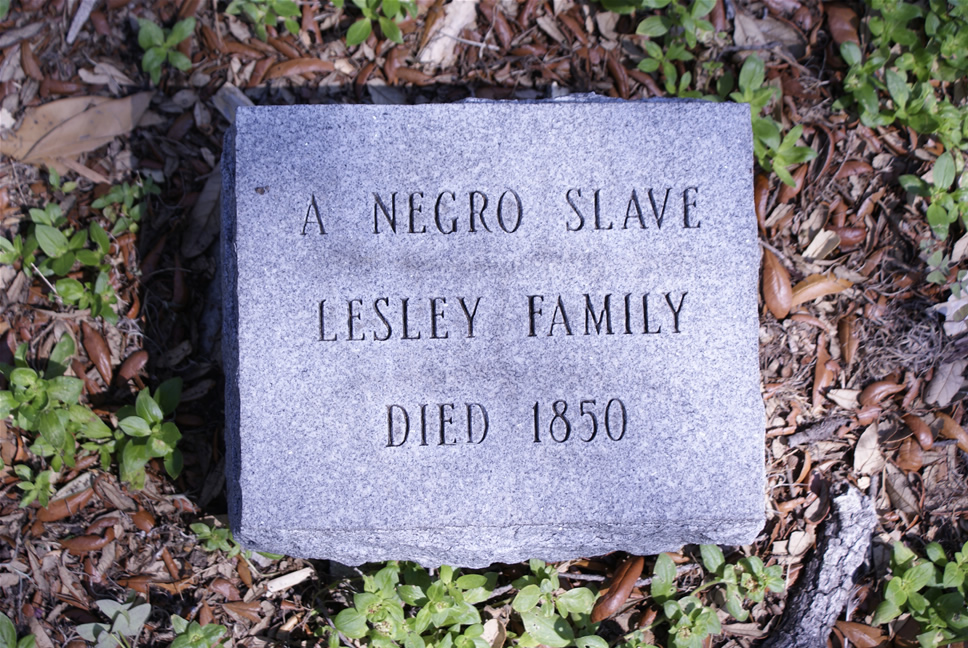
Lesley Family Slave Grave, No name listed

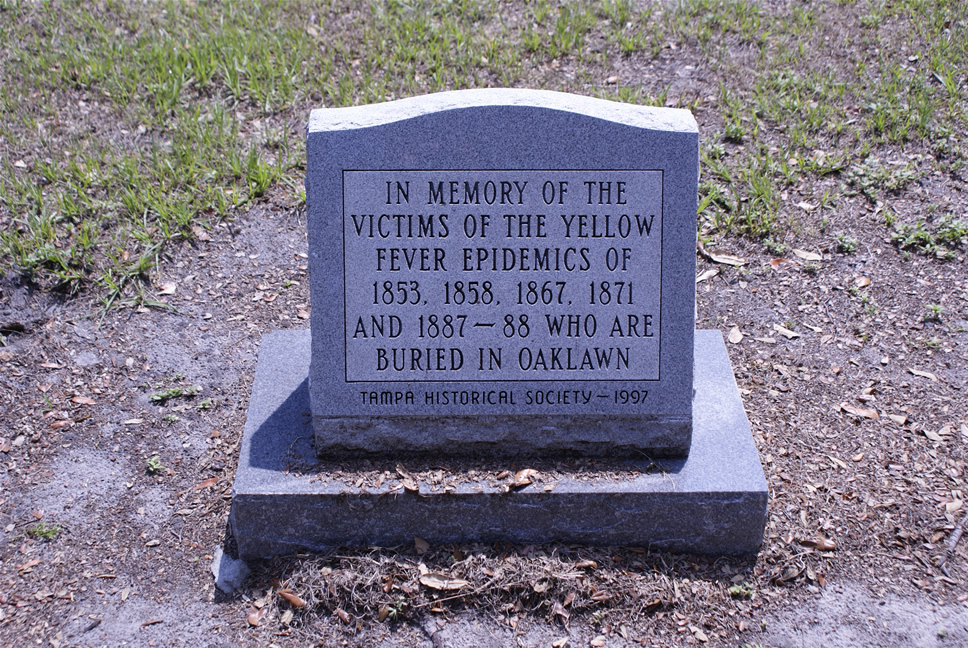
Yellow Fever Monument

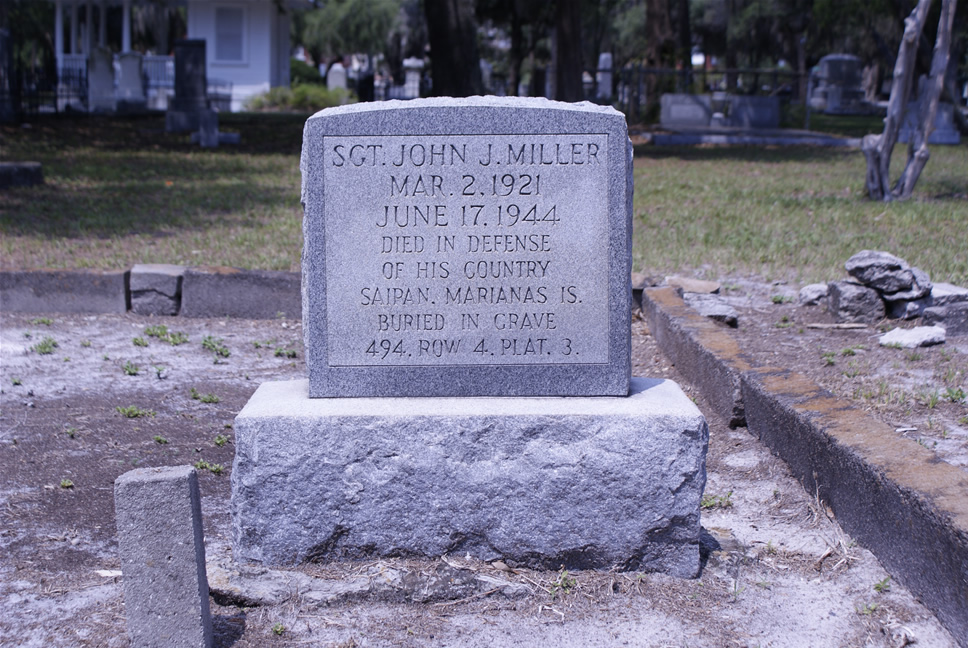
Sgt John Miller, WWII

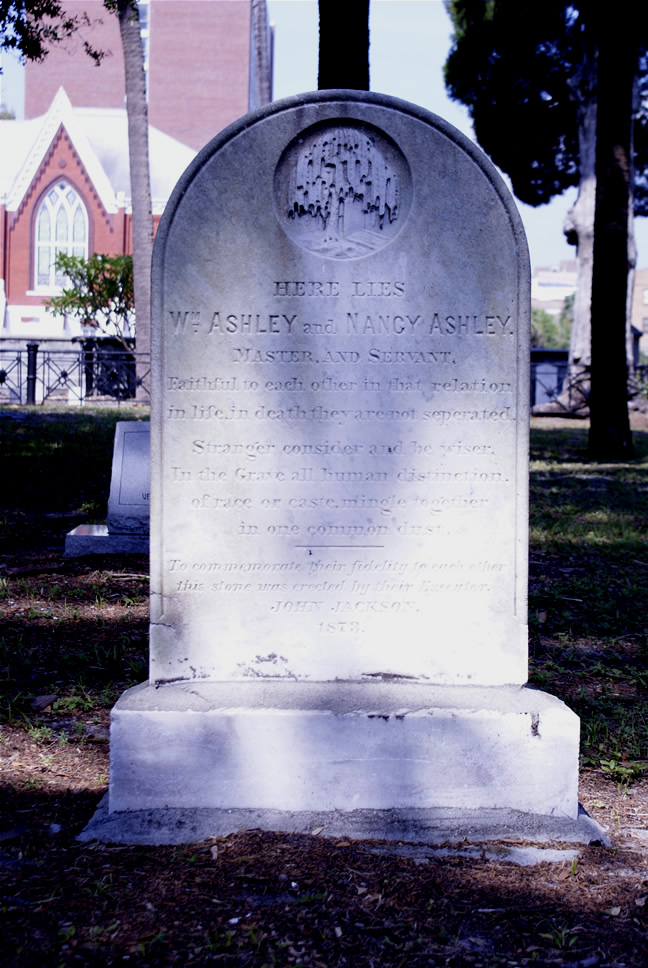
William and Nancy Ashley, Master and Servant grave
