= Gavino Gutierrez =

American businessman and civil engineer (1849–1919)

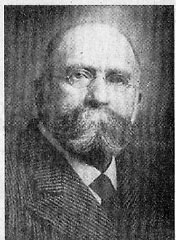
Gavino Gutierrez

Gavino Gutierrez (26 October 1849 – 8 March 1919), a Spanish immigrant to the United States, was an importer, architect, civil engineer, and surveyor. He was responsible for bringing Vincente M. Ybor to Tampa, Florida, and for designing Ybor City.

== Birth and background ==
Gutierrez was born on October 26, 1849, in San Vicente de la Barquera, located in the northern Spanish province of Santander. He left Spain for Cuba as a young man, where he worked in a store. In 1868, at the age of 19, Gutierrez moved to New York City. During his first month in New York, he worked as a bellhop and established an import-export business, selling goods from Spain, Cuba, and Mexico. In addition, he studied architecture, engineering, surveying, and English, eventually becoming a civil engineer.

== Arrival in Tampa ==
Gutierrez had a friend named Bernardino Gargol, who owned marmalade and guava paste factories in Cuba, and was also a native Cuban who lived in New York and ran an import-export business. Gargol told Gutierrez that there were many wild guava trees growing in the Tampa Bay area. Gargol wanted to establish a factory in Tampa for the manufacture of guava paste, in order to not have to import the products. Gargol asked Gutierrez to accompany him to Tampa, as Gargol could not speak English. They made the trip to Tampa by rail to Jacksonville, Florida, took a steamboat down the St. Johns River to Sanford, Florida, and finished their trip by stagecoach. A rail line between Tampa and Sanford existed at this time, but was isolated from the rest of the national rail network.

Gutierrez and Gargol did not find the number of guava trees they were looking for, but they liked the idea of using Tampa for other purposes. Gutierrez felt that Tampa would be a good site for import-export businesses, due to its good natural harbor and mild climate.

== Convincing Ybor to come to Tampa ==
After Gutierrez and Gargol explored Tampa, they planned to return to New York by boat, with a stop in Key West. While there, they met a man named Vincente M. Ybor, who owned a large cigar factory that he planned to move elsewhere, due to labor disputes and the fact that Key West could only be reached by boat. Gutierrez suggested to Ybor that he move to Tampa, arguing that Tampa's climate was similar to that of Havana and Key West, and that Tampa was connected by rail (since Henry Plant built the South Florida Railway) to the northern United States.

Gutierrez and Gargol met with a number of other men in Key West. Among them were Eduardo Manrara, who had been a member of Ybor's cigar firm since 1872, had also been to Tampa while on his way to Key West, and believed the area would be suitable for a cigar factory. In addition, they also met with Ignacio Haya (another cigar manufacturer), who thought Tampa might be a good location to build a factory for his own firm, Sanchez y Haya.

== Building Ybor City ==
After Ybor and Haya visited Tampa, they both decided to build cigar factories near the town. Ybor wanted land that was somewhat separate from the city. Ybor made Gutierrez his architect and construction foreman, after which he surveyed land two miles from Tampa for Ybor, detailing that the streets would run north and south and the avenues would run east and west. This new town and Tampa were separated by palmetto scrub lands. This new town was intended to be similar to other industry towns being built across the country and was to be centrally planned. Construction began on October 8, 1885, when the first tree was cut down. Ybor and Haya built homes for their workers near the cigar factories; with two to three bedrooms and white-picket fences, they were considered superior to the homes in Key West or Havana. In early 1885, Gutierrez, liquidated his businesses in New York and moved to Tampa. Construction of both firm's factories was completed in January 1886. Haya's factory had the honor of making the first cigar in Tampa on April 13, 1886.

Ybor City, the new name for the town, grew quickly. Even though Ybor opposed Tampa's annexation of Ybor City, it was incorporated as Tampa's Fourth Ward on June 2, 1887. In a short amount of time, the new city grew to 10,000 people, and had numerous factories, restaurants, social clubs, hotels, stores, and homes. Ybor City became a support center for the Cuban War of Independence in the late 1800s, and had thousands of men stationed in the city during the Spanish–American War, including Teddy Roosevelt's Rough Riders.

Ybor City became known as the "Cigar Capital of the World". It grew to have 200 cigar factories that produced 700 million cigars a year. Today Ybor City is one of three National Historic Landmark Districts in the state of Florida.

== Spanish consul ==
Gutierrez was made the first Spanish consul in Tampa by the Spanish government, holding this unpaid position for many years. During the Cuban War of Independence, he was mentioned a number of times in papers around the country, including the New York Times, the Baltimore Morning Herald, and the Easton Free Press.

== Gutierrez Building ==
The Gutierrez building, designed by him and located at 1603 East Seventh Avenue in Ybor City, was built in 1904. The three-story building has a decorative balcony across the front and partially wrapping around the side. Originally, the first floor was used for stores, offices, and the Pathe Theater. The second floor housed both a hotel called the Dixie House, and apartments. The third floor was built for a local chapter of the Woodmen of the World.

== Personal life ==
Gutierrez married Nelly Daly on October 31, 1877. They had three daughters, Aurora, Adelaida, and Maria Harriot, and a son, Gavino Junior. Aurora married D.B. McKay, the owner and editor-in-chief of the Tampa Daily Times, as well as being one of the founders of the University of Tampa, and the mayor of Tampa for 14 years. They had seven daughters and three sons. Aurora died in October 1956. Adelaida married Francisco Colado, with whom she had three sons and two daughters. Maria Harriot married a Tampa physician named L.B. Mitchell. Gavino Junior married a native of Santander named Lolita Del Corro, with whom he had two sons and two daughters.

In 1919, Gutierrez was sailing around the world on the ship of a Scottish friend, when they docked in a Spanish port. While in Spain, Gutierrez fell ill and died on March 8, 1919. Due to Spanish law, Gutierrez's body was not returned to Tampa until 1924. Gutierrez is buried at Myrtle Hill Memorial Park.

== See also ==
- History of Ybor City
- History of Tampa, Florida
