= Santo Trafficante Sr. =

Sicilian-born American mobster

- Santo Trafficante Sr., unknown year
- Born: May 28, 1886; Cianciana, Sicily, Italy
- Died: April 11, 1954 (aged 68); Tampa, Florida, U.S.
- Occupation: Crime boss
- Spouse: Maria Giuseppa Cacciatore (m. 1909)
- Children: 5 sons, including Santo Trafficante Jr.
- Allegiance: Trafficante crime family

Santo Trafficante Sr. (May 28, 1886 – August 11, 1954) was a Sicilian-born mobster, and father of the powerful mobster Santo Trafficante Jr.

== Biography ==
In 1904 Trafficante came to the United States from Sicily. He gained power as a mobster in Tampa, Florida and ruled the Mafia in Tampa from the 1930s until his death in 1954. Trafficante was heavily involved in the operation of illegal bolita lotteries. During his reign, Trafficante was a well-respected boss with ties to Charles "Lucky" Luciano and Thomas Lucchese.

In Tampa he was a member of L’Unione Italiana Club and Elk’s Lodge No. 708, two of the city’s most prominent fraternal organizations. During the 1940s, Trafficante Sr. maintained a strong alliance with Tommy Lucchese, the boss of the Lucchese crime family in New York City. Lucchese would help train his son Trafficante Jr. in the mafia traditions. Trafficante partnered with Francisco Prío, brother of Cuban president Carlos Prío Socarrás, and Cuban Senator Indalecio Pertierra, in narcotics trafficking.

Trafficante died of stomach cancer on August 11, 1954; he was a member of L'Unione Italiana, and he was buried in L'Unione Italiana Cemetery in Ybor City. His son, Santo Trafficante Jr. subsequently took over the crime family.

Business positions
Preceded by Ignacio Antinori	Trafficante crime family Boss; 1940–1954	Succeeded by Santo Trafficante Jr.
