= Tito Rubio =

American mobster

Evaristo "Tito" Rubio (February 5, 1902 – March 8, 1938) was an American mobster of Cuban descent and an associate of businessman and crime boss Charlie Wall. Rubio was also a leader in Tampa's Cuban community, prominently involved in illegal numbers racket with Wall.

== Early life ==
Rubio was born on February 5, 1902, in Tampa, Florida.

== Turf wars and death ==
Wall and Rubio had been involved in a violent turf war with Ignacio Antinori. Eddie Virella, Rubio's associate and a co-owner of the Eldorado Club, was shot down by gunmen on January 31, 1937. Rubio himself was attacked and killed on the back porch of his home on 15th St. in Ybor City, Tampa, Florida, on March 8, 1938.
