= 7th Florida Infantry Regiment =

- Regimental colors (from ca. March or April 1864 to April 1865)
- Active: April 1862–1865
- Allegiance: Confederate Florida; Confederate States of America
- Branch: Confederate States Army
- Role: Infantry

The 7th Florida Infantry Regiment was a Civil War regiment from Florida organized at Gainesville, in April 1862. Its companies were recruited in the counties of Bradford, Hillsborough, Alachua, Manatee, and Marion.

== Organization and Service history ==
During the war it served in the Florida Brigade of the Army of Tennessee. The nucleus of Company K of the regiment was made up of men who served as a militia Coast Guard company before the war. One member of the unit described the diverse nature of the company by saying "it is composed of Yankees, Crackers, Conchs, Englishmen, Spaniards, Germans, Frenchmen, Italians, Poles, Irishmen, Swedes, Chinese, Portuguese, Brazilians...also Scotsmen, Welshmen, and some Half Indians."

Former Governor of Florida, Madison S. Perry served as colonel of the regiment until April 1863.

The 7th took an active part in the arduous campaigns of the army from Chickamauga to Nashville, then fought its last battle at Bentonville.

== Companies ==
Company	County	Nickname	Commander
A	Alachua		Capt. Roland Thomas (resigned, replaced by Henry F York)
B	Hillsborough	South Florida Rifles	Capt. James Gettis
C	Alachua	Alachua Rangers	Capt. Philip B. H. Dudley
D	Alachua	Alachua Rebels	Capt. Simeon VanLandingham
E	Hillsborough	South Florida Bulldogs	Capt. Nathan S. Blount
F			Capt. William W. Sloan
G	Marion		Capt. S. D. McConnell
H	Marion	Marion Hornets	Capt. Wade H. Eichelberger
I			Capt. A. S. Moseley
K	Hillsborough	Key West Avengers (Note: Despite being raised from Hillsborough County, Company K was known as the Key West Avengers because many of the men in the unit were mariners and fisherman from Key West.)	Capt. R. B. Smith

== See also ==
- List of Florida Confederate Civil War units
