= Vicente Martínez Ybor =

Spanish entrepreneur (1818–1896)

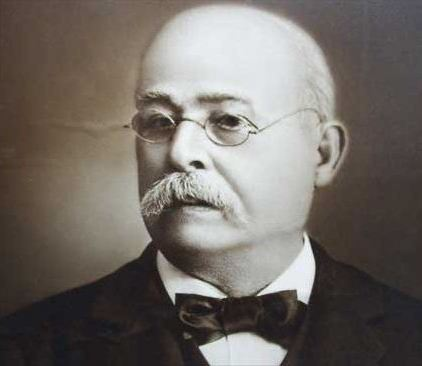
- Vicente Martínez Ybor c. 1890
- Born: 7 September 1818; Valencia, Spain
- Died: 14 December 1896 (aged 78); Tampa, Florida, U.S.
- Occupations: Industrialist, cigar manufacturer
- Known for: Founder of Ybor City, Tampa
- Spouses: Palmia Learas, Mercedes de las Revillas

Vicente Martínez Ybor (7 September 1818 – 14 December 1896) was a Spanish entrepreneur who first became a noted industrialist and cigar manufacturer in Cuba, then Key West, and finally Tampa, Florida.

Martínez Ybor is best known for his founding of the immigrant-populated cigar manufacturing town of Ybor City just outside Tampa, Florida, in 1885. It was annexed by Tampa in 1887 and was a major factor in the community's rapid development from a small town into one of the largest cities in Florida and, for a time, the world's leader in cigar manufacturing. In addition to his Principe de Gales line of Cuban cigars, he founded many other businesses in Tampa including an insurance company, street paving, gas stations, a streetcar line, and Tampa's first brewery. For his workers, he built and sold hundreds of affordable homes, brought doctors to the area, and converted his original cigar factory into a social hall and theater for Tampa's first mutual aid society, El Centro Español de Tampa. His business interests were integral to the rapid expansion of the Port of Tampa and Tampa's overall economy.

When Martínez Ybor died in 1896, much of Tampa closed down to attend his funeral. He has been honored with a statue in Ybor City and a bust on the Tampa Riverwalk.

== Early life ==
Martínez Ybor was born in Valencia, Spain in 1818. In 1832, at the age of fourteen, he moved to Cuba to avoid the military service then mandatory for all male Spaniards, and took a job as a grocery clerk before learning the cigar business.

== History ==
=== Cuba ===
In 1856, Martínez Ybor founded his own small cigar manufacturing company in Havana, Cuba and began selling his El Principe de Gales ("Prince of Wales") brand. The brand quickly became popular, and Martínez Ybor's factory was soon producing 20,000 cigars a day. In 1868, the Ten Years' War broke out as Cubans fought to win independence from Spanish colonial rule. Martínez Ybor sympathized with the Cuban cause and was (correctly) accused by Spanish authorities of quietly providing funds and assistance to Cuban rebels. In 1869, he received word that he faced imminent arrest, so he and his family hurriedly fled to Key West, Florida.

=== Key West ===
Martínez Ybor soon opened a new factory in Key West and resumed manufacturing his Principe de Gales brand, employing many Cubans who had also left their homeland due to the war. Ybor was one of the first manufacturers to create and market a "Havana clear" or "Cuban clear" cigar - a product made with Cuban tobacco by (mostly) Cuban workers in the United States, thus avoiding the high tariff on the importation of finished cigars from Cuba.

While his business prospered, conflict between Spanish and Cuban workers, labor unrest, and the difficulty of transportation to and from the island city of Key West eventually led Martínez Ybor to decide that he should again relocate his business.

=== Ybor City ===
Beginning in the early 1880s, Martínez Ybor explored several possible relocation sites for his cigar business. Galveston, Texas was the leading candidate until his friend and city engineer Gavino Gutierrez recommended the small town of Tampa, Florida. Martínez Ybor and his business partners visited Tampa in September 1885, and the city quickly became their preferred choice due to the low price of land, hot and humid weather needed to keep cut tobacco workable, and convenient transportation links provided by Henry Plant's just-completed railroad and steamship lines. Difficult negotiations over a particular parcel of land almost scuttled the move, but a $5000 subsidy from Tampa's Board of Trade enticed Martínez Ybor to purchase 40 acres (16 ha) of scrubland northeast of Tampa in October 1885.

By the following spring, Martínez Ybor, along with business partner Eduardo Manrara and friendly rival cigar manufacturer Ignacio Haya, had bought several adjoining parcels, and Gavino Gutierrez was hired to plan and lay out a company town that was dubbed Ybor City. Martínez Ybor's cigar operations were based in a wooden factory until late 1886, when his permanent factory opened. The factory is an imposing brick complex that fills an entire city block and was the largest cigar manufacturing facility in the world at the time of its opening. Ybor's original wooden building was donated to the community and became the first home of El Centro Español de Tampa, an important social club and mutual aid society.

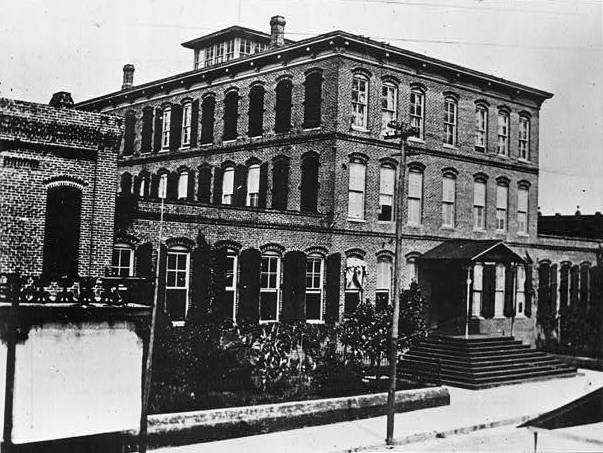
Ybor's cigar factory, c. 1902

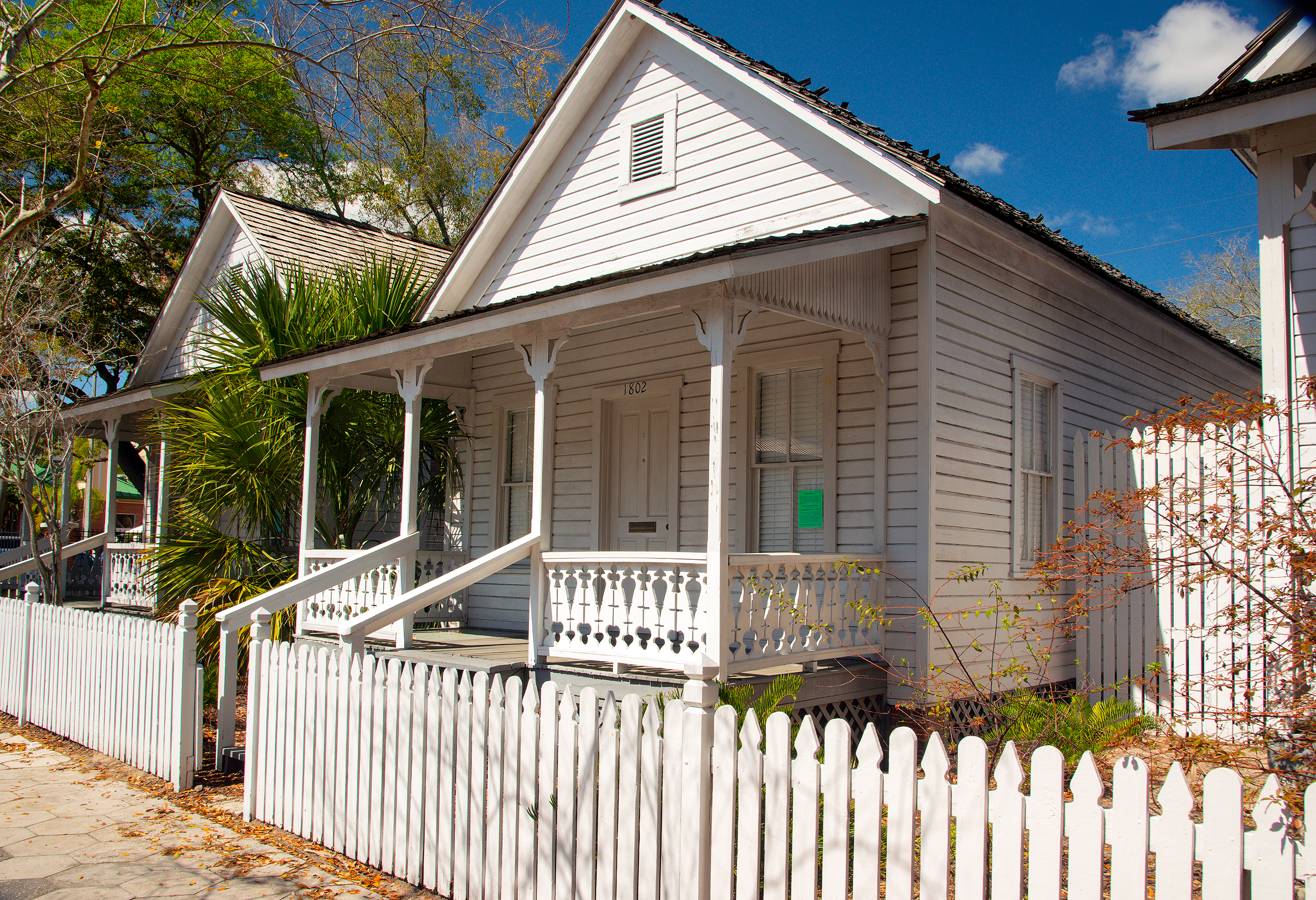
Restored casitas (homes for cigar workers in the late 1800s) at the Museum, Ybor City, Tampa

In mid-1886, a large fire in Key West destroyed much of the town and brought hundreds of Cuban and Spanish cigar workers to Tampa seeking employment. This influx began a period of steady growth that would continue for decades. Martínez Ybor sought to avoid the constant labor unrest he had struggled with in Key West by providing what he considered good wages and living conditions. His company built "casitas", small houses that his workers could purchase at cost, hoping that home ownership would keep his employees from migrating back and forth from Cuba as was common practice among cigar workers in those days.

Martínez Ybor encouraged other cigar manufacturers to open factories in Tampa to further increase the pool of workers, and welcomed entrepreneurs who founded businesses in the area. He himself established a variety of other businesses catering to the growing community, including a brewery, a hotel, an ice factory, a gas company, a brick factory, an insurance company, and Tampa's first streetcar line, among other ventures.

Martínez Ybor's plan worked. After a slow start, both his businesses and Ybor City as a whole flourished, with the area's cigar factories hand-rolling and shipping tens of millions of cigars annually by the late 1880s, the number increasing into the hundreds of millions by the turn of the 20th century. Ybor City was annexed by the city of Tampa in 1887 and helped the once small and struggling town grow into an important manufacturing and shipping center by the early 1900s.

The role of Martínez Ybor in helping to build industry in Tampa is covered in displays at the Ybor City Museum State Park.

== Personal life ==
Martínez Ybor married Palmia Learas while living in Cuba in 1848, and they had four children before her death. He married Mercedes de las Revillas in 1862, and they had eight children together. Martínez Ybor also moved his family to Tampa upon establishing Ybor City, and several of his descendants still live in the area.

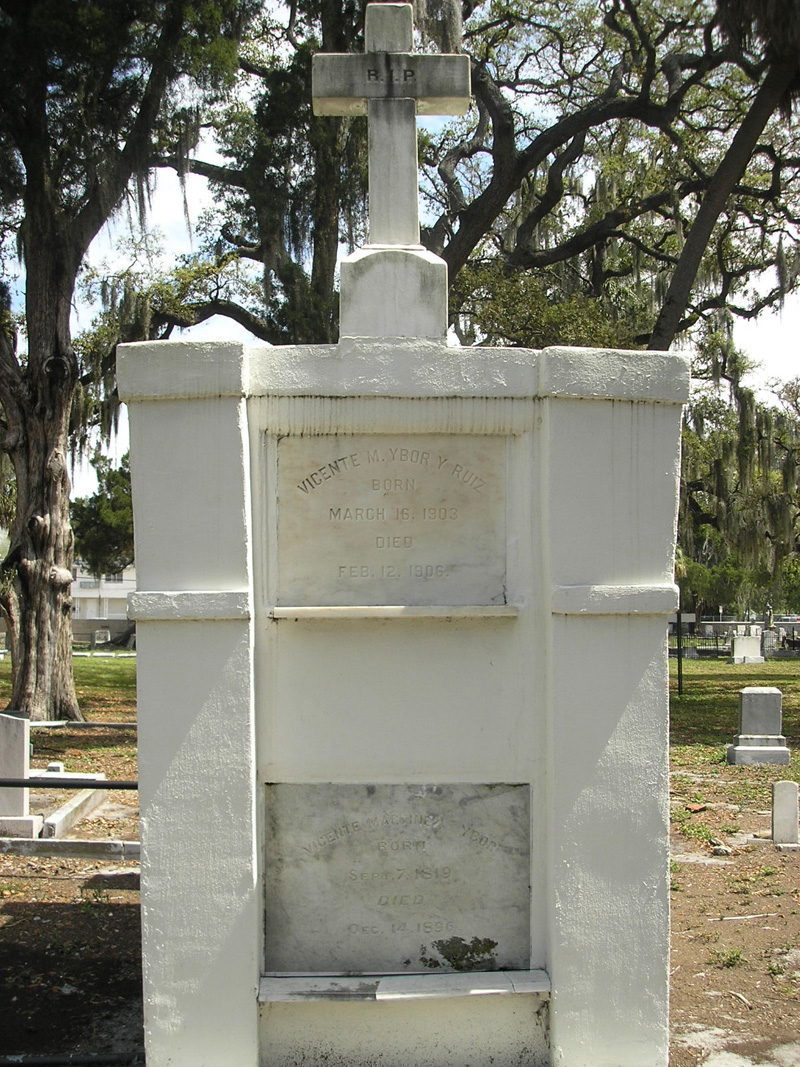
Martínez Ybor's grave site in the St. Louis section of Tampa's Oaklawn Cemetery

== Death and legacy ==
Martínez Ybor's role in initiating Tampa's phenomenal growth in population and wealth in the late 1890s was widely acknowledged and appreciated during his lifetime. After his death in Tampa on 14 December 1896, the headline of the Tampa Tribune read "Great Benefactor Gone" and many of the businesses in town closed in his honor for his funeral. He owned so many business ventures and real estate in the area that his partners concluded that there was not enough available capital in Tampa to turn his assets into money. His family eventually did sell off his holdings, but it took almost 10 years.

Martínez Ybor is interred in St. Louis Catholic Cemetery section of Oaklawn Cemetery in downtown Tampa. In honor of his contributions to the area's development, streets and schools are named for him, and his likeness is displayed as several pieces of public art, most notably a statue at Centro Ybor on 7th Avenue in Ybor City and a bronze bust on the Tampa Riverwalk near the Tampa Bay History Center.
