= Ignacio Antinori =

Sicilian born Italian-American mafia boss and drug trafficker (1885–1940)

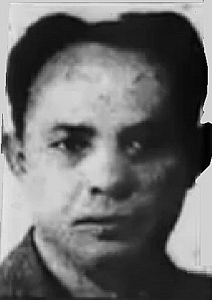
- Born: February 17, 1885; Palermo, Sicily, Italy
- Died: October 23, 1940 (aged 55); Tampa, Florida, U.S.
- Cause of death: killed by multiple gunshots to the head
- Occupations: Criminal figure, mafia boss, drug trafficker, racketeer

Ignacio Antinori (February 17, 1885 – October 23, 1940) was an Italian-born American mobster who built one of the earlier narcotics trafficking networks in Florida. Antinori was regarded as the first boss of the Tampa crime family, later known as the Trafficante crime family.

Although much of his early life is unknown, Antinori was one of the first mobsters to emerge in Florida during the Prohibition era. By the 1930s, Antinori was one of the largest heroin traffickers in the country, with close ties to French-Corsican heroin traffickers and American mafia bosses. Antinori established a drug pipeline from Marseille, France through Cuba into Tampa, Florida. According to the Federal Bureau of Narcotics, the drugs were subsequently distributed in the Midwestern United States, primarily through St. Louis mobster Thomas Buffa and Kansas City mobsters Nicola Impastato, James DeSimone and Joseph Deluca.

Law enforcement soon began to concentrate on Antinori's operation. In addition, mobsters such as Florida mobster Santo Trafficante Sr. soon set up rival smuggling rings. Antinori was eventually eclipsed by Trafficante, who held his own strong connections to Mangano crime family boss Vincent Mangano and Profaci crime family boss Joseph Profaci in New York.

On October 23, 1940, Ignacio Antinori was sipping coffee at the Palm Garden Inn in Tampa with a friend and a young female companion. Suddenly, a gunman appeared and fired two shotgun blasts at Antinori, blowing off the back of his head. The gunman was allegedly sent by one of Antinori's dissatisfied customers, the Chicago Outfit criminal organization. Antinori had sent the Outfit a poor quality shipment of narcotics. When the Outfit complained, Antinori refused a refund. At that point, the Outfit put a murder contract on Antinori.

== Bibliography ==
1. Sifakis, Carl The Mafia Encyclopedia. New York: Da Capo Press, 2005. ISBN 0-8160-5694-3
2. Deiche, Scott M. Cigar City Mafia - A Complete History of the Tampa Underworld, Barricade Books, 3-25-2004, ASIN# 8004449516.

Business positions
| Unknown | Trafficante crime family Boss; 1920–1940 | Succeeded by Santo Trafficante Sr. |
