= Battle of Fort Myers =

American Civil War battle in Florida

Coordinates: 26.631667°N 81.857222°W

- Part of the American Civil War
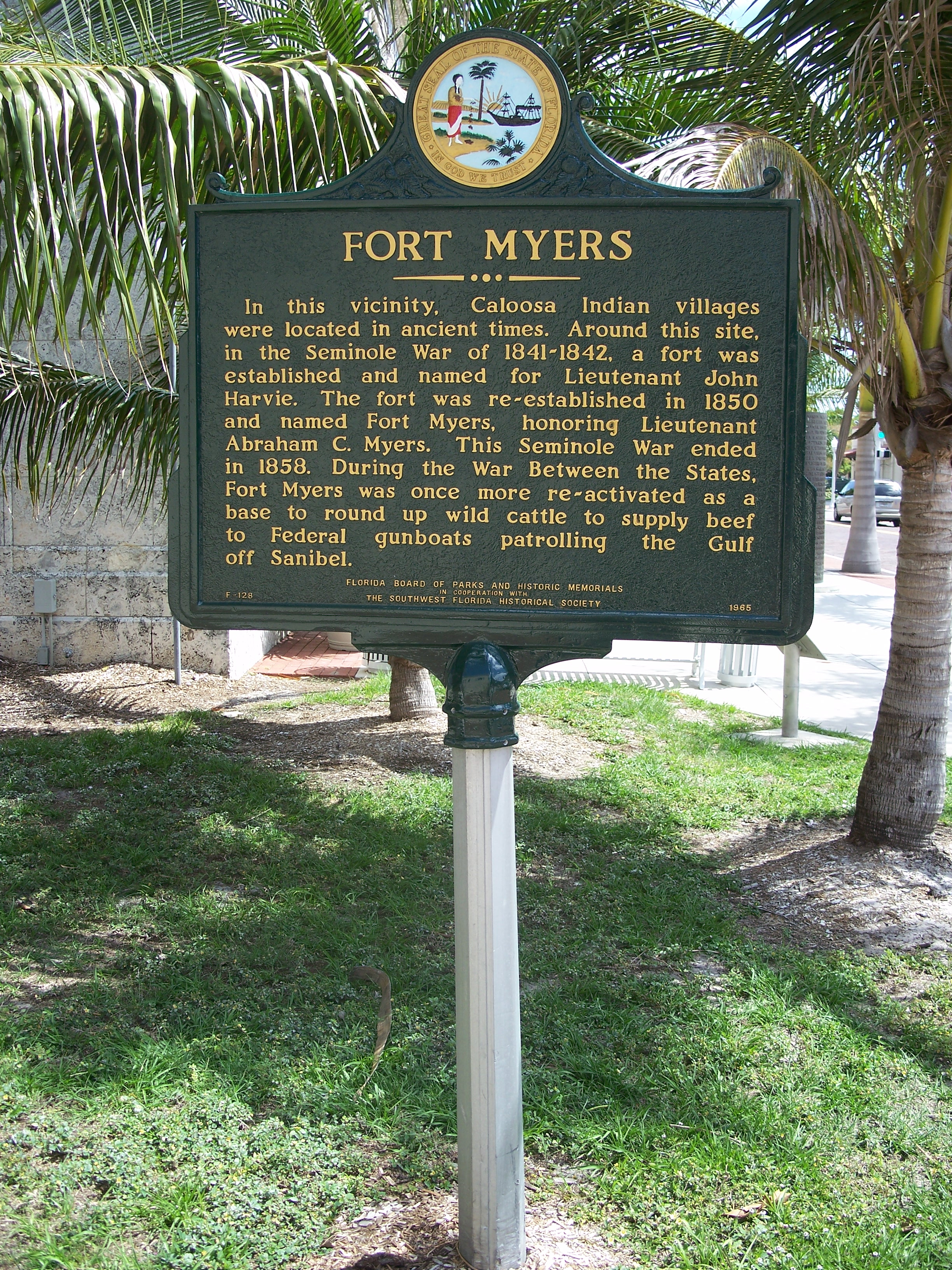
- Fort Myers, Florida: Historical marker
Date	February 20, 1865
Location	Lee County, Florida
Result	Minor Union victory

Belligerents
United States	Confederate States

Commanders and leaders
Capt. James Doyle	Col. C. J. Munnerlyn Maj. William Footman

Strength
300	250

Casualties and losses
1 dead, 3 wounded	1 wounded

The Battle of Fort Myers was fought on February 20, 1865, in Lee County, Florida during the last months of the American Civil War. This small engagement is known as the "southernmost land battle of the Civil War."

== Background ==
Fort Myers had been abandoned in 1858 after the Third Seminole War and was reoccupied by Union soldiers in December 1863. The Union commanders planned to send cavalry into the area north of the Caloosahatchee River to confiscate livestock from area cattle ranches, thereby preventing shipment of beef to the Confederate Army of Tennessee in Georgia. By 1865, it was estimated that more than 4,000 head of cattle had been taken from Florida cattlemen by the Union cavalry units from similar raids.

Fort Myers was used as a refugee center for escaped slaves and Union sympathizers who were being persecuted by the secessionists. Unionists had their homes burnt down and were driven off their farms. At one period during the Federal reoccupation, more than 400 people crowded into the fort's grounds. The fort was garrisoned primarily by the 2nd Florida Cavalry (made up mostly of refugees who had enlisted), a recently detached company of the 110th New York Volunteer Infantry, and a company from the 2nd United States Colored Infantry, both from Fort Zachary Taylor in Key West.

Confederate leaders in south Florida petitioned the Confederate government to organize the First Battalion of Special Cavalry known as the "Cow Cavalry" with the sole purpose of stopping the Union raids. This cattle guard battalion, commanded by Col. C. J. Munnerlyn, was made up of cattlemen who were exempt from the regular Confederate Army; among them was Captain Francis A. Hendry.

At the time that the Confederates planned their attack, the Fort was particularly weakened. There were only 250 men in Fort Myers and they were short on weapons and ammunition. On top of that, the troops from the 2nd USCT were still fatigued after returning only two days prior following sustained skirmishing with the enemy.

== Battle ==
In early February 1865, Captain Hendry's Company of the Cattle Guard Battalion was deployed at Fort Meade. They were ordered to attack Fort Myers because it was learned that the fort might soon be abandoned. Three companies (between 275 and 400 men) and one 12-pounder artillery piece arrived at old Fort Thompson (LaBelle, Florida) on February 19. They marched down the river and camped near Billy's Creek. The next morning, they surprised several black Union soldiers on picket duty and shot or captured them as they tried to flee.

The firing had alerted the fort, so the Confederates fired a warning shot from their cannon, followed by a messenger demanding the Union troops surrender. The fort's commanding officer, Capt. James Doyle, sent back a refusal: "Your demand for an unconditional surrender has been received. I respectfully decline; I have force enough to maintain my position and will fight you to the last." Doyle wheeled his own two cannons outside the fort. A battle began with the black Union soldiers firing the artillery and the white Union cavalrymen firing their carbines. Throughout the day, both sides continued sporadic firing, which finally ceased at dark. One black Federal soldier had been killed in the skirmishing.

The next morning, the Cattle Guard Battalion returned to Fort Meade. Even though the attack had been repelled, Fort Myers was abandoned by its garrison in early March.
