= 1st Florida Special Cavalry Battalion =

1st Special Cavalry Battalion
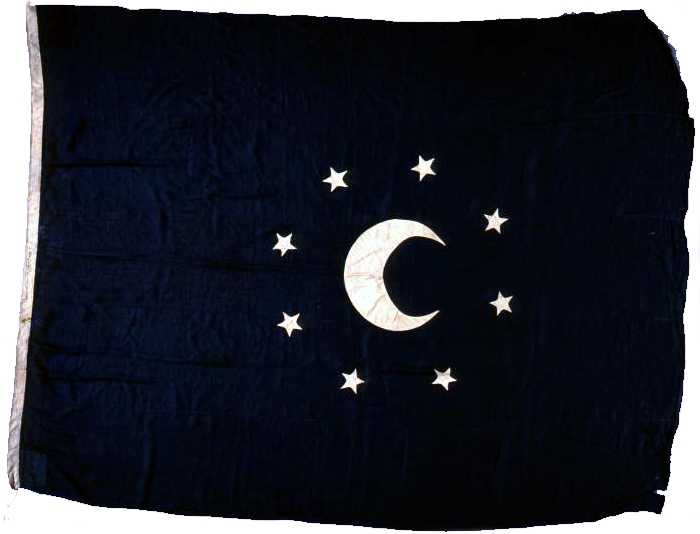
- Active: 1864–1865
- Country: Confederate States of America
- Allegiance: Florida
- Branch: Confederate States Army
- Type: Battalion
- Role: Cavalry
- Nickname: Cow Cavalry
- Engagements: American Civil War: Battle of Fort Myers; Battle of Levyville

Commanders
- Notable commanders: C. J. Munnerlyn Major William Footman

The 1st Florida Battalion Special Cavalry, nicknamed the "Cow Cavalry", was a Confederate States Army cavalry unit from Florida during the American Civil War. Commanded by Charles James Munnerlyn; it was organized to protect herds of cattle from Union raiders. The hides and meat from Florida cattle were a critical supply item for the Confederacy.

== Organization and Operation ==
In March 1864, Captain James McKay Sr., petitioned the Confederate government to create the unit. Confederate President Jefferson Davis, selected Munnerlyn who was commissioned as a Major to lead the Special Cavalry.

Eventually a total of nine companies, largely made up of Florida crackers, was organized. They would drive cattle to Baldwin, Florida a railhead near Jacksonville, Florida. Some of the companies were based out of Brooksville, Tampa, Plant City, and Fort Meade

Captains William B. Hooker, Leroy G. Lesley, John T. Lesley, Francis A. Hendry, and W. B. Henderson were leaders of the Cow Cavalry. Capt. McKay's son, James McKay Jr., was appointed as Captain of one of the companies and eventually rose to the rank of Major in the unit.

In February 1865 several companies of the battalion operating in the Cedar Key and Gulf Hammock region engaged Federal troops at the Battle of Levyville.

Also, in February 1865, Major William Footman led the companies of Francis A. Hendry, John T. Lesley, and Leroy G. Lesley in the Battle of Fort Myers.

On June 5, 1865, the last remnants of the Cow Cavalry formally surrendered to the Second Florida Cavalry of the Union army at Bayport, Florida.

== See also ==
- List of Florida Confederate Civil War units
