= Charles James Munnerlyn =

American politician

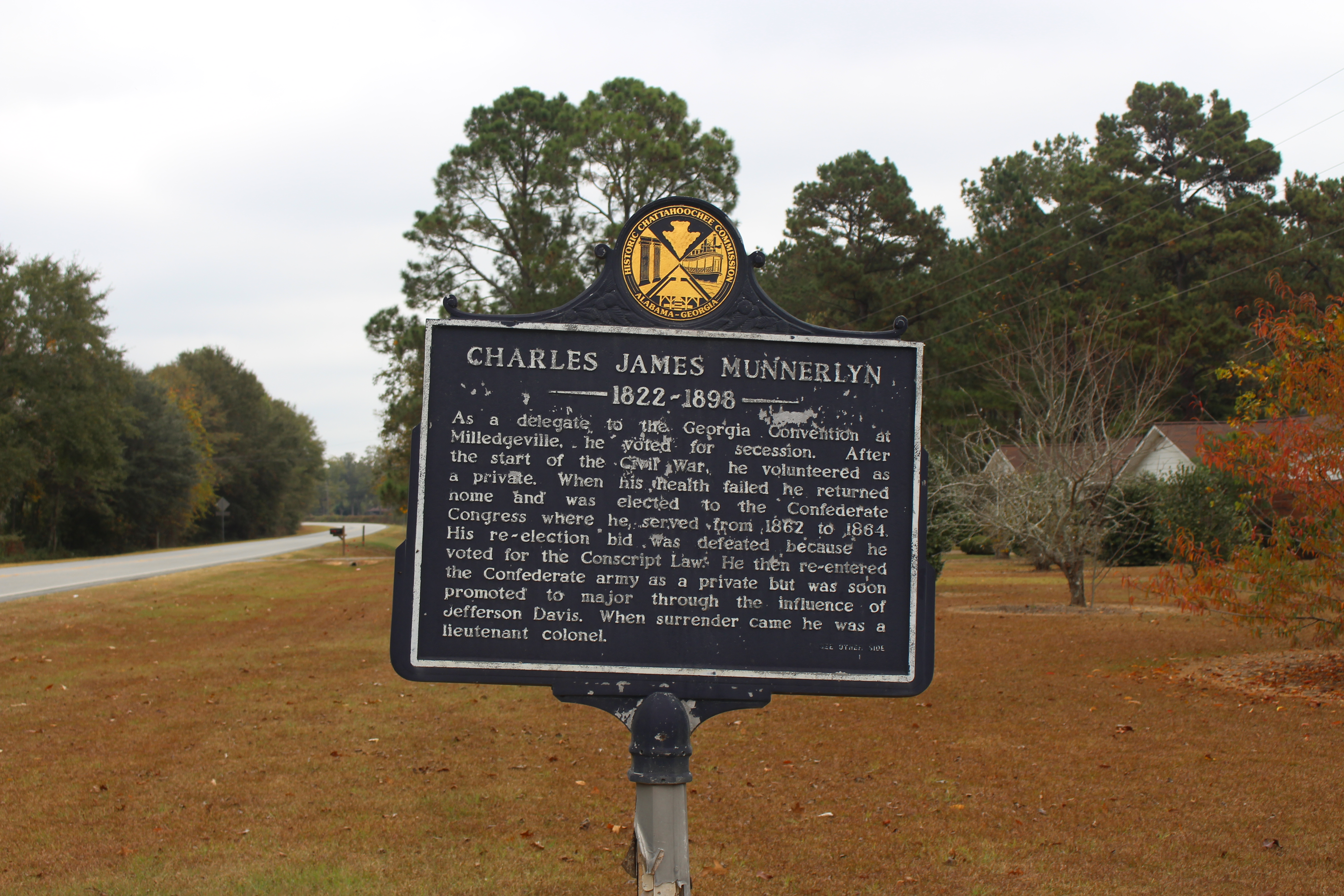
- Born: February 14, 1822; Georgetown, Georgetown County, South Carolina, USA
- Died: May 17, 1898 (aged 76); Bainbridge, Decatur County, Georgia, USA
- Burial place: Munnerlyn Cemetery, Bainbridge, Decatur County, Georgia, USA
- Military career
- Allegiance: Confederate States of America
- Branch: Confederate States Army
- Service years: 1861, 1864-1865
- Rank: Colonel
- Commands: 1st Florida Special Cavalry Battalion
- Conflicts: American Civil War

Charles James Munnerlyn (February 14, 1822 – May 17, 1898) was an American politician and military officer who served in the Confederate States of America. He served in the Confederate congress and commanded the First Battalion, Florida Special Cavalry.

== Early life ==
Munnerlyn was born in Georgetown, South Carolina and later moved to Decatur County, Georgia. He was educated at Emory College and studied law under judge Augustus Baldwin Longstreet, the uncle of James Longstreet.

== Civil War ==
He attended the Secession Convention and signed the Ordinance of Secession before he served in the Confederate Army. He represented Georgia in the First Confederate Congress from 1862 to 1864. In 1864, he was ordered to Florida and organized the Cow Cavalry. With John T. Lesley and James McKay, he assisted in the escape of Judah Benjamin.
