= USS Para =

Gunboat of the United States Navy

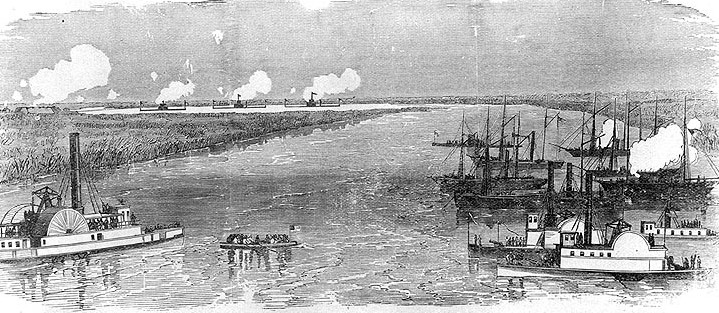
- USS Para with ships at right

History

United States
- Name: USS Para
- Acquired: 9 September 1861
- Commissioned: 4 February 1862
- Decommissioned: 5 August 1865
- Fate: Sold, 8 September 1865

General characteristics
- Type: Schooner
- Displacement: 200 long tons (200 t)
- Length: 98 ft (30 m)
- Beam: 24 ft (7.3 m)
- Draft: 9 ft (2.7 m)
- Depth of hold: 9 ft (2.7 m)
- Propulsion: Sail
- Armament: 1 × 13" mortar; 2 × 32-pounder guns

USS Para was a schooner acquired by the Union Navy during the American Civil War. She was used by the Navy to patrol navigable waterways of the Confederacy to prevent the South from trading with other countries.

== Service history ==
Para—a wooden schooner—was purchased from James Bishop & Co., New York City on 9 September 1861 and commissioned on 4 February 1862, Acting Master Edward J. Furber in command. Assigned first to the Gulf Squadron, Para participated in the bombardment of Fort Jackson and Fort St. Philip from 18 to 24 April 1862. Later transferred to the South Atlantic Blockading Squadron, she operated along the coasts of Florida, Georgia and South Carolina for the remainder of the war. On 19 June 1863, she captured blockade running schooner Emma off Mosquito Inlet, South Carolina.

Off Florida on 18 July, she sent men ashore in boats to participate in the attack on New Smyrna, Florida. The Union force captured a sloop loaded with cotton and an unladen schooner, burnt several other vessels, and destroyed all buildings which had been occupied by troops. Continuing operations off the southeastern seaboard, she escorted troops up the St. Mary's River to Woodstock, Florida, to obtain lumber, engaged Confederate forces along the riverbanks to cover the transports as they took on the lumber, captured steamer Hard Times, then covered the retirement of the transports from 16 to 23 February 1864. Para decommissioned at Boston, Massachusetts on 5 August 1865 and was sold at auction to J. C. Osgood on 8 September.
