= St. Augustine in the American Civil War =

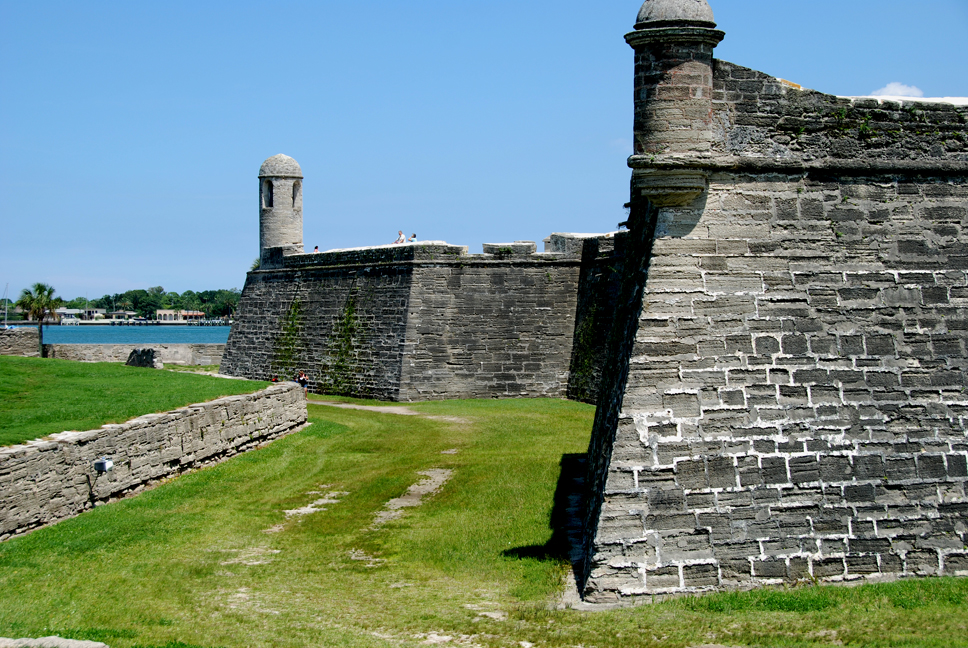
The Spanish built the Castillo de San Marcos to defend St. Augustine. After Florida became a U.S. territory, its name was changed to Fort Marion. Today a national park site, its name was officially restored to the Castillo de San Marcos.

During most of the American Civil War the Florida city of St. Augustine was under Union control. Its Confederate history was exceedingly brief. One Union general and one Confederate general were natives of the Ancient City. Many officers on both sides (including Union General William T. Sherman and Confederate General Braxton Bragg) had previous military experience in St. Augustine, particularly during the Second Seminole War. The city's historic (and endangered) Sea Wall was built in the 1830s, 1840s and 1850s by West Point engineers who went on to design military fortifications for both sides in the Civil War. Many black Union soldiers either came from St. Augustine, or settled there after the war, providing a leadership cadre for the community known as Lincolnville that was established in 1866. Many of the city's old cemeteries feature the distinctive marble tombstones marked "USCT" – United States Colored Troops.

Florida state militia took the fort at St. Augustine from a small U. S. Army garrison (one soldier) on January 7, 1861. Three days later the state of Florida seceded from the United States. Union troops reoccupied the city on March 11, 1862, putting St. Augustine under Union control. The city was never retaken by Confederate forces.

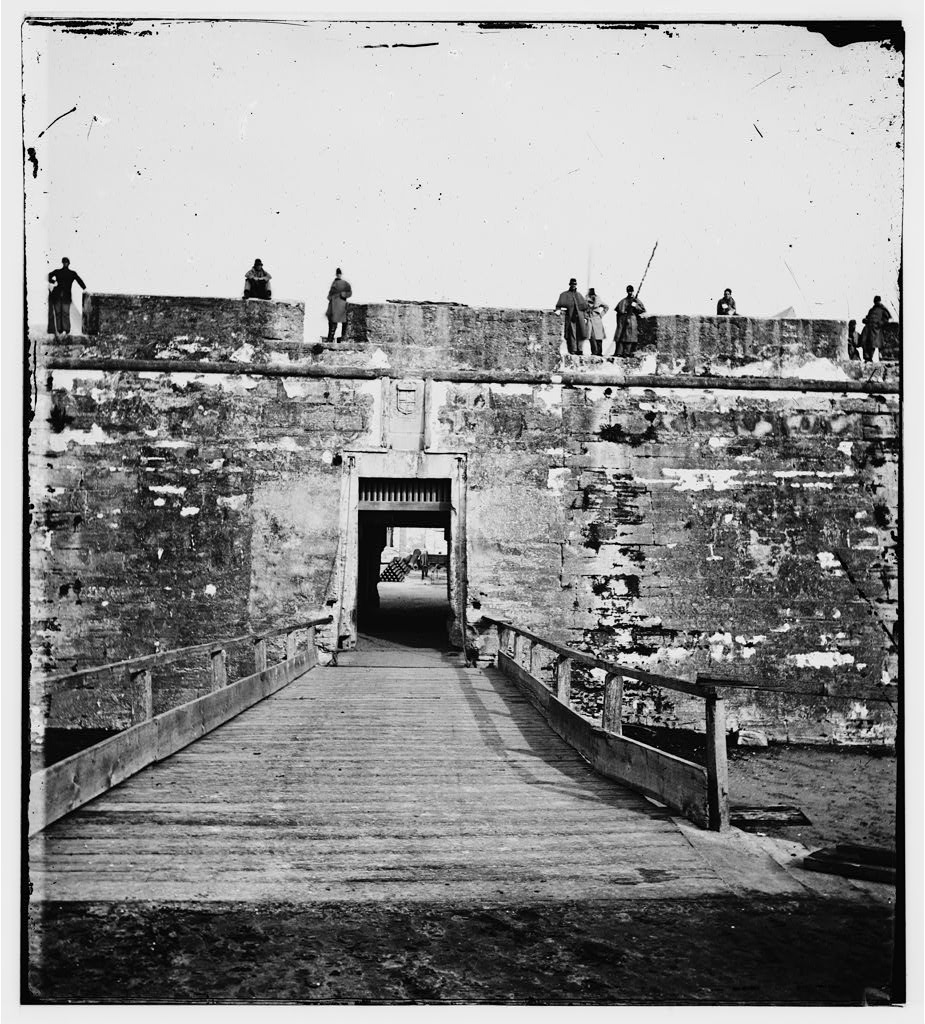
Photograph showing the bridge entering into Fort Marion. Photo by Sam A. Cooley, official U.S. Army photographer

== Early war ==
After the assault on Harper's Ferry by abolitionist John Brown in 1859, St. Augustine Examiner owner Matthias Andreu devised the motto "Equality in the Union and Nothing Else", feeding a sense of mistrust towards the federal government that the paper promised could lead to war between the states. Once Abraham Lincoln was elected United States president solely by Northern states (not a single vote for Lincoln was recorded in the entire state of Florida), Andreu saw no hope in the south remaining with the north, and promoted secession, lest "violent abolitionists" incite slaves to riot.

On January 7, 1861, roughly 125 militiamen, including 25 from the town of Fernandina, came to capture Fort Marion, a coquina fort built by the Spanish between 1672 and 1695. The lone United States army sergeant guarding the fort gave the Southerners the keys after demanding, and receiving, a receipt from the Confederacy. Most of the forts cannons were then removed and sent to locations deemed more strategically important. This included four cannon sent to Fernandina and four to the mouth of the St. Johns River, with others being sent elsewhere, leaving only five cannon to defend St. Augustine.

When news reached St. Augustine on January 12, 1861, that Florida had seceded, the city celebrated with ceremonial flag raisings, church bells, and musket volleys, followed that night by torchlight parade and bonfires. The following Lent saw greater passion in following the restrictions than previous years. Meanwhile, the Examiner led an effort to proclaim anything that spoke against secession as treasonous. Initial support for the war waned when taxes were increased for the war effort and revenues derived from the new tourist trade came to a standstill.

Several ships that served as blockade runners also used St. Augustine as a port. These ships included the Garibaldi, the St. Mary's, and the Jefferson Davis, which had captured several prizes until it ran aground in St. Augustine Harbor in mid-August, 1861.

Although situated 150 miles away, the residents of St. Augustine heard of the Battle of Port Royal on November 7, 1861. Troops on a Union ship just upwind from the battle saw flashes of light, but often heard nothing.

The majority of Confederate forces from St. Augustine consisted of a company called the St. Augustine Blues. When they left the city in March 1862 their number ranged between eighty and a hundred men. As part of the Third Florida Regiment, they lost many of their men at the Battle of Perryville in Kentucky in October 1862. By the time of the Battle of Murfreesboro, only ten of the original Blues remained. At the war's end in 1865, only eight were officially captured. However, only seventeen were confirmed killed during the war. The city produced at least one other Confederate unit, the St. Augustine Rifles.

Fort Marion and St. Augustine were seized by Union Marines and sailors landing unopposed on March 11, 1862. The USS Wabash and USS Mohican were spotted entering the bay on March 9 by the occupying Confederate forces. Knowing they could not adequately defend the city, the Confederate forces withdrew on March 10 at 10 pm. Federal control was limited to the town itself. After several woodcutters were ambushed outside of town, the garrison resorted to chopping down most of the fences, old frame homes, and trees in town to make firewood.

After capturing St. Augustine, the Federals established a post office to resume regular communication with the North. They also imported a supply of small denomination U.S. currency, which was used to replace the "wretched paper currency of the rebellion."

== Late war ==
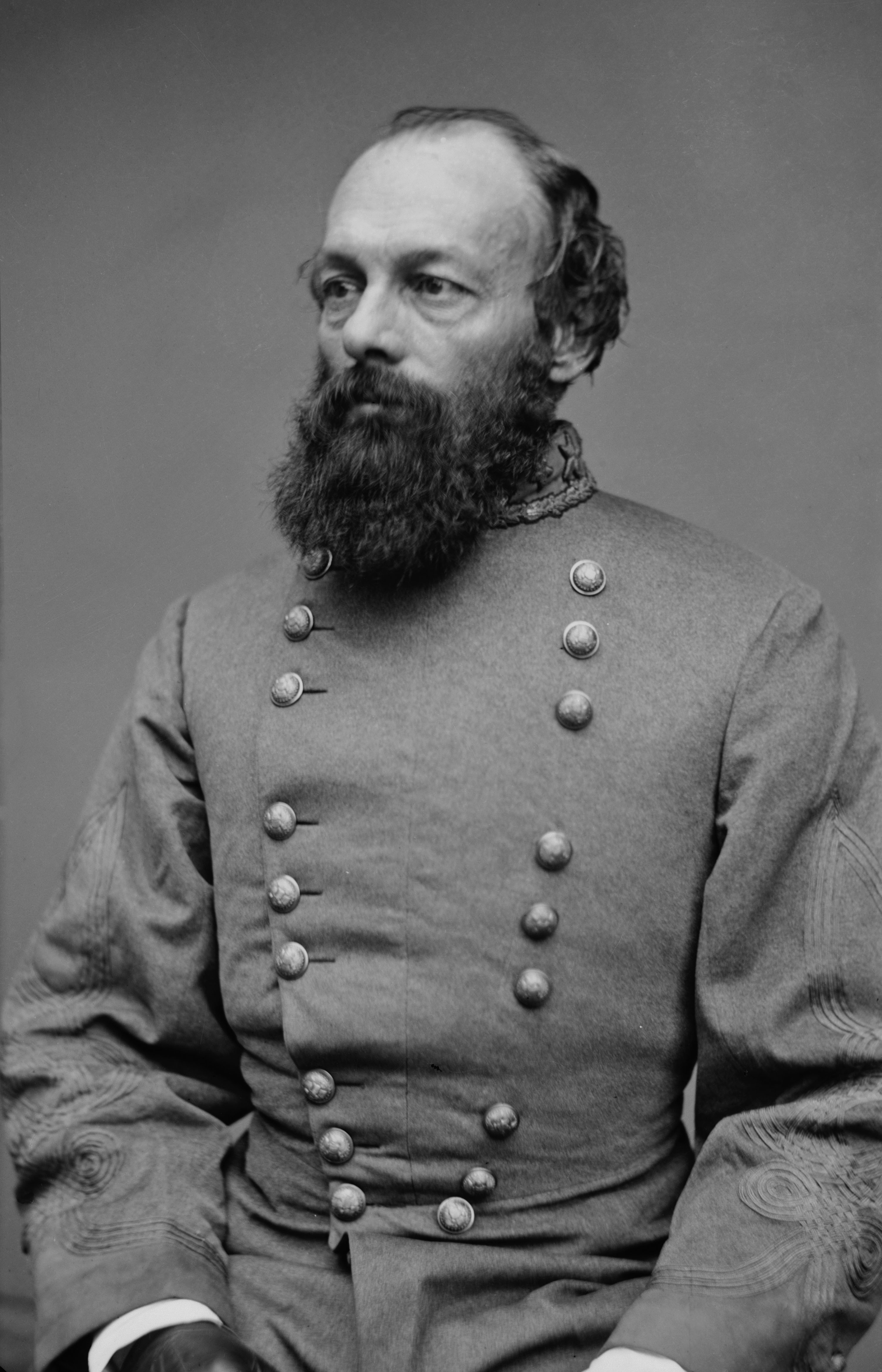
St. Augustine native Edmund Kirby-Smith

Other notable contributions to the Confederate war effort were at least three generals: Edmund Kirby-Smith, Francis A. Shoup and William Wing Loring, although only Kirby-Smith was born there. During the war, St. Augustinian Stephen Vincent Benet, grandfather of American author Stephen Vincent Benét, continued to serve in the U.S. Army as an instructor at West Point with the rank of captain, eventually rising to the rank of Brigadier General. His younger brother James served in the Confederate Army—one of many examples of families divided in their loyalty during the war. Edmund Jackson Davis, while born in St. Augustine, moved to Galveston, Texas, as a child. After the war began, he crossed over to Mexico where he raised the 1st Texas Cavalry (USA), served as its colonel, and was later promoted to Brigadier General of U.S. Volunteers. In 1869, he was elected governor of Texas and served as such for four years.

Unlike nearby Jacksonville, which had four separate control changes, the Confederates did not attempt retaking St. Augustine. Confederate general Robert E. Lee, well familiar with the area after having charted the coastline years before, said that the city "serves only as an invitation for an attack". Union forces strengthened the fort during the war, in case of attack. A heavy presence of U.S. Army forces would remain through Reconstruction and until the end of the Spanish–American War, always as an important part of the local economy and social life. Many Union soldiers settled permanently in St. Augustine and intermarried with local families. Several served as mayors of the city. Lieutenant Foster, a Union officer, married Miss Sanchez, from a family of Confederate firebrands, and their son, General J. Clifford R. Foster, served as Adjutant General of Florida for most of the first quarter of the twentieth century.

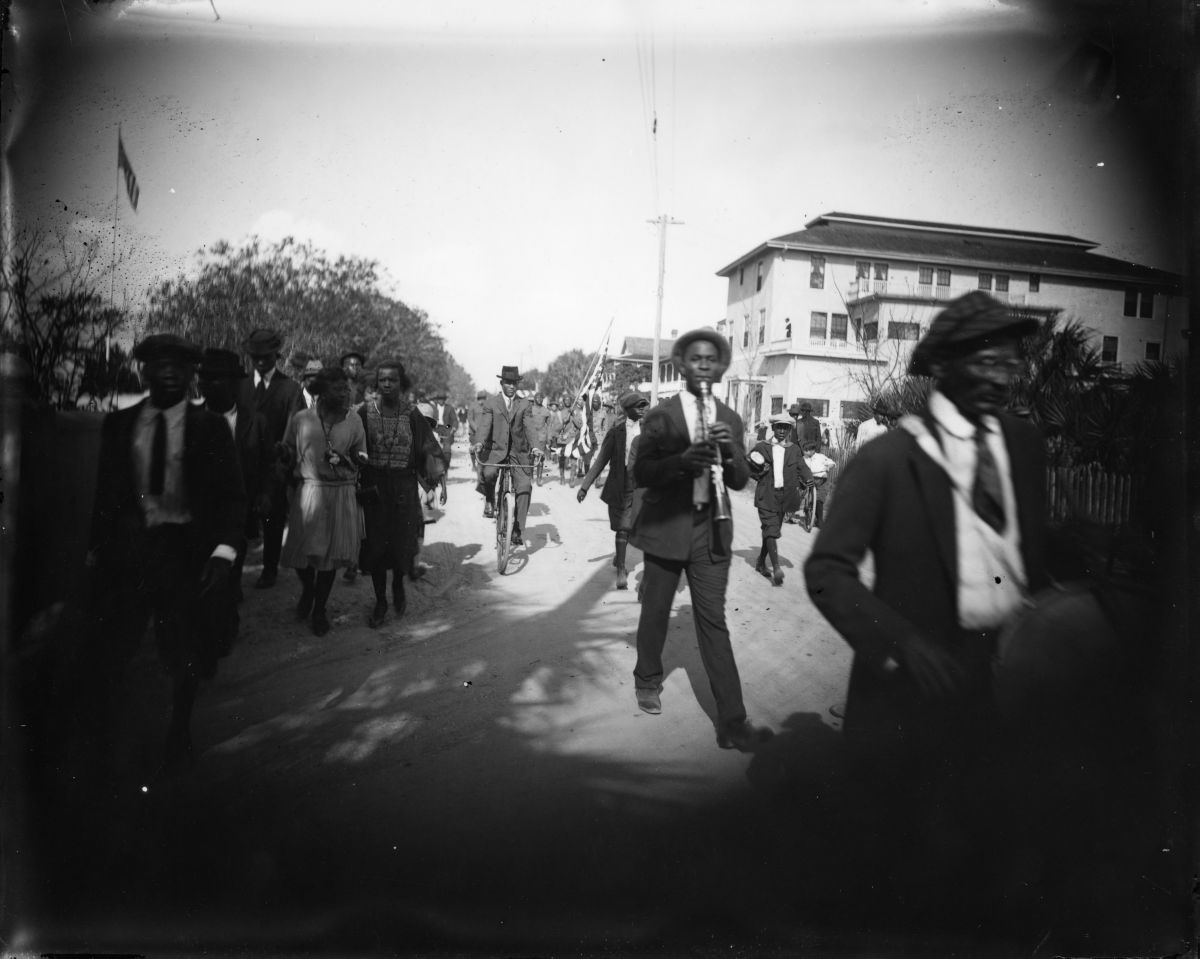
St. Augustine residents commemorating Emancipation Day

Union forces enjoyed the city. The Seventh New Hampshire Volunteers' historian said that living in St. Augustine was good for the health of his fellow soldiers, and regretted when ordered to leave the city. Another benefit from the Union presence was that Sam A. Cooley, an official photographer of the U.S. Army's Department of the South, undertook the first major effort to take pictures of many of the city's buildings, which proved valuable a century later when efforts were made to restore many of St. Augustine's historic buildings. Among the interesting Union soldiers to serve in St. Augustine were Joseph Hawley, later governor and senator from Connecticut, Francis Wayland Parker, pioneer of progressive education in the United States, Joseph C. Abbott, later senator from North Carolina, and Anthony Comstock, who became one of the nation's most notorious bookburner and anti-pornography crusader.

Thanks to the general deprivations of war as well as, specifically, the Union blockade, many of St. Augustine's citizens suffered from a lack of food and some were on the verge of starvation. After the arrival of the Union army, even Confederate sympathizers, including Mrs. Joseph Lee Smith, mother of General Kirby-Smith, traded with the Federals for food.

On January 1, 1863, Abraham Lincoln's Emancipation Proclamation came into effect for slaves in areas still under Confederate control. A bell and marker on the grounds of Old St. Augustine Village celebrates the event, and for many generations, Emancipation Day, on January 1, was a major celebration in the black community of the Ancient City.

On March 9, 1863, a small skirmish occurred when 80 Confederate troops attacked an advanced picket guard just north of St. Augustine. They were driven off by 120 men from the 7th New Hampshire Infantry.

== Post-war ==
For many decades after the war, St. Augustine had two chapters of the Grand Army of the Republic—one black and one white. In the Flagler era, two prominent Union generals, John McAllister Schofield and Martin D. Hardin retired, sequentially, to the same house at 20 Valencia Street. Saved by public protest from a demolition attempt by Flagler College in the 1980s, the building has come to be known as "The Union Generals House." Hardin, a protégé of Abraham Lincoln, was one of the last surviving generals on either side when he died in St. Augustine on December 12, 1923. He is buried at the U.S. National Cemetery on Marine Street under a large cross, and a marker on the La Leche Chapel on the grounds of the Mission of Nombre de Dios notes that the building was restored in General Hardin's honor by his widow.
