= 2nd United States Colored Infantry Regiment =

2nd United States Colored Infantry
- Active: June 20, 1863 – January 5, 1866
- Disbanded: January 5, 1866
- Country: United States
- Allegiance: Union
- Branch: Infantry
- Size: Regiment
- Engagements: American Civil War: Battle of Fort Myers; Battle of Natural Bridge

The 2nd United States Colored Infantry was an infantry regiment that served in the Union Army during the American Civil War. The regiment was composed of African American enlisted men commanded by white officers and was authorized by the Bureau of Colored Troops which was created by the United States War Department on May 22, 1863.

== Service history ==
The 2nd U.S. Colored Infantry was organized in Arlington, Virginia June 20 through November 11, 1863 and mustered in for three-year service. The regiment of around 900 men arrived in Key West on February 22, 1864 as replacements for the 47th Pennsylvania Volunteers, where they encountered hostility from many of the locals. The unit established a regimental headquarters and was encamped at Fort Taylor, under the jurisdiction of the Department of the Gulf.

The unit was then assigned to the Department of Florida until January 1866. The 2nd U.S. Colored Infantry mustered out of service January 5, 1866.

== Detailed service ==
Ordered to the Department of the Gulf December 1863. Duty at New Orleans, La., and Ship Island, Miss., until February 13, 1864. Ordered to Key West, Fla., February 13. Affair at Tampa, Fla., May 5. Operations on the west coast of Florida July 1–31. Expedition from Fort Myers to Bayport July 1–4. Expedition from Cedar Key to St. Andrew's Bay July 20–29. Fort Taylor August 21. Station Four February 13, 1865. Attack on Fort Myers February 20. Operations in the vicinity of St. Mark's February 21-March 7. East River Bridge March 4–5. Newport Bridge March 5–6. Natural Bridge March 6. Duty in District of Florida until January 1866.

== Casualties ==
The regiment lost a total of 173 men during service; 3 officers and 24 enlisted men killed or mortally wounded, 11 officers and 135 enlisted men died of disease.

== See also ==
- List of United States Colored Troops Civil War Units
- United States Colored Troops
