= John T. Lesley =

American politician (1835–1913)

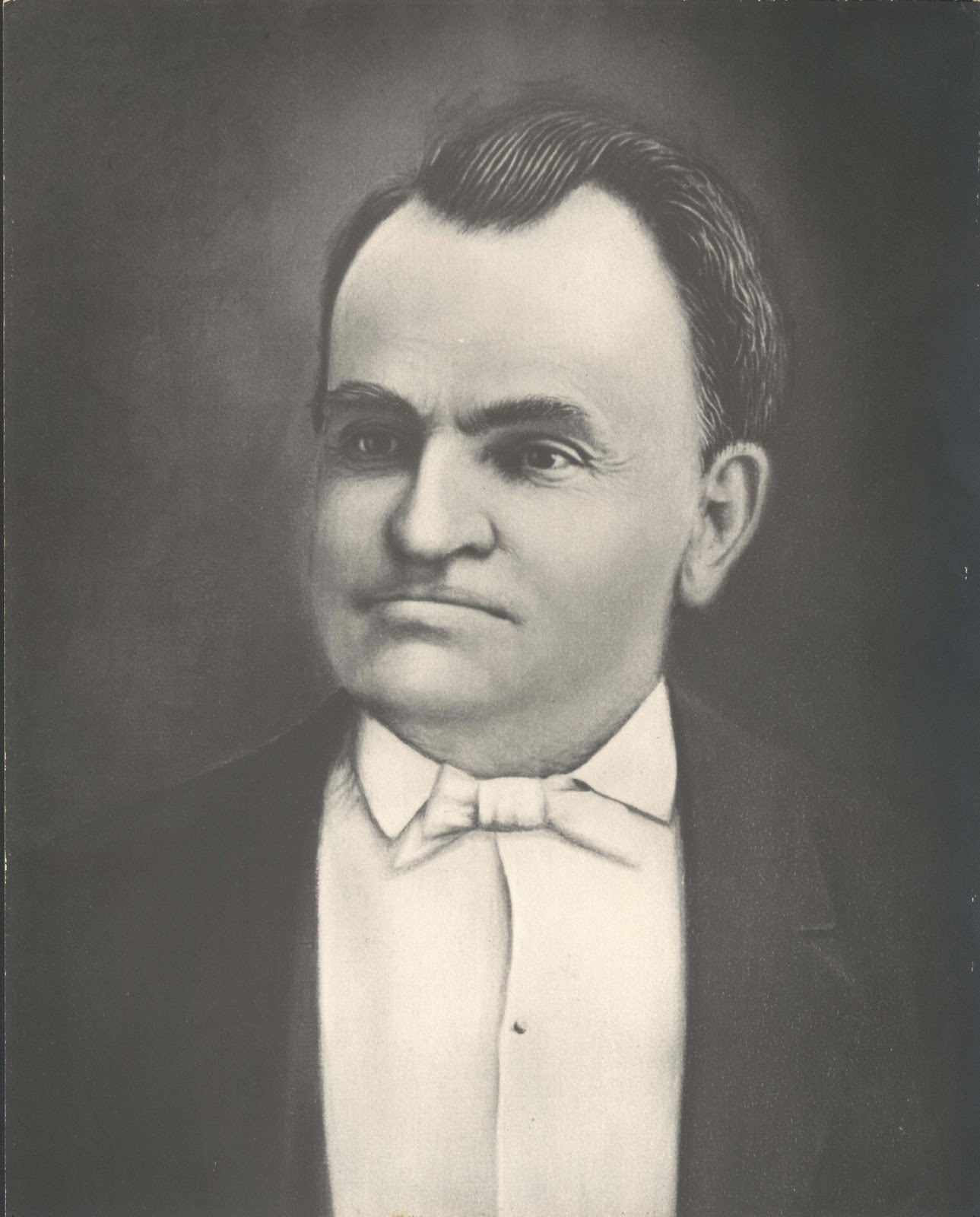
- Lesley in the late 19th Century

12th Mayor of Tampa
- In office October 4, 1869 – March 1, 1870
- Preceded by: Josiah A. Ferris
- Succeeded by: John A. Henderson

Personal details
- Born: May 12, 1835 Madison County, Florida
- Died: July 13, 1913 (aged 78) Tampa, Florida
- Resting place: Oaklawn Cemetery
- Party: Democrat
- Spouse: Margaret Brown Tucker

Military service
- Allegiance: United States of America; Confederate States of America
- Branch/service: United States Army; Confederate States Army
- Years of service: 1855 (USA); 1862-1863
- Rank: Captain
- Unit: 4th Florida Infantry; 1st. Special Cavalry Battalion
- Battles/wars: Third Seminole War; American Civil War

John Thomas Lesley (May 12, 1835 – July 13, 1913) was a cattleman and pioneer in Tampa, Florida. He was the son of Leroy G. Lesley, a pioneer Florida settler who was a minister, soldier, cattleman and Tampa civic leader. J.T. Lesley fought in the Third Seminole War and was a captain of Company K of the 4th Florida Infantry Regiment in the Confederate Army during the Civil War. Lesley formed his own volunteer company the "Sunny South Guards", and commanded a unit of the "Cow Cavalry", until he was wounded and replaced by W. B. Henderson. After the war he became a state senator. Prior to the Civil War he owned three slaves.

Major William Iredell Turner and Lesley (then a major) helped Confederate Secretary of State Judah P. Benjamin escape following the collapse of the Confederacy and hid Benjamin in a swamp behind Major Turner's House. He remained there for several days until they were sure the area was cleared of Federal soldiers. Benjamin was then transported to Gamble Mansion. Lesley was one of the original owners of the Tampa Street Railway.

His marriage to William T. Brown's daughter Margaret created what would become a powerful dynasty in business, politics and agriculture. Lesley's son William T. Lesley was Sheriff and a member of the Florida Constitutional Convention of 1885. Theodore Lesley, John T. Lesley's other son, was a county historian and preservationist.

Lesley is buried in downtown Tampa's Oaklawn Cemetery.
