= HSBC station =

HSBC

General information
- Location: Morgan Street and Old Water Street; Tampa, FL
- Coordinates: 27°56′30.8″N 82°27′7.0″W
- Owner: HARTline
- Platforms: 1 island platform
- Tracks: 2

Construction
- Structure type: at-grade
- Parking: yes
- Accessible: yes

History
- Opened: October 20, 2002

Services
Preceding station	HART	Following station
Dick Greco Plaza toward Whiting	TECO Line	Benchmark International Arena toward Centennial Park
Location

HSBC is a TECO Line station located in Tampa, Florida. It is located at Morgan Street and Old Water Street.

== See also ==
- Light rail in the United States
- List of streetcar systems in the United States
- Streetcars in North America
- Transportation in Florida
