= Streetcar Society station =

Streetcar Society
- View of Streetcar Society station from the western pedestrian bridge over Central Ybor station.

General information
- Location: 15th Street and 8th Avenue; Ybor City, FL
- Coordinates: 27°57′39.7″N 82°26′35.8″W
- Owner: HARTline
- Platforms: 1 side platform
- Tracks: 1

Construction
- Structure type: at-grade
- Parking: yes
- Accessible: yes

History
- Opened: October 20, 2002

Services
Preceding station	HART	Following station
Cadrecha Plaza toward Whiting	TECO Line	Centro Ybor toward Centennial Park
Location

Streetcar Society is a TECO Line station located in Ybor City, Florida. There is one side platform and one track on the northwest corner of 15th Street and 8th Avenue. The track and platform is situated on a concrete slab on the north side of 8th Avenue. The station is one block west of Centro Ybor station.

== See also ==
- Light rail in the United States
- List of streetcar systems in the United States
- Streetcars in North America
- Transportation in Florida
