= Cadrecha Plaza station =

Streetcar station in Ybor City, Florida, US

Cadrecha Plaza

General information
- Location: 13th Street and 7th Avenue; Ybor City, FL
- Coordinates: 27°57′38.5″N 82°26′43.7″W
- Owner: HARTline
- Platforms: 1 side platform
- Tracks: 1

Construction
- Structure type: at-grade
- Parking: yes
- Accessible: yes

History
- Opened: October 20, 2002

Services
Preceding station	HART	Following station
Port Tampa Bay toward Whiting	TECO Line	Streetcar Society toward Centennial Park
Location

Cadrecha Plaza is a TECO Line station located in Ybor City, Florida. It is located at 13th Street and 7th Avenue. The station is the westernmost stop in Ybor City, and is located next to Jose Marti Park.

== See also ==
- Light rail in the United States
- List of streetcar systems in the United States
- Streetcars in North America
- Transportation in Florida
