= Port Tampa Bay station =

Port Tampa Bay

General information
- Location: McKay Street and Channelside Drive; Tampa, FL
- Coordinates: 27°57′5.7″N 82°26′43.7″W
- Owner: HART
- Platforms: 1 island platform
- Tracks: 2

Construction
- Structure type: at-grade
- Parking: yes
- Accessible: yes

History
- Opened: October 20, 2002
- Former names: Port Authority; Port Tampa Bay

Services
Preceding station	HART	Following station
York Street toward Whiting	TECO Line	Cadrecha Plaza toward Centennial Park
Location

Port Tampa Bay (also known as Publix) is a TECO Line station located in Tampa, Florida. It is located at McKay Street and Channelside Drive.

The streetcar stop is designed to serve the Tampa Cruise Ports at the Port of Tampa Bay.

== See also ==
- Light rail in the United States
- List of streetcar systems in the United States
- Streetcars in North America
- Transportation in Florida
