= York Street station (Tampa) =

American streetcar station

York Street

General information
- Location: York Street and Channelside Drive; Tampa, FL
- Coordinates: 27°56′53.4″N 82°26′44.1″W
- Owner: HARTline
- Platforms: 1 island platform
- Tracks: 2

Construction
- Structure type: at-grade
- Parking: yes

History
- Opened: October 20, 2002

Services
Preceding station	HART	Following station
The Florida Aquarium toward Whiting	TECO Line	Port Tampa Bay toward Centennial Park
Location

York Street is a TECO Line streetcar station in Tampa, Florida. It is located at York Street and Channelside Drive.

== See also ==
- Light rail in the United States
- List of streetcar systems in the United States
- Streetcars in North America
- Transportation in Florida
