= Benchmark International Arena station =

Benchmark International Arena
- The Carnival Legend docked in the Ybor Tuning Basin as seen from what was then the Tampa Tribune TECO streetcar stop.

General information
- Location: Beneficial Drive and Channelside Drive; Tampa, FL
- Coordinates: 27°56′36.5″N 82°26′54.7″W
- Owner: HARTline
- Platforms: 1 side platform
- Tracks: 1

Construction
- Structure type: at-grade
- Parking: yes
- Accessible: yes

History
- Opened: October 20, 2002

Services
Preceding station	HART	Following station
HSBC toward Whiting	TECO Line	The Florida Aquarium toward Centennial Park
Location

Benchmark International Arena (formerly known as The Tampa Tribune and Amalie Arena) is a TECO Line station located in Tampa, Florida. It is located at Beneficial Drive and Channelside Drive next to Benchmark International Arena, home of the Tampa Bay Lightning of the National Hockey League.

== See also ==
- Light rail in the United States
- List of streetcar systems in the United States
- Streetcars in North America
- Transportation in Florida
