= The Florida Aquarium station =

Streetcar station in Tampa, Florida, US

Coordinates: 27.94573°N 82.44559°W

The Florida Aquarium

General information
- Location: Cumberland Avenue and Channelside Drive; Tampa, FL
- Owner: HARTline
- Platforms: 1 side platform
- Tracks: 1

Construction
- Structure type: at-grade
- Parking: yes
- Accessible: yes

History
- Opened: October 20, 2002
- Former names: Cumberland Avenue

Services
Preceding station	HART	Following station
Benchmark International Arena toward Whiting	TECO Line	York Street toward Centennial Park
Location

The Florida Aquarium (formerly known as Cumberland Avenue) is a TECO Line station located in Tampa, Florida. It is located at Cumberland Avenue and Channelside Drive.

== See also ==
- Light rail in the United States
- List of streetcar systems in the United States
- Streetcars in North America
- Transportation in Florida
