= Dick Greco Plaza =

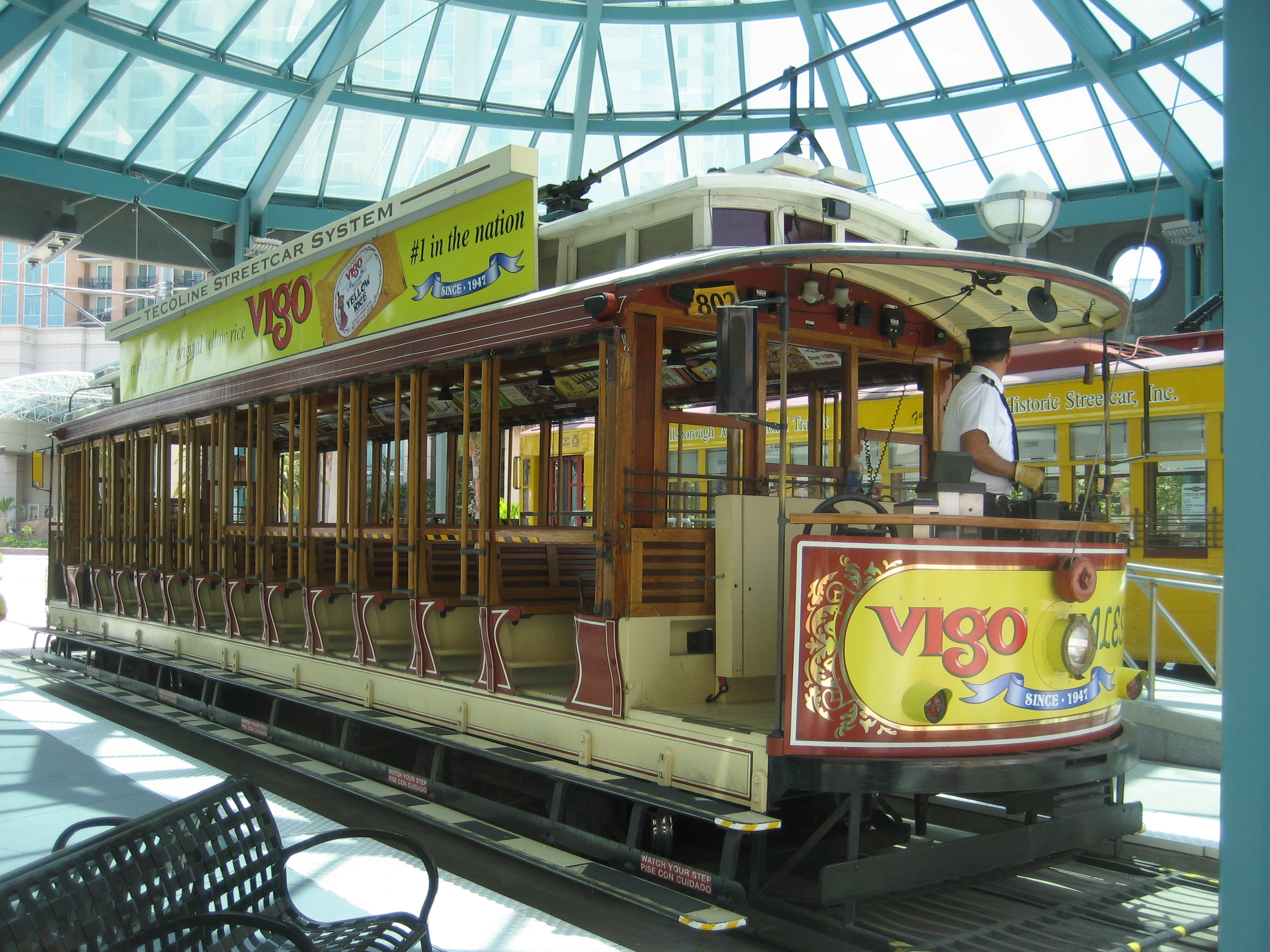

General information
- Coordinates: 27°56′29.5″N 82°27′17.2″W
- Platforms: 2 side platforms, 1 island platform (2 per track)
- Tracks: 2

History
- Opened: 2003

Services
Preceding station	HART	Following station
Hattricks toward Whiting	TECO Line	HSBC toward Centennial Park
Location

Dick Greco Plaza is a HARTline transit center located in the southern end of downtown Tampa across from the Marriott Waterside and the Tampa Convention Center. It was the former terminal station for the TECO Line Streetcar until the opening of the Whiting street station. It still serves as the terminating point for the In-Town Trolley routes. The station opened on January 30, 2003, and cost $3 million to build.

The station was officially dedicated on May 29, 2008, in honor of Dick A. Greco, a former mayor who was instrumental in bringing streetcars back to Tampa after an almost 60-year absence. A statue of Greco sitting on a bench was added just outside.

== See also ==
- Light rail in the United States
- List of streetcar systems in the United States
- Streetcars in North America
- Transportation in Florida
