= Civic Center–Vista station =

Hybrid rail station in Vista, California, United States

Civic Center–Vista
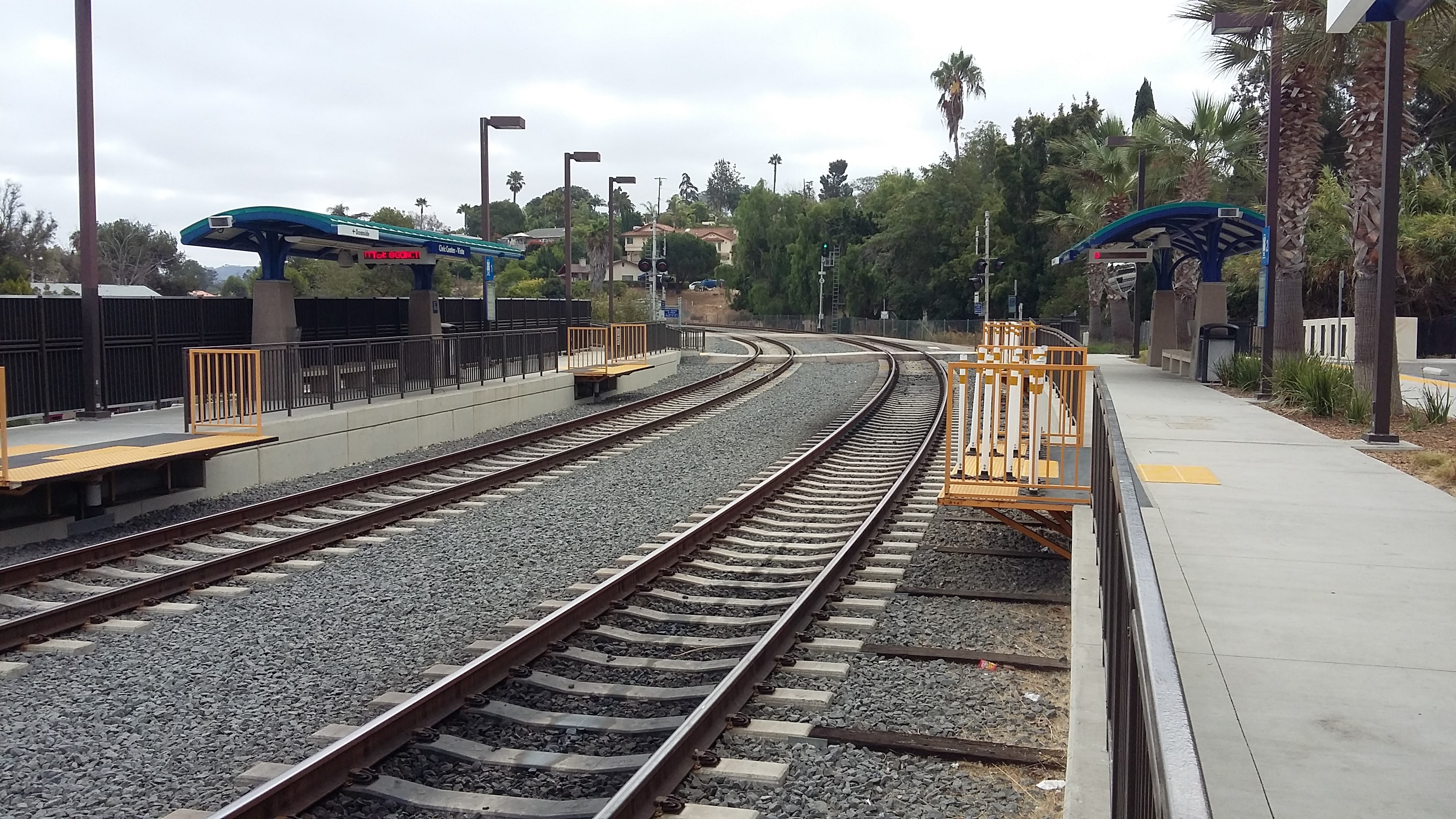
- Looking east from south platform

General information
- Location: 810 Phillips Street; Vista, California
- Coordinates: 33.1902°N 117.2370°W
- Owner: North County Transit District
- Line: Escondido Subdivision
- Platforms: 2 side platforms

Construction
- Accessible: Yes

History
- Opened: March 9, 2008; 18 years ago
- Former names: Escondido Avenue, Civic Center Drive

Services
Preceding station	North County Transit District	Following station
Vista toward Oceanside	SPRINTER	Buena Creek toward Escondido
Location

Civic Center–Vista station (previously known as Escondido Avenue station and Civic Center Drive station) is a station in Vista, California that is served by North County Transit District's SPRINTER hybrid rail line. The station is located at 810 Phillips Street.

Although the Sprinter began service in March 2008, the eastbound platform of the station remained closed for several months due to construction to improve its platform. It finally opened in September of the same year.

The street Escondido Avenue was renamed Civic Center Drive in 2010 in light of the construction of a large city hall complex, and the station's name was changed to reflect this. The station was again renamed Civic Center–Vista to differentiate it from the San Marcos Civic Center station.
