= El Camino Real station =

Hybrid rail station in Oceanside, California, United States

El Camino Real

General information
- Location: 1505 El Camino Real; Oceanside, California
- Coordinates: 33.1997°N 117.3324°W
- Owner: North County Transit District
- Line: Escondido Subdivision
- Platforms: 2 side platforms
- Connections: NCTD: 309

Construction
- Accessible: Yes

History
- Opened: 2008; 18 years ago

Services
Preceding station	North County Transit District	Following station
Crouch Street toward Oceanside	SPRINTER	Rancho Del Oro toward Escondido
Location

El Camino Real station is an at grade station in Oceanside, California that is served by North County Transit District's Sprinter hybrid rail line. The station is located just south of the intersection of Oceanside Boulevard and El Camino Real. The station has two tracks and two side platforms.
