= TECO Line Streetcar =

Streetcar line in Tampa, Florida, US

TECO Line Streetcar System

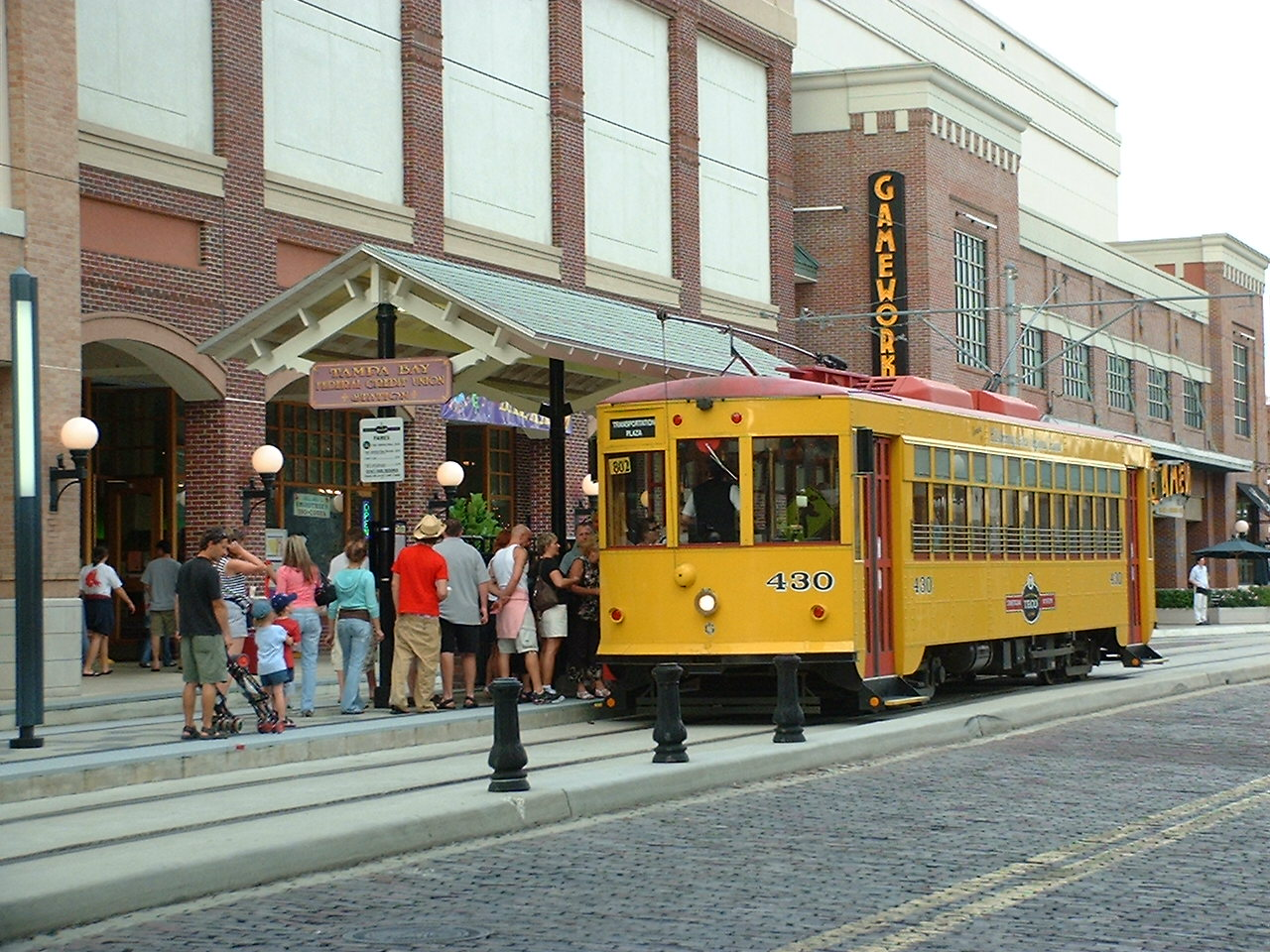
- A TECO streetcar picking up passengers in Ybor City

Overview
- Status: Operational
- Owner: City of Tampa
- Locale: Tampa, Florida
- Termini: Hattricks; Centennial Park
- Stations: 11
- Website: TECO Line Streetcar

Service
- Type: Heritage streetcar
- System: HART
- Services: 1
- Operator: HART
- Rolling stock: Birney
- Daily ridership: 3,000 (weekdays, Q4 2024)
- Ridership: 1,323,715 (2024)

History
- Opened: October 19, 2002

Technical
- Line length: 2.7 mi (4.35 km)
- Character: Fully at-grade
- Track gauge: 4 ft 8 1/2 in (1,435 mm) standard gauge
- Electrification: Overhead line, 600 V DC
1900's Tampa streetcar route maps
- Original 1920-40s (tampaheights.org)
- 1920's Modern Redraw (Jake Berman)

The TECO Line Streetcar System is a heritage streetcar transit line in Tampa, Florida, run by Hillsborough Area Regional Transit (HART), owned by the City of Tampa, and managed by Tampa Historic Streetcar, Inc. It connects Downtown and Channelside to the historic Ybor City district. There is also an "In-Town" trolley-replica bus system that connects Downtown, Channelside, and Harbour Island.

The line opened on October 19, 2002, at 2.4 mi (3.86 km) long, and expanded to 2.7 mi (4.35 km) in 2010, with 11 stations. The system is single-track with several passing sidings, which mostly follows a reserved right-of-way at a cost of 13.7 million per mile. Ten replica historic streetcars and one restored historic streetcar are used on the line. The replica cars themselves cost $745,000 each. A $2.7 million grant from the Florida Department of Transportation awarded in 2018 allowed HART to eliminate fares and increase frequency on the line, causing a significant increase in ridership.

Despite a $67 million state grant, a proposed expansion to 4.0 miles (6.4 km) and 6 more stations has faced funding issues. A county tax to help pay for the development was ruled unconstitutional by the Supreme Court of Florida in 2021 after being passed locally.

== First streetcars in Tampa ==
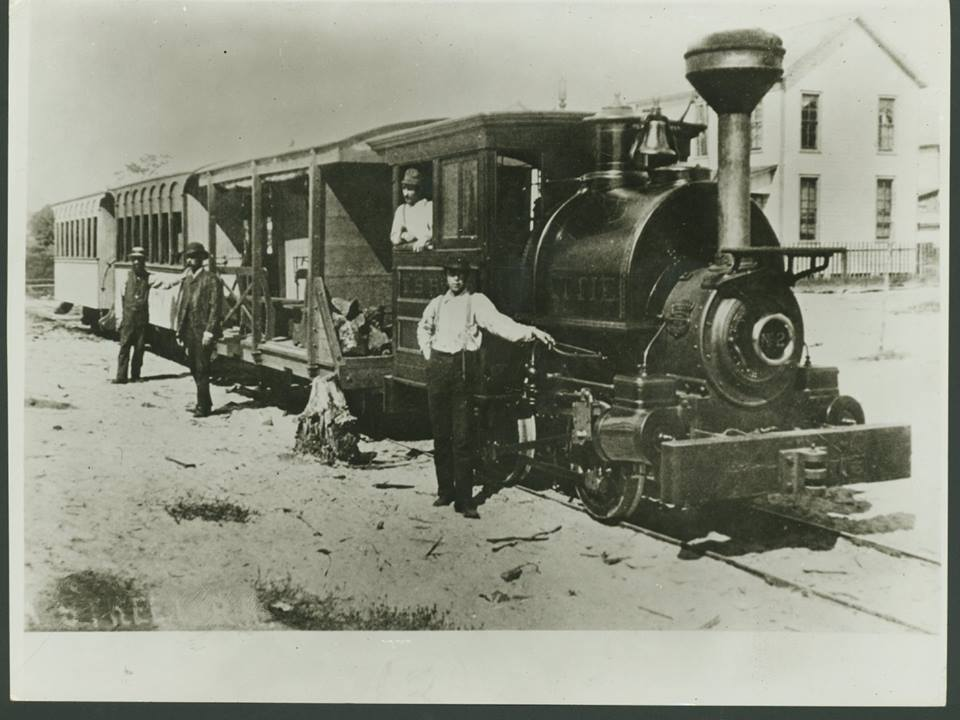
Locomotive and cars of the Tampa Street Railway in early 1890s

The first streetcars in Tampa were operated by the Tampa Street Railway Company between downtown Tampa and Ybor City. The line started operation in 1885, using wood-burning steam engines. In 1892 the Tampa Street Railway Company merged with the Florida Electric Company to form the Tampa Street Railway and Power Company, and converted to electrically powered streetcars in 1893. Also in 1892, a rival company, the Tampa Suburban Company, was organized to compete with the Tampa Street Railway Company, but was blocked from operating by an injunction. A new company, The Consumers Electric Light and Street Railway Company was formed, and soon out-competed the Tampa Railway Company by lowering its fares. The Consumers Electric Light and Street Railway Company bought out the Tampa Street Railway Company in 1894. The company also acquired control of the Tampa and Palmetto Beach Rail Company, becoming the sole streetcar operator in Tampa. The Tampa Electric Company acquired control of the Consumers Electric Light and Street Railway Company in 1899.

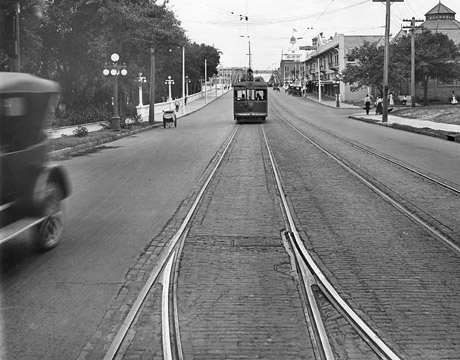
Streetcar approaching Lafayette St. bridge, from in front of Plant Park, 1918

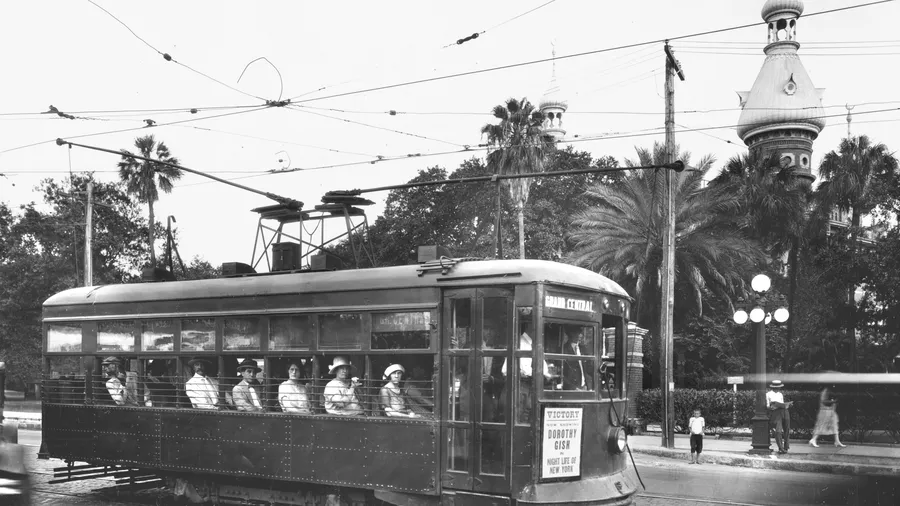
Grand Central Avenue (now Kennedy Boulevard) near the Tampa Bay Hotel, August, 1925

The Tampa Electric Company acquired 21 miles (34 km) of streetcar track with the Consumers Electric Light and Street Railway Company in 1899. After acquiring the Tampa and Sulphur Springs Traction Company in 1913, Tampa Electric had almost 50 miles (80 km) of track, increasing to 53 miles (85 km) by 1926. That year the Tampa Electric system carried almost 24 million passengers.

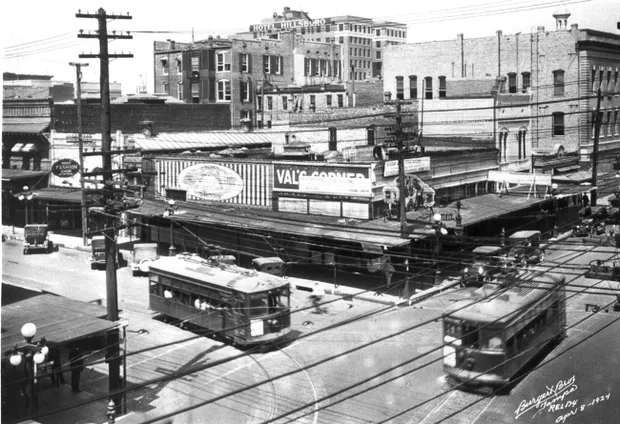
August, 1924

The streetcar system in Tampa was extensive, with at least 13 different connected lines. Each line ran anywhere from every 10 to 30 minutes, from around 5 am till midnight. It was shut down after World War Two, with the city tearing up most of the tracks. The last cars were removed from service some time between 1946 and 1949.

== Revival ==
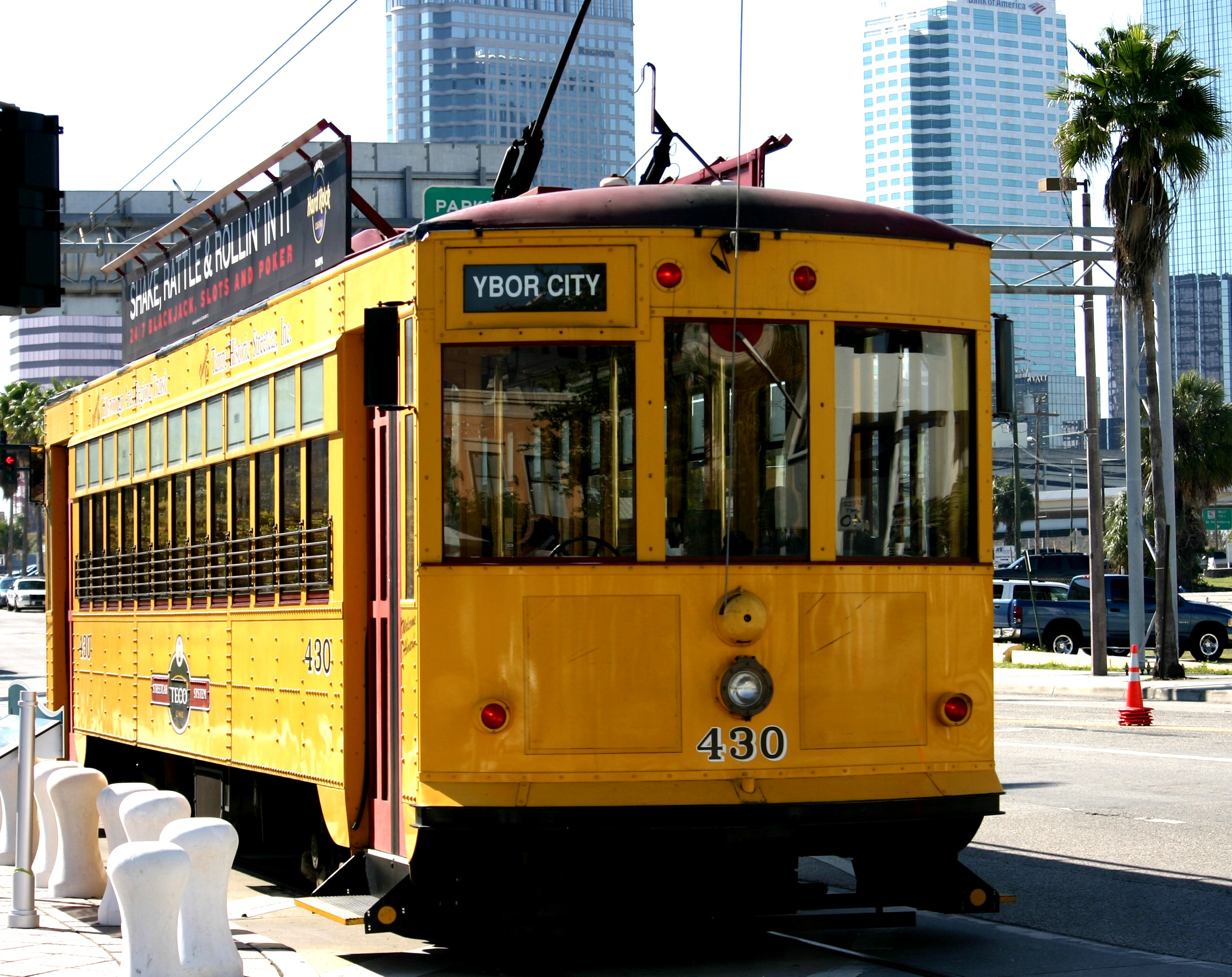
Replica of a Birney Safety Car in Tampa

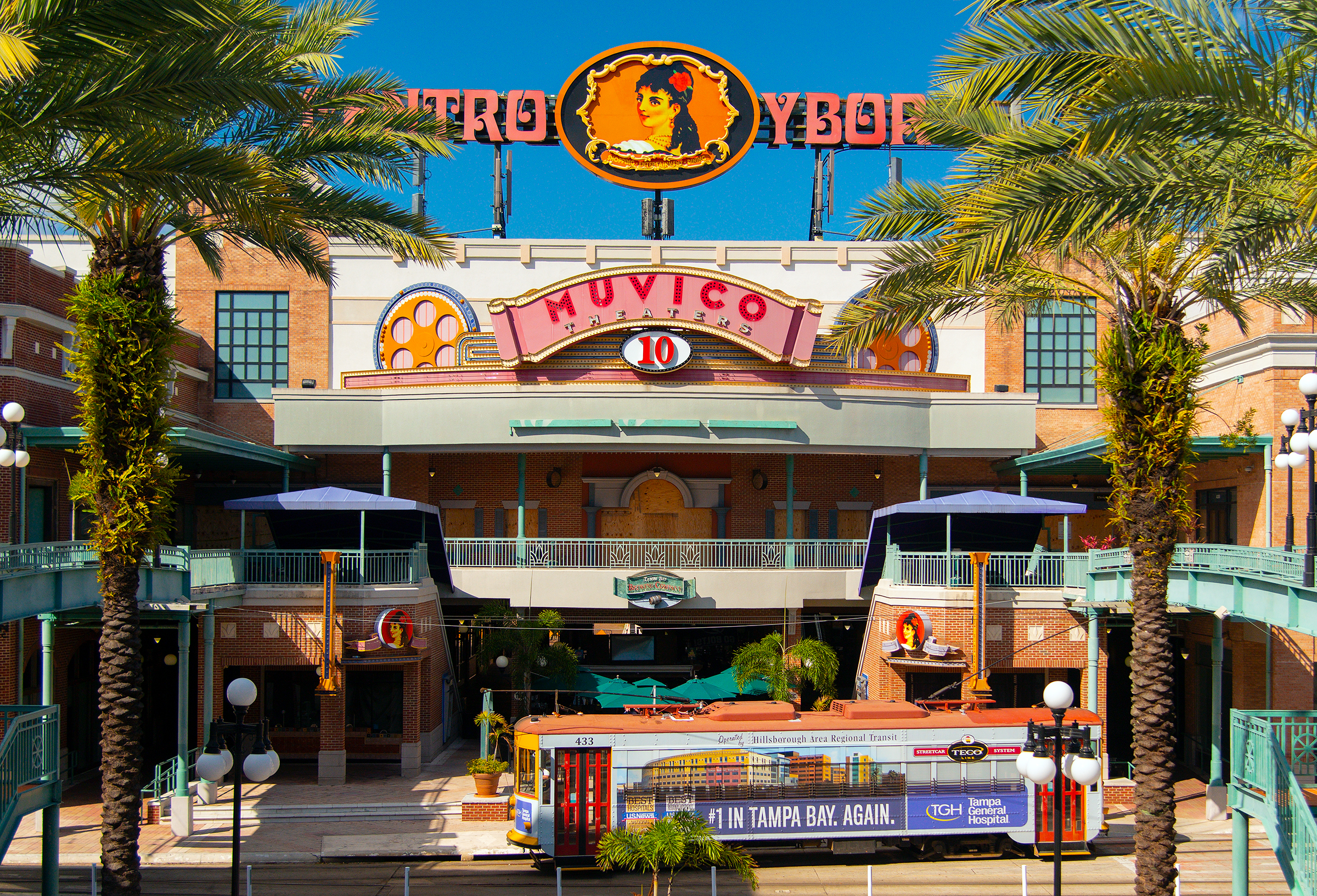
One of the streetcars at Centro Ybor, Ybor City

Streetcars returned to Tampa in 2002, when the initial 2.4 mi (3.86 km) long heritage line was opened. Its operating costs are financed through a special tax assessment (.33 per thousand) on businesses in the streetcar district and a streetcar endowment stemming from settlement money received in 2006 by the city for the demolition of the Harbour Island People Mover.

In its first year of operation, the streetcar carried 420,000 riders, 20% more than projected. In 2005, 434,498 passengers used the streetcar. In 2011, streetcar ridership from October 2011 through May decreased by 8.3 percent to 265,148 with a total for the year of 358,737 riders. In 2015, the streetcar served 285,900 passengers.

A new 0.333 mi (0.54 km) extension, costing $5.5 million, opened for revenue service on December 19, 2010. The extension runs north along Franklin Street to Whiting Street and the Fort Brooke parking garage, connecting the Convention Center as well as the rest of the TECO Line to the downtown core.

== Station list ==
From north to south, the stations are

- Centennial Park; the northern terminus of the line
- Centro Ybor; formerly Tampa Bay Federal Credit Union
- Streetcar Society
- Cadrecha Plaza
- Publix
- York Street
- Cumberland Avenue
- Benchmark International Arena; formerly The Tampa Tribune station
- HSBC
- Dick Greco Plaza; former southern terminus until 2010, connection to Purple Line; signed as Transportation Plaza on destination signs
- Whiting; southern terminus, connection to HART bus routes 1 and 30, access to Fort Brooke parking garage.

== Rolling stock ==
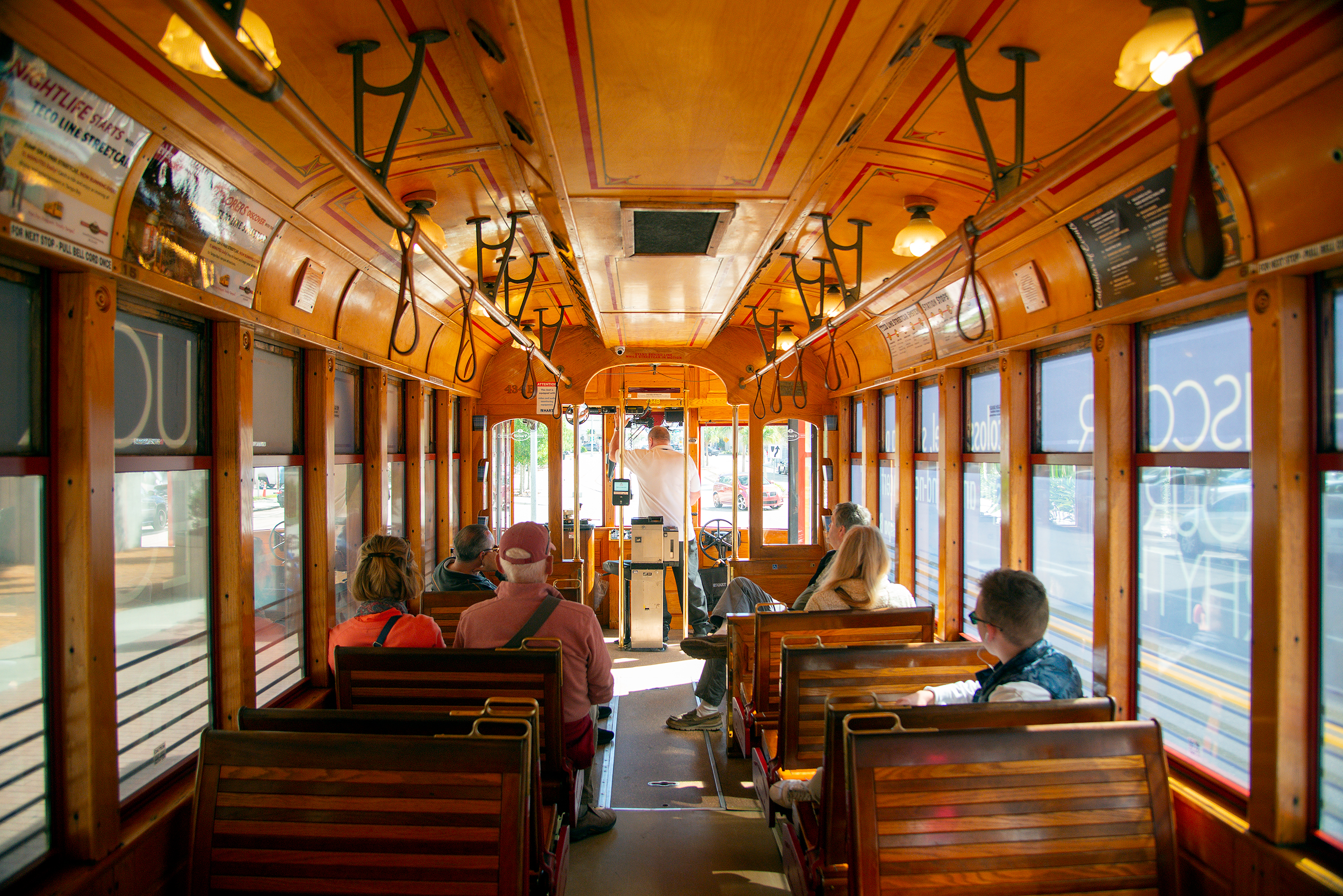
Interior of one of the replica streetcars

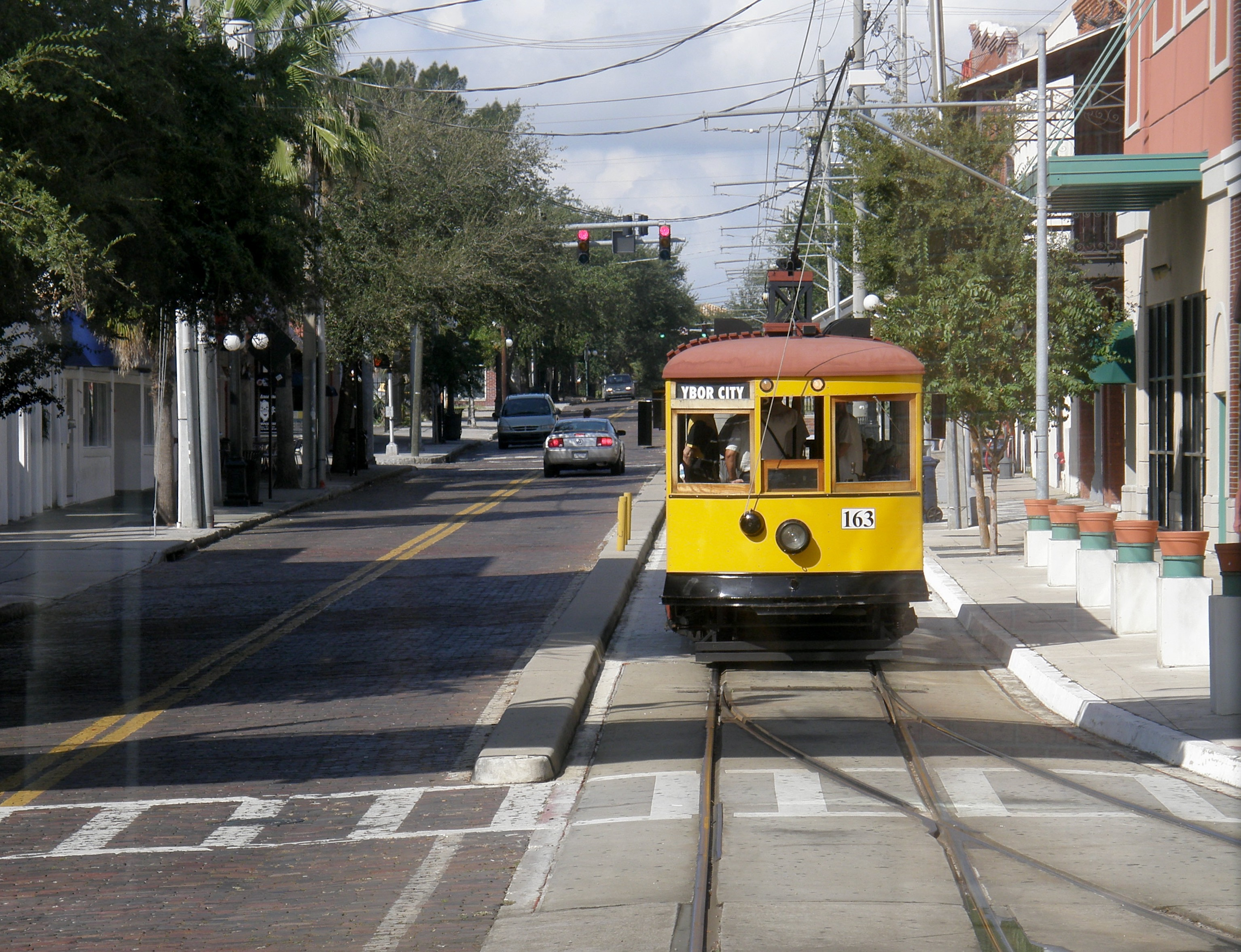
Original Birney-type car 163 just west of Centro Ybor station in 2009

The system originally had had eleven operating streetcars: nine modern replica double-truck Birney cars, one replica open-bench "Breezer" (similar to JG Brill Company cars built for Metropolitan Street Railway of New York), and one restored original Birney car. The replicas were built by the Gomaco Trolley Company in Ida Grove, Iowa. In 2020, the number of operating streetcars was reduced to ten as car #429 was in an accident that damaged it beyond repair. The replica vehicles resemble the originals that were operating in the city from the 1920s to 1946.

The Birney #163 is the fully restored unit and is smaller than the replica models. This streetcar ran on the Tampa & Ybor City Street Railway between 1923 and 1946. It was found in 1991 in Sulphur Springs, a neighborhood in Tampa, where it had been used as an apartment and later a storage shed. Volunteers worked more than 10,000 hours to restore the car to its former condition. It is Florida's only operational historic streetcar.

The replica Birney cars have a welded steel body with cosmetic rivets added to make them look older. The cars are wheelchair-accessible, are air-conditioned and offer free WiFi. The seats are made of wood and are reversible for when the car changes direction. The cars are also equipped with on-board ticket dispensers; however, they do not provide change.

== Financing ==
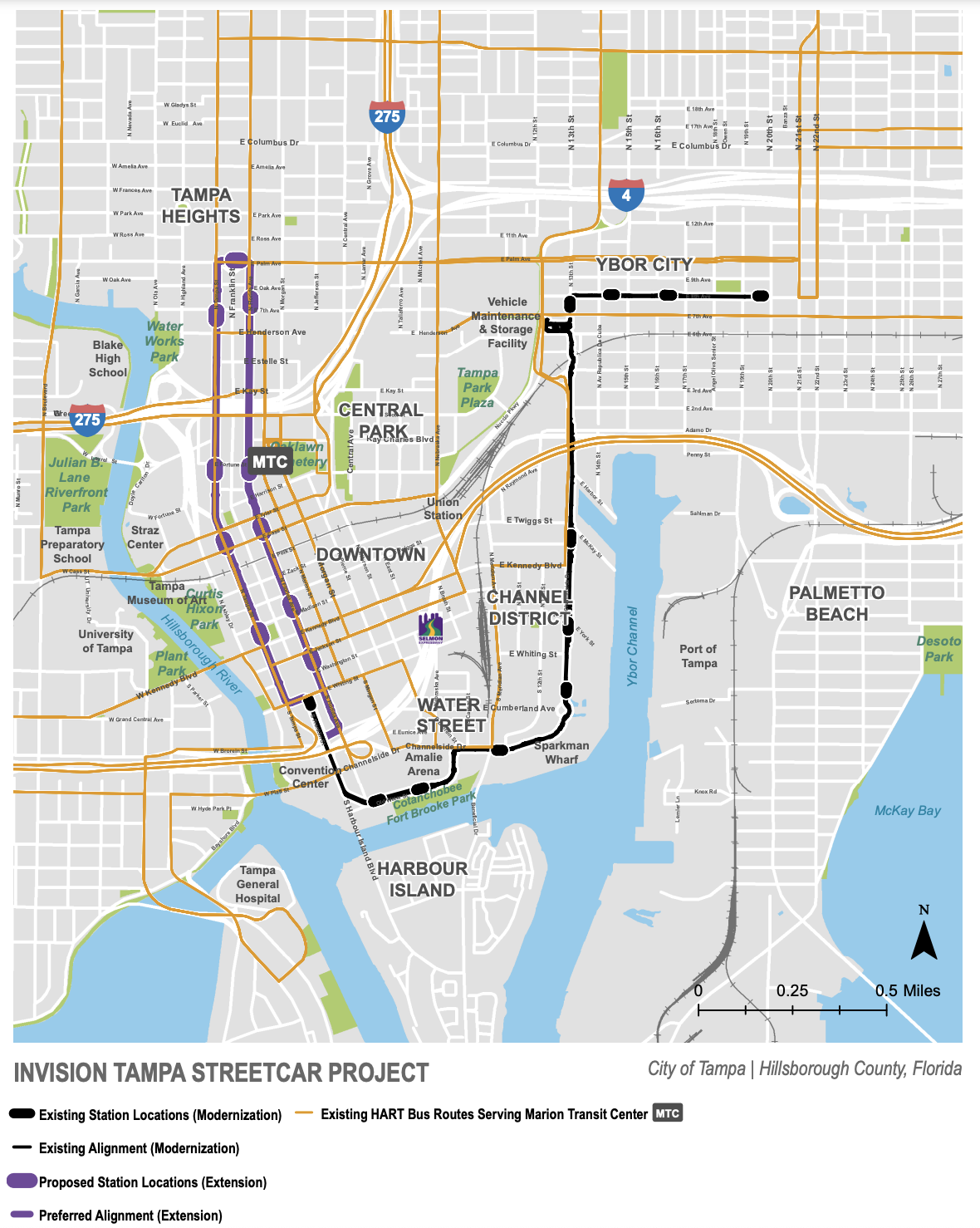
Map of proposed extension

The agency that operates the streetcar is a non-profit. On October 22, 2014, the Tampa Bay Times published an editorial on the leverage a subsidy the Tampa Port Authority gives to the streetcar system. However it also wrote that the system "is not dependent" on the subsidy. They also reported that the system has to pay almost half a million dollars in insurance to cover the risk of streetcars crossing an active freight rail line.

The single-ride adult fare was $2.50 prior to October 2018. Starting that month, fares were dropped for a three year period due to a grant from the Florida Department of Transportation. As a result, ridership on the 2.7 mile line has skyrocketed, with almost three times as many riders in 2019 as in 2018.

Plenary Americas US Holdings Inc has proposed partnering with the city to build a transit line primarily along Cypress Street - connecting Ybor City, Channelside, Downtown, Midtown, Westshore, and the airport. The new line may be called the CrossTampa Transit Connector with 16 stations and two major multipurpose hubs.

The Florida Department of Revenue awarded $67 million for the streetcar expansion on December 8, 2020. The city hoped the updated and extended streetcar service would be up and running by the end of 2026.

In February 2021 the Florida Supreme Court declared a one-percent county-wide sales tax unconstitutional in a 4-1 vote. The "All for Transportation" sales tax was approved by Hillsborough County voters in 2018 and $400 million had already been collected but was left unspent. The funds from this tax were the primary local funding source for the extension project, and thus the future of the project has been placed under review. A new measure to replace the 2018 tax was proposed in 2022. The referendum for a one percent sales tax was rejected by 2022 voters with results of 48.60% For vs. 51.40% Against.

== Gallery ==
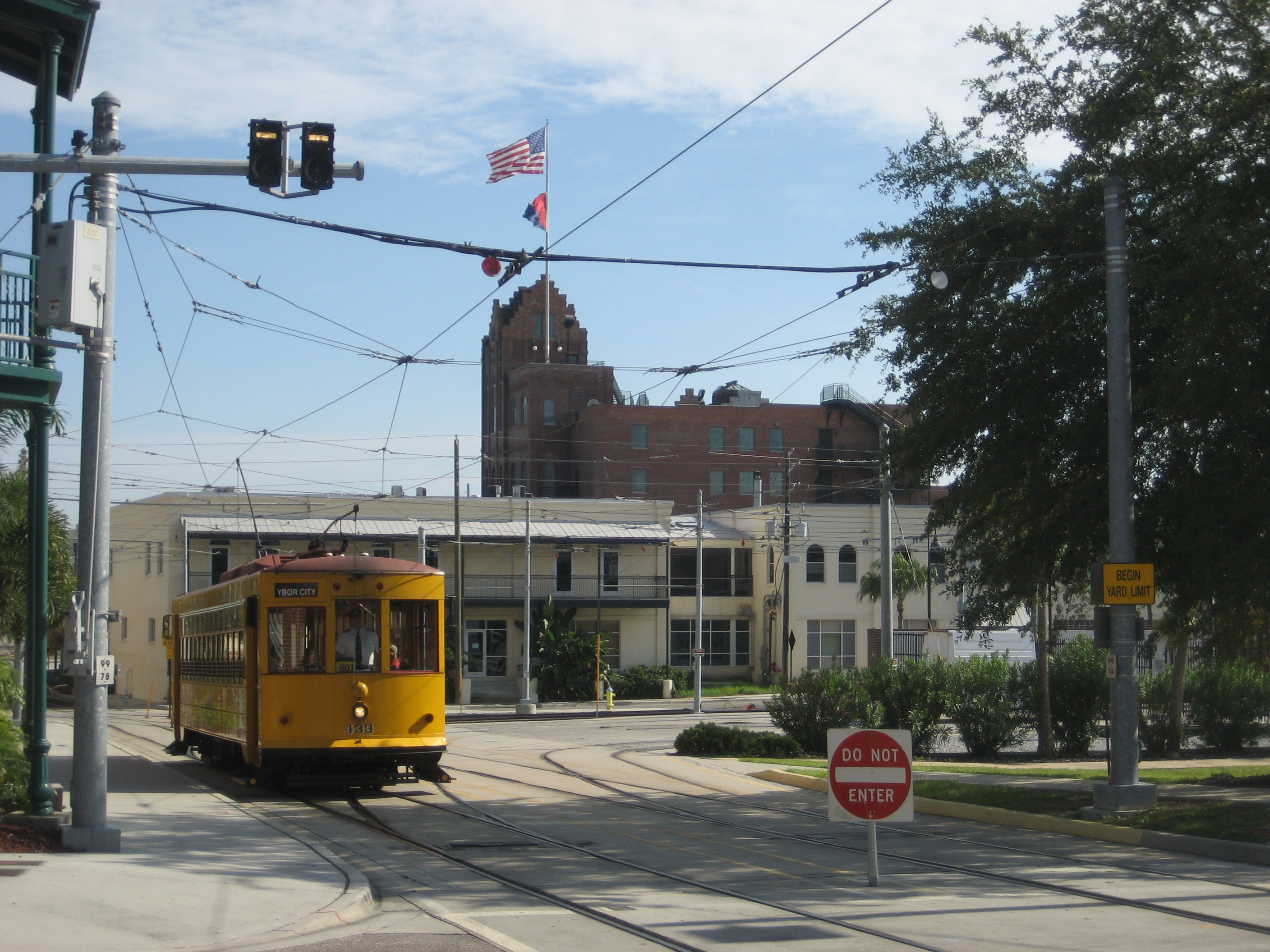
Streetcar in Ybor City

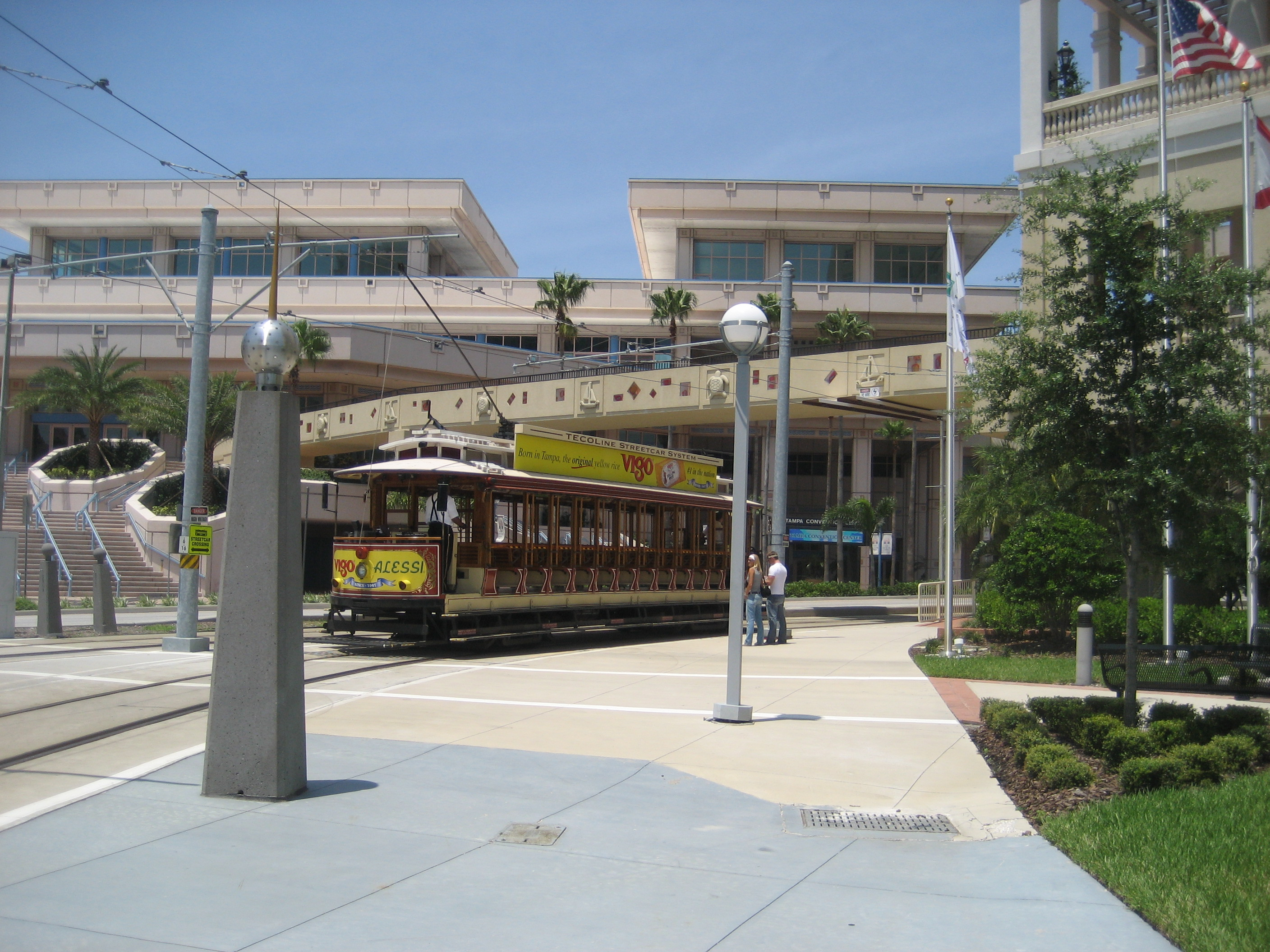
"Breezer" streetcar in downtown Tampa

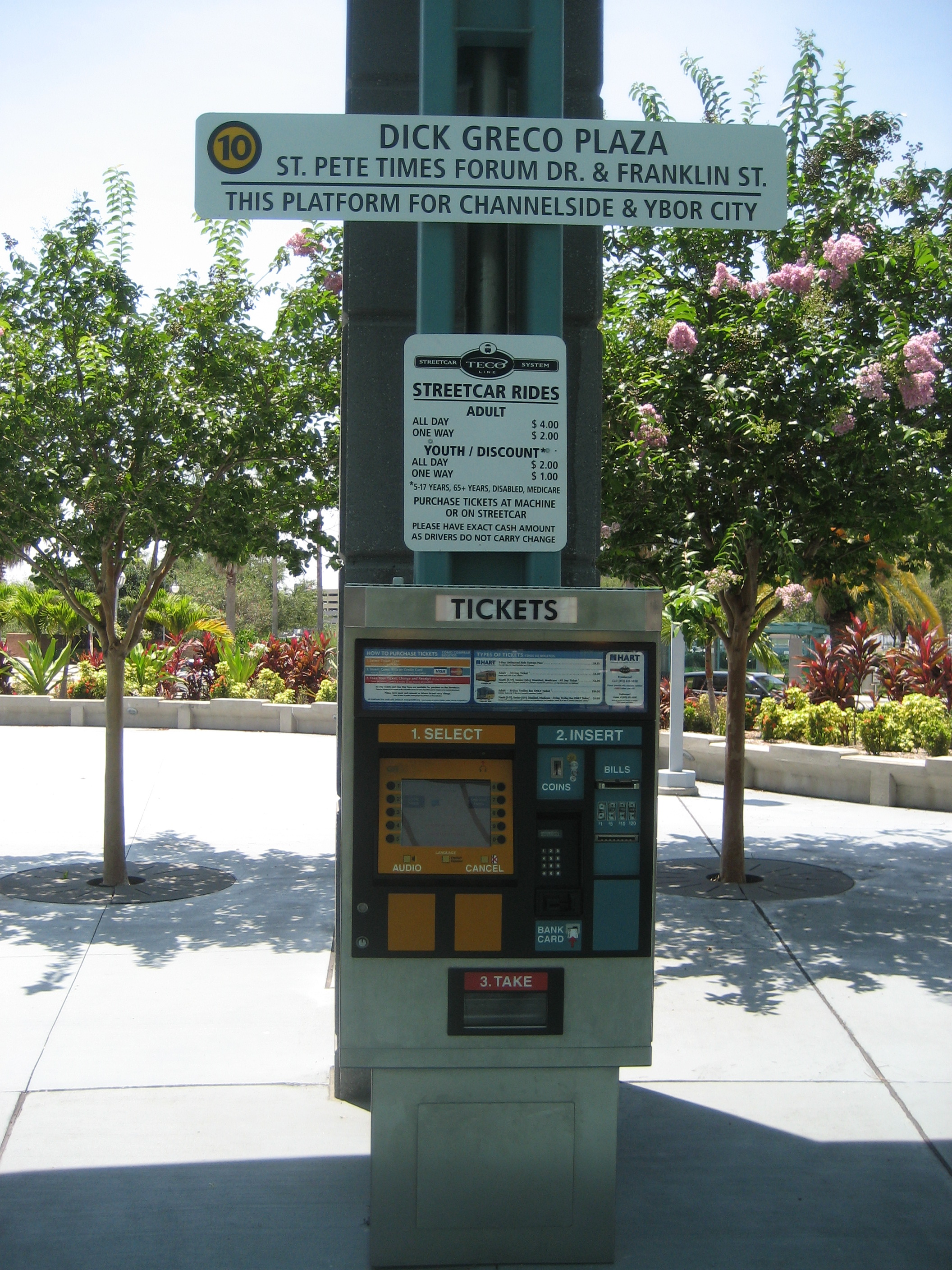
Streetcar ticket machine

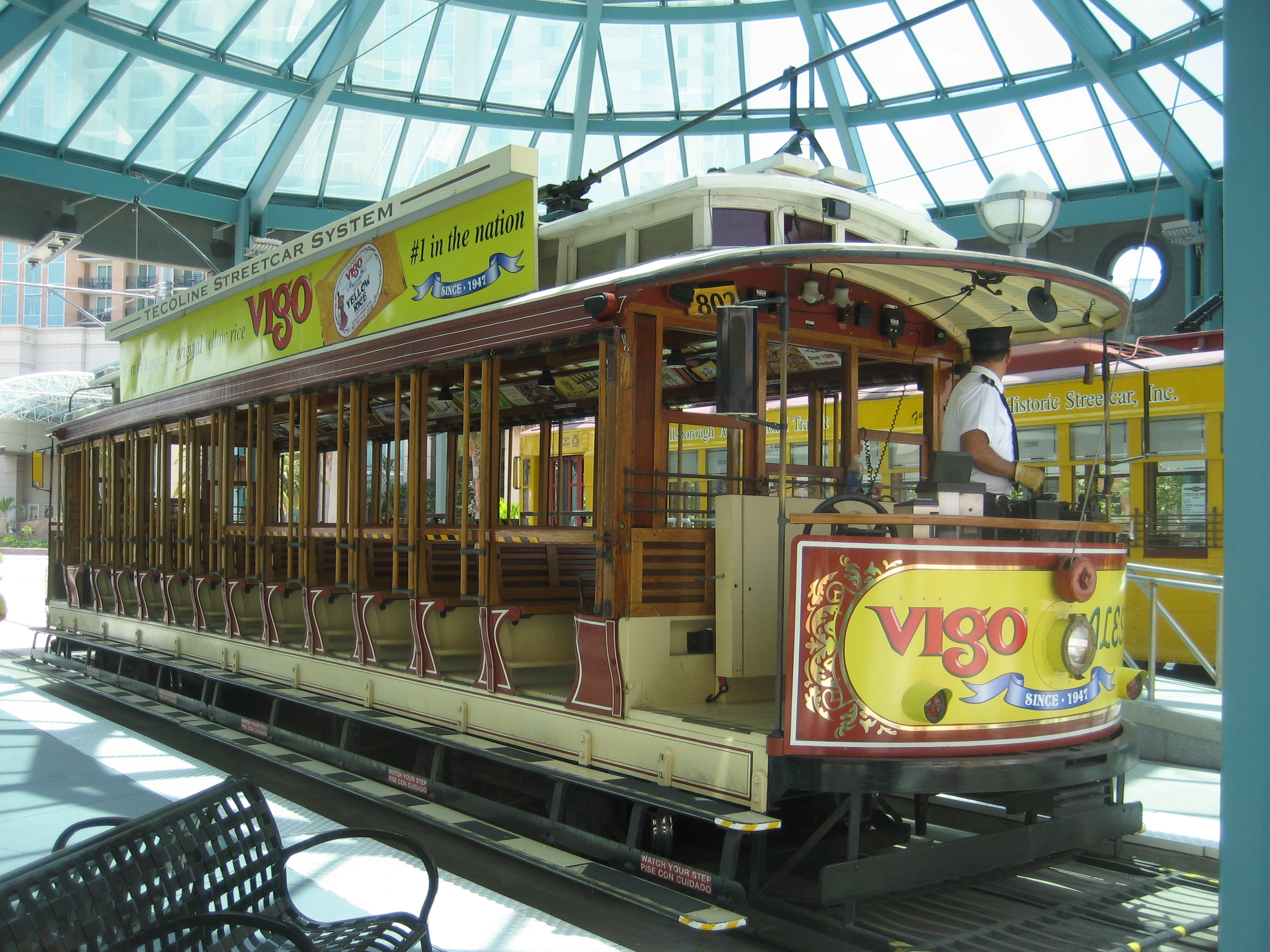
"Breezer" streetcar at Greco Plaza stop

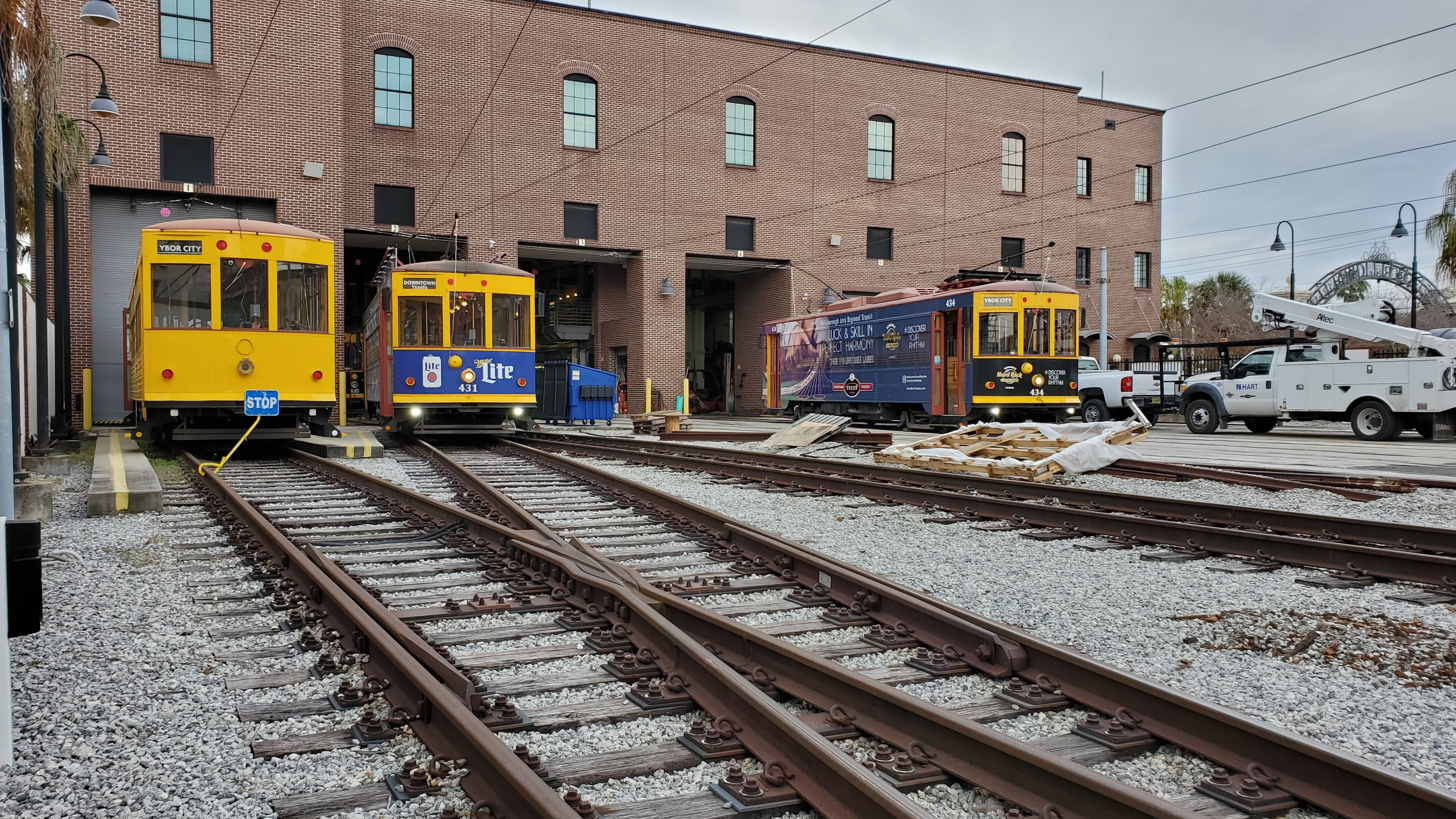
Streetcars in the maintenance facility

== See also ==
- Light rail in the United States
- List of heritage railroads in the United States
- List of streetcar systems in the United States
- Royal Palm Railway Experience
- Streetcars in North America
- Transportation in Florida
