= MetroRapid =

Bus service in Florida, United States

Overview
- Operator: HART

Route
- Start: Downtown Tampa
- End: UCF
- Length: 12.5 miles (20.1 km)
- Stops: 52

MetroRapid is an express bus system in Tampa, Florida, US. Operated by Hillsborough Area Regional Transit, it incorporates some bus rapid transit features. Currently, there is only one line in operation, the North-South line, with an East-West line in the planning phase. Subsequent lines could open depending on the success of the two initial lines.

== History and planning ==
HART began preliminary planning for a bus rapid transit (BRT) system in 2004, with studies launched in 2005. What is now known as the MetroRapid North-South Line was selected in 2005 to become the first leg of the system, after initial plans to have BRT run along interstate corridors deteriorated. The Nebraska Ave corridor is HART's busiest bus corridor. A second route connecting East Tampa to Tampa International Airport via Hillsborough Ave and MLK Blvd was also brought up. In August 2006, the Hillsborough County Board of Commissioners voted to invest $40 million into the BRT project. Further funding has been obtained since then for the North-South route. However, the East-West route remains largely unfunded.

=== Funding ===
Hillsborough County Community Investment Tax funded the design and construction phases of the MetroRapid North-South project. A June 2012 review of the original project estimate of $31 million determined that the project was under budget by $5.7 million. This funding has been reallocated back to Hillsborough County for its infrastructure needs, if desired. CIT funding is only earmarked for capital improvement costs, and cannot be reallocated for operational costs, such as bus routes.

== North-South Line ==
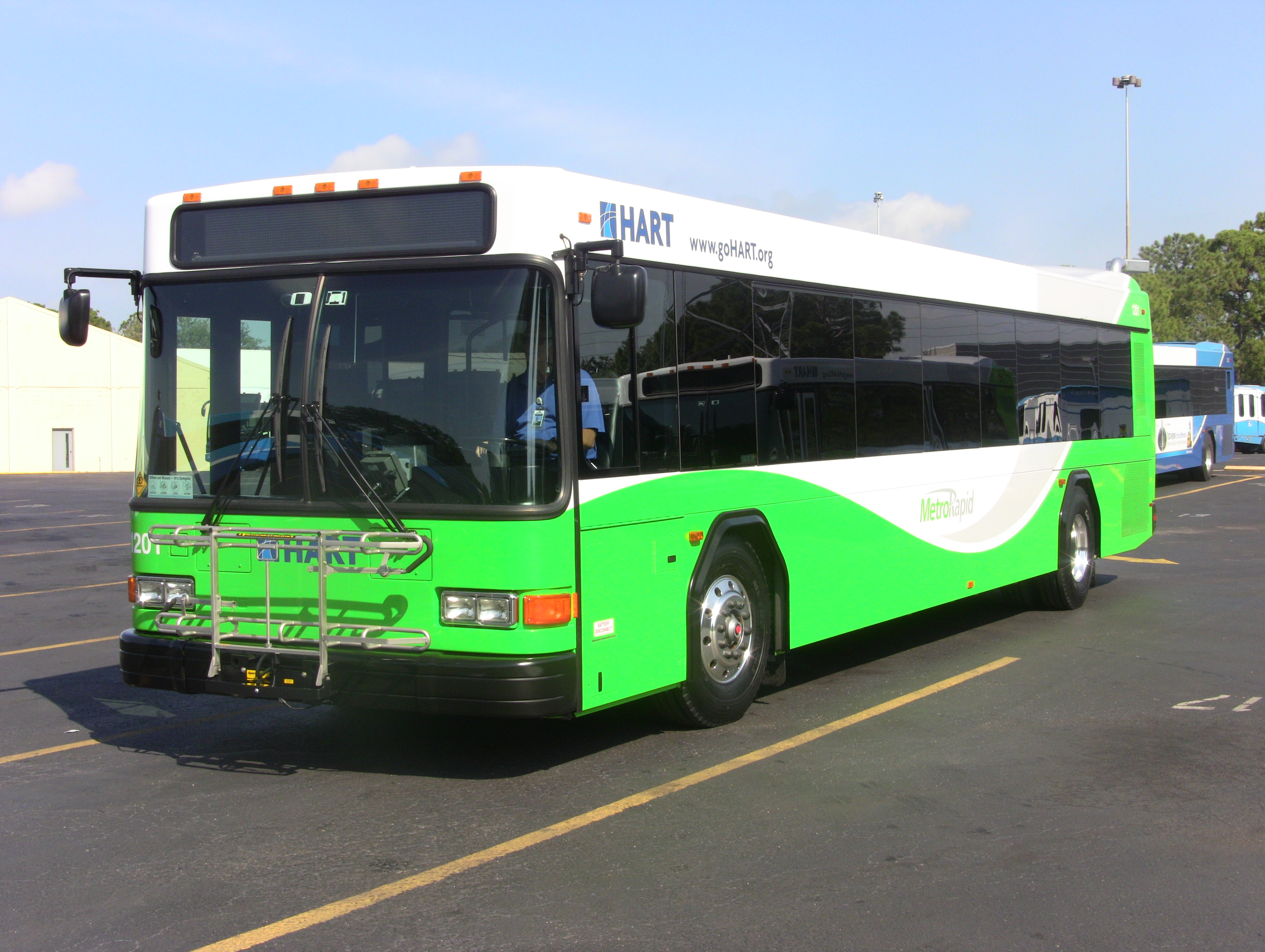
MetroRapid bus

The MetroRapid North-South Line consists of an approximately 12.5 mile route along Fletcher Avenue and Nebraska Avenue, from Downtown Tampa to USF Area, with 52 stations along the line. It uses 12 low-floor buses, and transit signal priority in order to shorten red lights and lengthen green lights to make transit faster along the line. At major stations, there are ticket vending machines, in order to speed up the boarding process.

Construction of the North-South line began on August 6, 2012 and was largely completed by March, 2013. A two-week soft opening phase took place between May 28, 2013 and June 7, 2013, by which customers could use MetroRapid for free. The line officially began revenue service on June 10, 2013.

Since October 8, 2017, HART established more stops to the Downtown-USF Line, replacing Route 2. The segment to USF to Hidden River Complix is run Weekdays for Route 33.

=== Operating schedule ===
(As of 7 October 2018)

- Weekday, 15-minute service from Marion Transit Center (MTC) to University Area Transit Center (UATC)
- Saturday/Sunday, 30-minute service from Marion Transit Center (MTC) to University Area Transit Center (UATC)

== Future ==
HART is planning a second line, called the East-West Line. This line is largely unfunded, and HART is seeking federal funding to assist with this portion of the project. Subsequent lines are planned for the Dale Mabry Highway corridor from Lutz to MacDill Air Force Base, New Tampa via Bruce B. Downs Blvd, and the Selmon Expressway corridor between Downtown Tampa and Brandon. These subsequent lines will be dependent on the success of the two initial lines.

Route name	Starting point	Major transfer points	Terminus	Operation and frequency	Direction	Projected start of service	Notes
North-South Line	Marion Transit Center - Downtown Tampa	Nebraska Ave/Dr. MLK Jr. Blvd Connecting Rt. 32, Nebraska/Busch Blvd Connecting Rt. 39, Union Station Tampa - Amtrak, County Center, University Community Resource Center via Nebraska/Fletcher Ave.	University Area Transit Center - USF Area	Every 15 Minutes between MTC & UATC Weekdays & 30 Minutes Weekends	Bi-Direction - North/South	Opened May 28, 2013. Revenue service began June 10, 2013.	Service updated since October 7, 2018. Currently the only MetroRapid route in service.
East-West Line	Tampa International Airport	NetPark Transfer Center - East Tampa	Temple Terrace City Hall - Temple Terrace	Unknown	Peak Direction - East/West	Unknown	Was planned of being a second MetroRapid Route for HART's bus rapid transit program. So far, it is largely unfunded at this time.
Brandon Line	Dover Rd. Park-n-Ride - Brandon	via Selmon Expressway	Marion Transit Center - Downtown Tampa	Unknown	Peak Direction - East/West	Unknown	Previously used for Route 22X before October 8, 2017
New Tampa Line	New Tampa	via Bruce B Downs Blvd	University Area Transit Center - USF Area	Unknown	Peak Direction - North/South	Unknown	UATC to Wiregrass portion is currently used for Route 275LX
Dale Mabry Hwy Corridor	Lutz Target - Lutz	via Dale Mabry Highway	MacDill AFB - South Tampa	Unknown	Peak Direction - North/South	Unknown	Majority of Dale Mabry Highway is currently used for Route 36. HART's Route 20X currently serves Lutz Target, Pasco in peak direction to and from Downtown Tampa and MacDill Air Force Base.
Kennedy Boulevard/TIA Line	Marion Transit Center - Downtown Tampa	via Kennedy Boulevard	Tampa International Airport	Unknown	Peak direction - East/West	Unknown	Currently used for Route 30
Busch Boulevard/Gunn Highway Line	NetPark Transfer Center - East Tampa	via Busch Blvd/Gunn Hwy	Northwest Transfer Center - Town N' Country	Unknown	Peak direction - East/West	Unknown	Currently used for Route 39

Some information regarding proposed MetroRapid routes came from this link

== East-West Line ==
MetroRapid East-West will connect Tampa International Airport, the Westshore Business District and the HART Netpark bus transfer center at Hillsborough Avenue and 56th Street, with connections to the North-South line at Martin Luther King Jr. Boulevard.

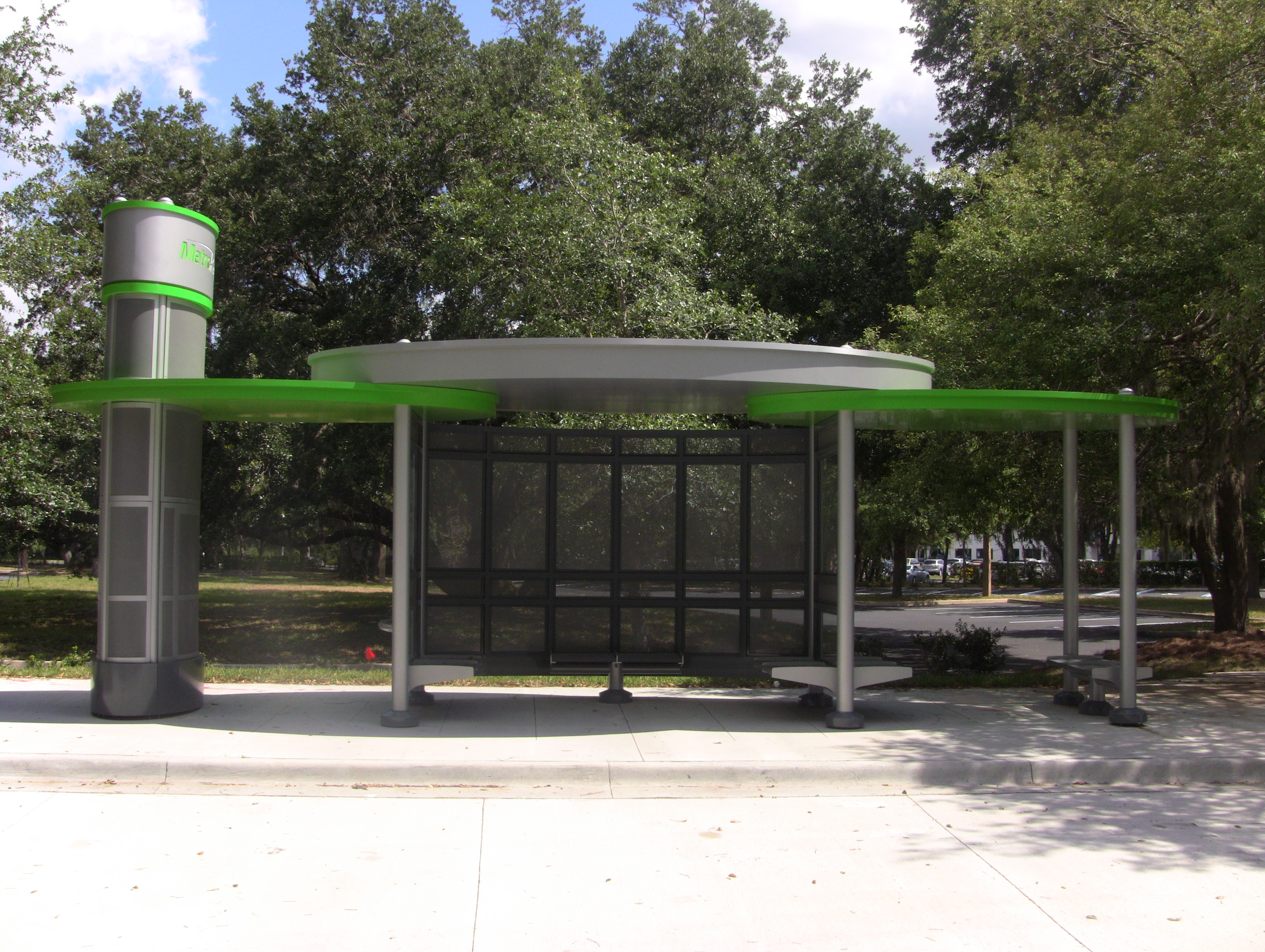
MetroRapid North-South Station C featuring modern design, Ticket Vending Machine, bike rack and solar lighting.

The bus that is used for MetroRapid.
