= Centennial Park station =

Centennial Park
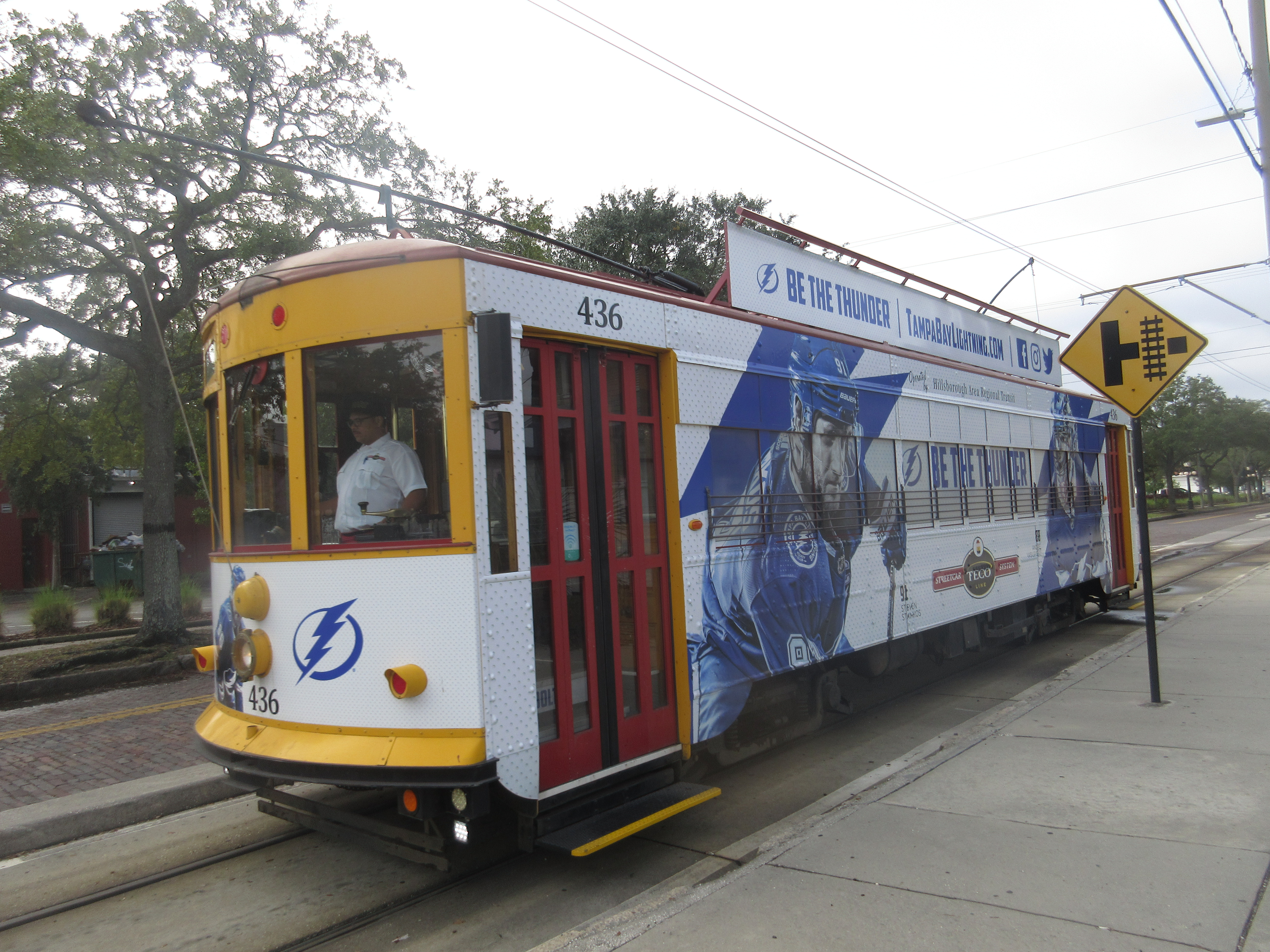

General information
- Location: 8th Avenue and 20th Street; Tampa, FL
- Coordinates: 27°57′39.7″N 82°26′14″W
- Owner: HARTline
- Platforms: 1 side platform
- Tracks: 1

Construction
- Structure type: at-grade
- Parking: yes
- Accessible: yes

History
- Opened: October 20, 2002

Services
Preceding station	HART	Following station
Centro Ybor toward Whiting	TECO Line	Terminus
Location

Centennial Park (signed as Ybor City - Centennial Park) is a TECO Line streetcar station in Tampa, Florida. The station has one track and one side platform on the north side of 8th Avenue. It is the first station on the streetcar and was the location of the opening ceremony of the first train. There is parking for the station just north.

== Within walking distance ==
- Centennial Park
- Ybor City State Museum
- Columbia Restaurant

== See also ==
- Light rail in the United States
- List of streetcar systems in the United States
- Streetcars in North America
- Transportation in Florida
