= Hattricks station =

Hattricks
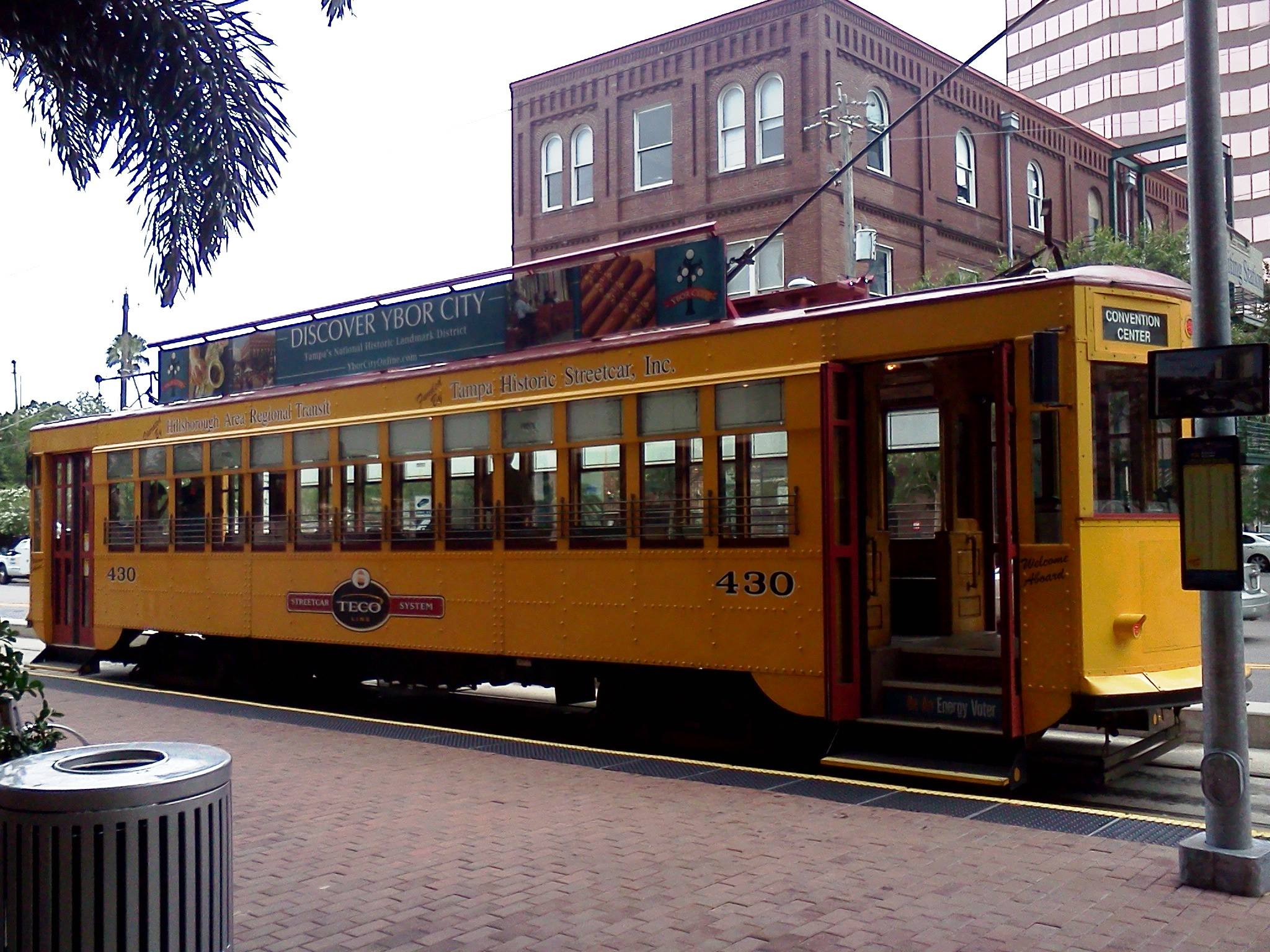
- A streetcar at the stop in 2013

General information
- Location: Franklin Street and Whiting Street; Tampa, FL
- Coordinates: 27°56′41.7″N 82°27′23.9″W
- Owner: HARTline
- Platforms: 1 side platform
- Tracks: 1

Construction
- Structure type: at-grade
- Parking: yes
- Accessible: yes

History
- Opened: 2010
- Former names: Whiting

Services
Preceding station	HART	Following station
Terminus	TECO Line	Dick Greco Plaza toward Centennial Park
Location

Hattricks (signed as Downtown Tampa/Whiting Street) is a TECO Line station located in Tampa, Florida. It is located at Franklin Street and Whiting Street.
