= Transportation in Florida =

Transportation in Florida includes a variety of options, including Interstate Highways, U.S. Highways, and Florida State Roads; Amtrak and commuter rail services; airports, public transportation, and sea ports, in a number of the state's counties and regions.

== Highways ==
Florida's interstates, U.S. Highways, and state highways are maintained by the Florida Department of Transportation, with the exception of a few highways in Miami, which are maintained by the Miami-Dade Expressway Authority (MDX).

Florida's interstate highway system contains 1,473 miles (2,371 km) of highway, and there are 9,934 miles (15,987 km) of non-interstate highway in the state, such as Florida state highways and U.S. Highways.

State highways are numbered according to convention. The first digits of state highways with some exceptions (such as State Road 112 (SR 112) connecting Interstate 95 (I-95) to the Miami International Airport) are numbered with the first digit indicating what area of the state the road is in, from 1 in the north and east to 9 in the south and west. Major north-south state roads generally have one- or two-digit odd route numbers that increase from east to west, while major east-west state roads generally have one- or two-digit even route numbers that increase from north to south. Roads of secondary importance usually have three-digit route numbers. The first digit x of their route number is the same as the first digit of the road with two-digit number x0 to the immediate north. The three-digit route numbers also increase from north to south for even numbers and east to west for odd numbers.

Following this convention, SR 907, or Alton Road on Miami Beach, is farther east than SR 997, which is Krome Avenue, or the farthest west north-south road in Miami–Dade County. One notable exception to the convention is SR 826, or the Palmetto Expressway (pictured at the right heading north) which, although even numbered, is signed north-south. State roads can have anywhere from one to four digits depending on the importance and location of the road. County roads often follow this same system.

A law introduced on January 1, 2013, required all non US drivers to possess an International Driving License to drive within the state. The Florida Department for Highway Safety and Motor Vehicles issued a statement on February 14, 2013, announcing that the law would not be enforced.

== Railways ==
=== Inter-city rail ===
Amtrak service exists in Florida. Sanford, in Greater Orlando, is the southern terminus of the Amtrak Auto Train, which originates at Lorton, Virginia, south of Washington, DC. Florida is also served by two additional Amtrak trains (the Floridian and the Silver Meteor), which operate between Chicago and Miami and New York City and Miami, respectively. In 2023, Amtrak had a total of 951,043 boardings and alightings in the state of Florida.

Orlando was the former eastern terminus of Amtrak's Sunset Limited, which traveled across the southern United States via New Orleans, Houston, and San Antonio to its western terminus of Los Angeles. The service originally extended further south to Miami from 1993 to 1996. Service was cut back to Sanford in November 1996 as part of systemwide cuts, but was later re-extended to Orlando in October 1997. However, since 2005, service to Florida has been suspended indefinitely in the aftermath of Hurricane Katrina.

Brightline is a higher-speed service between Miami and Orlando. There are plans for Brightline to reach Tampa in the future.

==== High-speed inter-city rail ====
The Florida Department of Transportation was preparing to build a high-speed rail lie between Tampa, Lakeland, and Orlando. This would have been the first phase of the Florida High Speed Rail system. Soil work began in July 2010 with the federal government expecting full construction to begin in 2011. However, Governor Rick Scott declined the federal funding.

Florida voters approved a state constitutional amendment in 2000 for the construction of a high-speed rail network. Due to public skepticism about the multibillion-dollar price, voters repealed this amendment. The first segment of this network, projected to have opened in 2009, would have connected Tampa and Orlando, in hopes of alleviating traffic on the busy Interstate 4 corridor. Later segments would have connected Miami, Fort Myers, Jacksonville, Tallahassee, and Pensacola.

== Airports ==
Florida has 131 public airports. Florida's seven large hub and medium hub airports, as classified by the FAA, are the following:

Florida large and medium hub airports
City served	Code	Airport name	FAA Category	Enplanements
Miami	MIA	Miami International Airport	Large Hub	17,017,654
Orlando	MCO	Orlando International Airport	Large Hub	17,017,491
Fort Lauderdale	FLL	Fort Lauderdale–Hollywood Int'l Airport	Large Hub	10,829,810
Tampa	TPA	Tampa International Airport	Large Hub	8,137,222
Fort Myers	RSW	Southwest Florida International Airport	Medium Hub	3,714,157
West Palm Beach	PBI	Palm Beach International Airport	Medium Hub	2,958,416
Jacksonville	JAX	Jacksonville International Airport	Medium Hub	2,755,719

Major international airports in Florida which processed more than 15 million passengers each in 2005 are Orlando International Airport (34,128,048 est. 2006), Miami International Airport (32,533,974 est. 2006), Fort Lauderdale-Hollywood International Airport(22,390,285 est. 2006) and Tampa International Airport (19,045,390 est. 2006).

Secondary airports, with annual passenger traffic exceeding 5 million each in 2005, include Southwest Florida International Airport (Fort Myers) (7,518,169 est. 2006), Palm Beach International Airport (West Palm Beach) (7,014,237 est. 2006), Jacksonville International Airport (5,741,652).

Regional airports which processed over one million passengers each in 2005 are Pensacola (1,638,605), Sarasota-Bradenton (1,337,571), and Tallahassee (1,129,947) and Sanford (1,649,237) which is primarily served by international charter airlines.

Other smaller, regional airports with commercial service (with passengers served in 2005, where available) include those at Daytona Beach (615,841), Fort Walton Beach (520,000), Gainesville (345,788), Key West, Marathon Key, Melbourne (466,367), Naples, Panama City (382,551), and St. Petersburg-Clearwater (596,510).

== Canals ==
Florida is part of the Intracoastal Waterway, a 3,000-mile (4,800 km) inland waterway. Florida has the Okeechobee Waterway, St. Lucie Canal (C-44), Miami Canal, and Tamiami Canal.

== Public transportation ==
Miami's public transportation is served by Miami-Dade Transit, which runs Metrorail, a heavy rail rapid transit system; Metromover, a people mover train system in Downtown Miami; and Metrobus, Miami-Dade's bus system. Metrorail runs throughout Miami-Dade County and has 23 stations on a 24.4-mile (39.3 km) track connecting to Downtown Miami's Metromover and Tri-Rail. Metromover has three lines and 21 stations on a 4.4-mile (7.1 km) track connecting Uptown and the Brickell Financial District inside of Downtown Miami. Outside of Miami-Dade County, public transit in the South Florida metropolitan area is served by Broward County Transit and Palm Tran; commuter rail service is provided by Tri-Rail, with 19 stations including the region's three international airports.

Tampa and its surrounding area is served by buses run by Hillsborough Area Regional Transit, or HART for short. In addition, HART runs continuous trolley services in downtown Tampa in the form of the TECO Line Streetcar, a heritage streetcar line sponsored by Tampa Electric Company. Pinellas County and St. Petersburg provide similar services through the Pinellas Suncoast Transit Authority, or PSTA for short. The beaches of Pinellas County have their own bus system run by PSTA called the Suncoast Beach Trolley. Downtown St. Petersburg also has a separate bus system, known as The Looper. The Cross-Bay Ferry has connected Tampa's Channelside District to Downtown St. Petersburg since 2016.

Greater Orlando utilizes the Lynx bus system, which also operates a free bus rapid transit service in downtown Orlando called LYMMO. A commuter rail service – SunRail – also serves the Metro Orlando area. The Walt Disney World Resort is also located in this area and is served by Disney Transport, its own internal transportation system consisting of buses, watercraft, parking lot trams, and the Walt Disney World Monorail System. The latter is one of the busiest mass transit rail systems in North America, with over 150,000 riders served each day.

Public transportation in Jacksonville is provided by Jacksonville Transportation Authority (JTA), operating bus service, trolleys, paratransit, and a people mover. The people mover, known as the JTA Skyway is located in downtown Jacksonville, and operates 8 stations along a 2.5 miles (4.0 km) track. Bus service as well as paratransit service is provided around Duval County and partially in Clay County. JTA operates three trolley lines in three different neighborhoods: Downtown, Riverside, and Jacksonville Beach. The entire JTA system has a daily ridership of over 42,000.

In Volusia County, VoTran provides bus transportation throughout the entire county. Express service to Orlando was provided between 1998 and 2014 and has since been replaced by SunRail.

In Polk County, the Citrus Connection and Winter Haven Area Transit (WHAT) provide regional transportation in the cities of Lakeland, Bartow, Winter Haven, Auburndale and smaller surrounding municipalities and unincorporated areas. WHAT connects with the Lynx system at Haines City.

The Gainesville metropolitan area is served by the fourth largest public transit system in the state of Florida. Gainesville Regional Transit System or RTS presently serves 40 city routes (19 on Saturdays, 16 on Sundays), 10 campus routes, and five "Later Gator" routes. Paratransit (ADA) service is also provided to anyone with a Gainesville address. RTS has a daily ridership of approximately 25,000 riders.

In Indian River County, a public bus transportation system called GoLine, which has 14 routes and 543 stops, operates across the county.

On April 1, 2016, Florida governor Rick Scott signed a video surveillance bill that was to be used in public transit systems throughout the state. Public transit systems may release their video surveillance to local, state or federal agencies in furtherance of civic duty and responsibility, and they may release video footage upon showing good cause to a court of competent jurisdiction.

=== Intercity Bus ===
Bus service between cities and towns in Florida is provided by a number of private companies. Amtrak Thruway service is offered connecting Amtrak trains to cities off of train routes, including Fort Myers and St. Augustine, but tickets cannot be purchased for the bus alone, only a combined bus-rail itinerary.

== List of Florida roads ==
=== Interstates ===
Road name	South or west terminus	North or east terminus	Notes
I-4	Tampa	Daytona Beach	Has junctions with I-75 in Tampa and I-95 in Daytona Beach.
I-10	Alabama state line, near Pensacola	Jacksonville	Has junctions with I-75 near Lake City and I-95 in Jacksonville.
I-75	Hialeah/Miami Lakes	Georgia state line, near Lake City	Has junctions with I-10 in Lake City and I-4 in Tampa.
I-95	Downtown Miami	Georgia state line, near Jacksonville	Has junctions with I-10 in Jacksonville and I-4 in Daytona Beach.

==== Auxiliary Interstates ====
Road name	Notes
I-110	A spur from I-10 into downtown Pensacola.
I-175	Connects I-275 to southern downtown St. Petersburg.
I-195	An extension of Miami's Airport Expressway (SR 112); a spur eastward from I-95 to Miami Beach.
I-275	A 60 miles (97 km) westward half-loop from I-75 north of Ellenton, over the Sunshine Skyway Bridge, through St. Petersburg, to Tampa International Airport and downtown Tampa, reconnecting with I-75 in Tampa's northern suburbs.
I-295	A beltway around Jacksonville.
I-375	Connects I-275 to northern downtown St. Petersburg.
I-395	An extension of Miami's Dolphin Expressway (SR 836); a spur eastward from I-95 to Miami Beach.
I-595	Connects I-75, I-95, Fort Lauderdale-Hollywood International Airport, and Port Everglades.

=== Toll roads ===
Florida has several toll roads, totaling 515 miles (829 km) of the state highway system. Major toll roads include:

- I-75, as it passes through the Everglades between Naples and Fort Lauderdale has been grandfathered as a toll road from its original construction as State Road 84 (SR 84)
- Florida's Turnpike, which begins at US 1 in Florida City and continues north through the western suburbs of South Florida turning northwest at Fort Pierce and continuing through central Florida, passing west of Orlando and ending at I-75 near Wildwood, 23 miles (37 km) south of Ocala. Florida's Turnpike has the distinction of having the farthest distance between two exits of any limited-access highway in the United States. It is more than 47 miles (76 km) between exits 193 and 240; there is a service area with fuel at milepost 229.
- I-275 Sunshine Skyway Bridge, which connects Pinellas County with Manatee County

=== U.S. Routes ===
- US 1
  - US 301
- US 17
- US 19
  - US 319
  - US 221
- US 23
- US 27
- US 29
  - US 129
  - US 231
  - US 331
- US 41
  - US 441
- US 90
- US 92
  - US 192
- US 98

== Funding ==
Federal, state and local governments pay for road construction and maintenance. In 2015, the federal government approved $12 billion over the next five years. $10 billion will be used for the highway program. $2 billion will be used for mass transit systems.

== See also ==
- Florida
- Florida Department of Transportation
- Plug-in electric vehicles in Florida
- Transportation in South Florida
