= Hillsborough Area Regional Transit =

Transit agency in Hillsborough County, Florida, United States

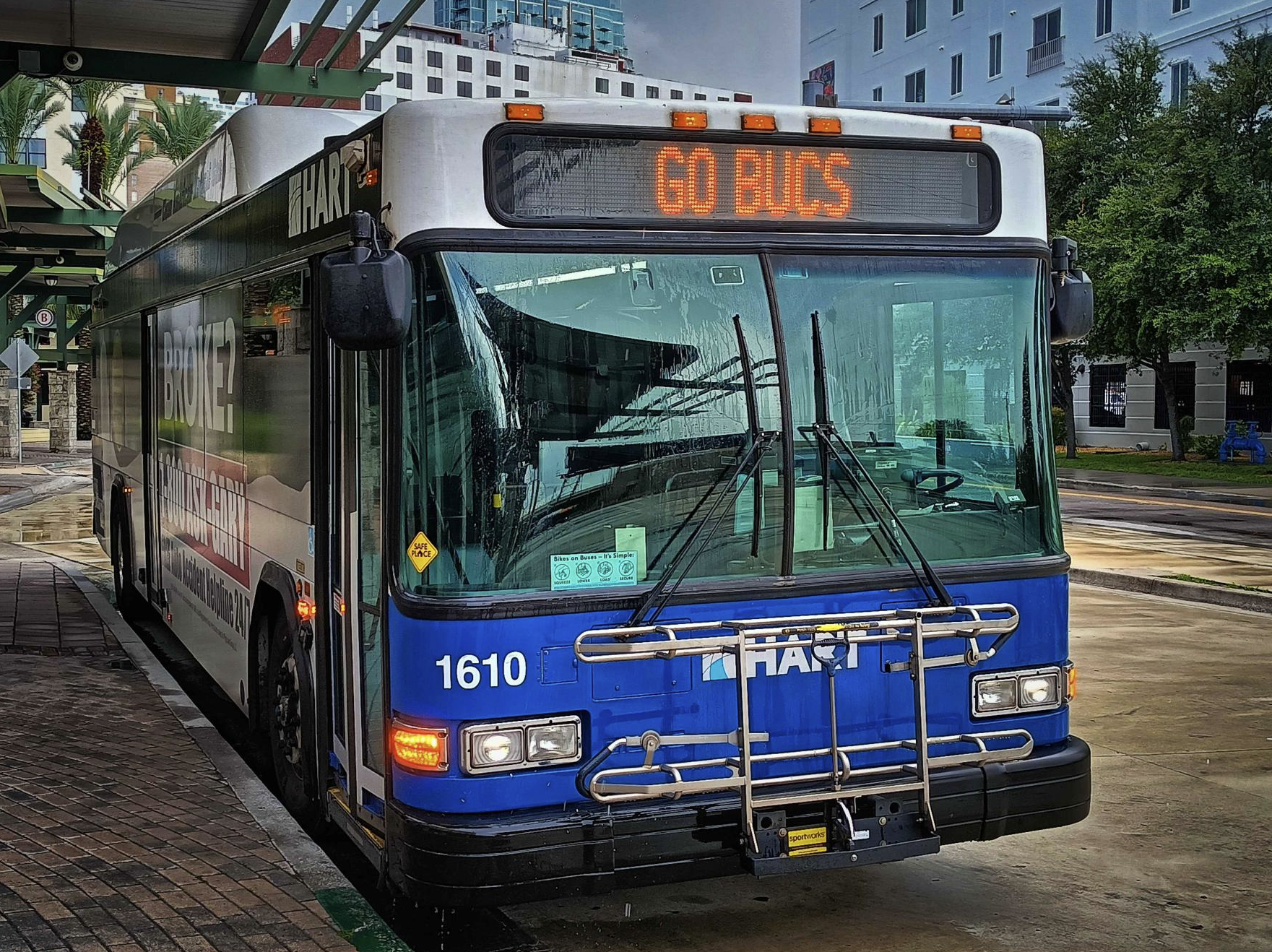
- Parent: Hillsborough Area Regional Transit Authority
- Founded: 1980
- Headquarters: 1201 E. 7th Avenue; Tampa, Florida
- Service area: Hillsborough County, Florida
- Service type: Bus, streetcar, paratransit
- Routes: 26 local, 7 express, 1 Streetcar, 5 flex, MetroRapid
- Fleet: 169 buses
- Daily ridership: 35,000 (weekdays, Q2 2026)
- Annual ridership: 11,937,500 (2025)
- Fuel type: Diesel, CNG
- Chief executive: Scott Drainville
- Website: gohart.org

Hillsborough Area Regional Transit (HART), also known as the Hillsborough Transit Authority, is the public transportation provider for Hillsborough County, Florida. The agency is based in Tampa and operates fixed-route local and express bus service, paratransit service, and demand-response service. HART also manages the TECO Line Streetcar and MetroRapid, an express bus system with some bus rapid transit features. In 2025, the system had a ridership of 11,937,500.

== History ==
A property tax to fund a transit system was approved by voters in Hillsborough County on November 1980 after an earlier attempt in June had failed amid low voter turnout. The existing Hillsborough Transit Authority was renamed to the Hillsborough Area Regional Transit (HART) as part of a plan to acquire new buses and expand service using the new property tax revenue.

=== Budget cuts and system reorganization (2007–2011) ===
Like many local agencies throughout Florida, HART was forced in 2007 to cut its budget by $1.7 million. As a result of this, HARTflex service was canceled and numerous routes saw drawbacks in service. Limited Express Route 52 and Trolley Route 98 were eliminated due to low ridership.

During the 2009/2010 fiscal year, HART slashed another $3 million from its budget in order to compensate for additional property tax revenue losses. This move was achieved by trimming service in Town-N-Country and North Tampa, as well as cutting underutilized trips on numerous routes. To counteract plummeting property tax revenues, HART proposed to switch to a sales tax-based system which many other transit agencies in Florida already use. Hillsborough County attempted to pass such a measure during the 2010 election season, but it failed by a 58/42% margin.

Despite drawbacks caused by state and county mandated budget cuts and the global recession, the agency was attempting to improve transit service by managing existing service while cutting under-performing service and gradually raising fares. HART's 2008 Community Report outlined several key changes, such as the introduction of HARTflex service—a demand responsive transit system—and the MetroRapid bus rapid transit system.

Since 2010, a majority of HART's routes have had their paths changed. These changes included moving or eliminating inefficient segments and adding services to better serve riders in the long term. Several under-performing routes, such as Neighborhood Connector routes 87, 88, and 89, were eliminated in favor of neighboring transit routes, HARTflex service, or—in the case of Route 59LX—by improved services (Route 61LX). HART also began testing a limited stop route, Route 6LTD, to replace Route 23X.

With many fiscal impacts looming to negatively impact HART's future plans and budgeting, including, but not limited to: , and the national trend of declining transit ridership, In 2017, HART conducted an analysis of the entire system to reduce operating costs, preparing for possible reductions in property tax revenues and federal transit funding support. Public outreach began during the spring of 2017 and continued through that summer, eventually leading up to the announcement of a system-wide restructuring effort called Mission MAX, which will attempt to modernize the system to operate a more grid-like system, shorten travel times, and provide more direct service to popular destinations.

== Services ==
HART operates 26 local bus and 7 express bus routes. In addition, the agency operates the TECO Line Streetcar, and the MetroRapid BRT line.

HART provides the HART Flex Service consisting of commuter vans that have routes in designated areas. Walk-up service is provided at regular HART stops along the Flex service route. Alternatively, riders can reserve a pick-up or drop-off at a location not at a HART stop by calling to reserve between 2 and 72 hours in advance. Walk-up service may be limited by the number of reservations. The service areas are typically 2.5 miles from a preset route. Several zones were established in 2017, but replaced by conventional buses in 2021.

In 2006, HART introduced late-night bus service on nine local bus routes in order to meet the diverse needs of its riders. Some of these routes now run as late as 12 am as a result in the increase of service. Since 2007, the number of routes running weekday services beyond 8:00pm has increased to 16 routes.

=== Commuter Express ===
In 2004, HART revised its express bus route system. The changes included new routes to Brandon and Pasco County, changes to existing routes (such as Route 28X), and the addition of 12 new Gillig BRT buses to the existing HART bus fleet. Most commuter express routes were connected to Downtown Tampa. Some express routes operate on a peak direction schedule during rush hour, while others operate on an all-day schedule.

=== MetroRapid ===
MetroRapid is HART's "light" bus rapid transit service, which began service on May 28, 2013. MetroRapid currently consists of one line, the north–south line (numbered as Route 400), which runs from Downtown Tampa to the University Area Transit Center via Nebraska and Fletcher Avenues daily, every 15 minutes.

=== TECO Line Streetcar ===
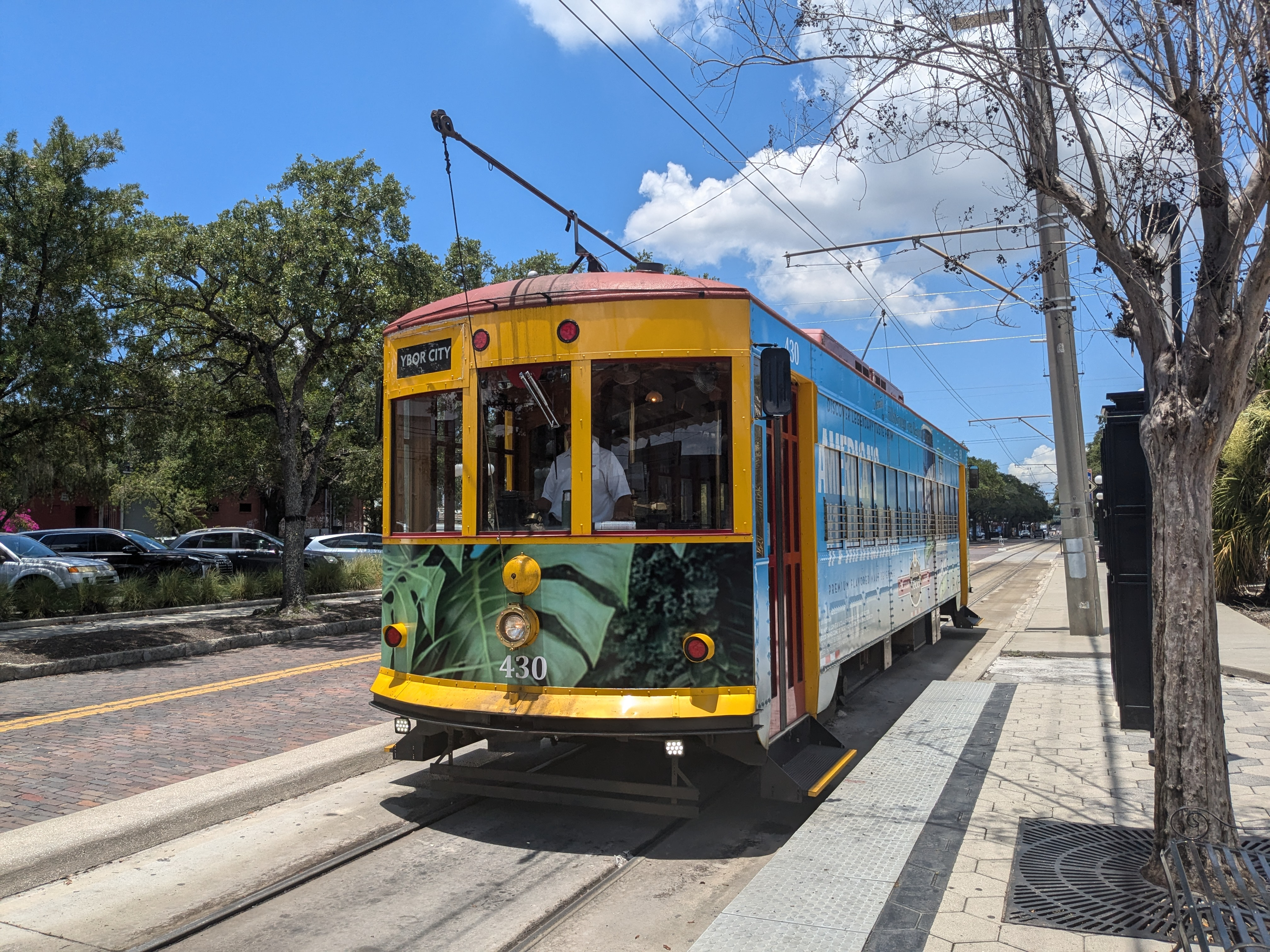
A TECO Line streetcar at Centennial Park station

The TECO Line is a 2.7-mile (4.3 km) streetcar line that runs along Downtown Tampa, through the Channel District, and Ybor City. The line opened in 2002 and features replicas of trolleys that operated on the original Tampa Streetcar Line, which closed in 1946.

== Fares ==
As of January 2025, a standard one-way adult fare on most HART services is $2.00, with fares being capped at $4.00 a day when using a Flamingo smart card or the Flamingo app. Paper tickets were phased out in December 2024. HART offers free or discounted fares for youth, students, seniors, Medicare users, and disabled people through the Flamingo app and partnerships.

== Facilities ==
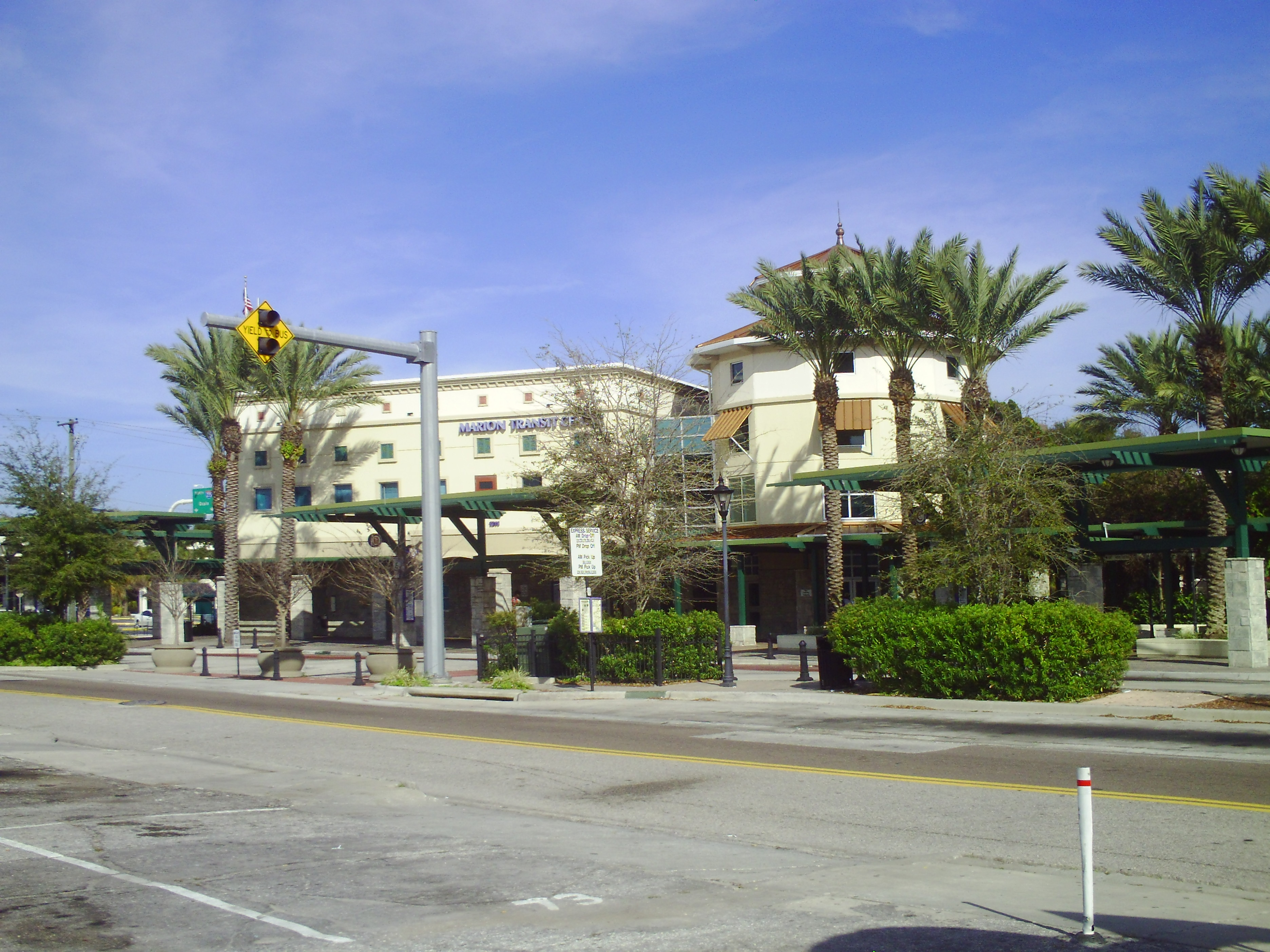
The Marion Transit Center in northern Downtown Tampa is HART's main hub.

Like many transit agencies, HART has operated its bus system similar to a hub and spoke model. However, with system redesigns taking place in 2005 and 2017, the reliance on traditional hubs has lessened in favor of a grid-based system where transfers are done at key intersections and corridors.

The main hub for HART is the Marion Transit Center in Downtown Tampa, serving 16 local and express routes including Pinellas Suncoast Transit Authority (PSTA) as well as FlixBus and Greyhound intercity buses. The center was constructed in 2001, replacing the obsolete Northern Terminal, which sat underneath the I-275 viaduct. The Marion Transit Center is located at the northern end of the Marion Street Transitway and includes a customer service center, office space, bus driver lounge, restrooms, bus shelters, and an array of public art displays.

Other major bus terminals include:

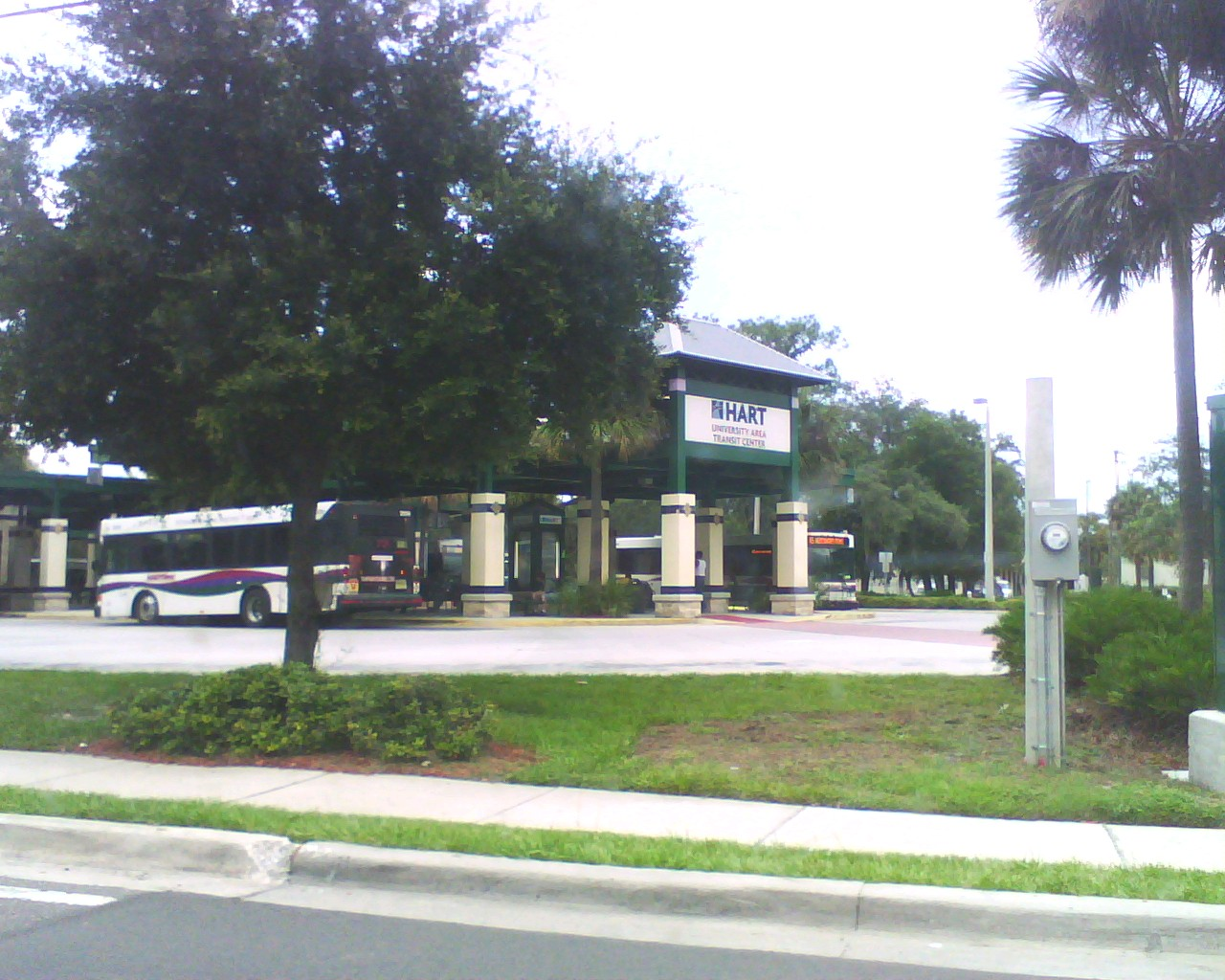
The University Area Transit Center west of the USF Medical Center.

- University Area Transit Center: Constructed in the late 1990s and located near the University of South Florida, the UATC is the transfer point for 10 local bus routes. The facility includes basic facilities and a customer service center. Prior to the UATC's construction, HART spent several years considering other locations as a transfer point in the university area, including University Mall. However, the University Mall plan failed to materialize due to financial problems and community opposition.
- NetPark Transfer Center: Located in east Tampa (off 56th Street and Hillsborough Ave), this facility is a transfer point for 8 local routes and includes restrooms, phones, and vending machines and will serve as a stop for HART's MetroRapid system.
- Northwest Transfer Center: Located on the corner of Sheldon Road and Waters Ave, the Northwest Transfer Center replaced a makeshift bus depot at Hanley/Waters Plaza. Construction began in the spring of 2007 and was opened to riders on July 29, 2008. The facility serves four local bus routes.
- Tampa International Airport Rental Car Facility Bus Hub: Located on the grounds of Tampa International Airport, adjacent to the Rental Car Facility. Riders can connect to the airport terminal via SkyConnect.

== Plans ==
=== West Shore Multi-Modal Center ===
HART and the Hillsborough County Aviation Authority have been discussing plans to build a transfer center at Tampa International Airport since 2008. Originally, the facility was to be located at the corner of O'Brien and Spruce streets but was dropped in 2011 in favor of a site closer to the TPA terminal. Plans for any transfer center on TPA property were deemed unviable in 2012 following global economic downturn and the consolidation of the airline industry on TPA's broad terminal expansion plans. In March, 2013, plans were unveiled for a possible Multi-Modal center along Interstate 275 in the WestShore Business District that could cater to multiple bus connections, light rail or commuter rail lines, and a People Mover system connecting the airport. This plan is heavily dependent on whether public transit in both Hillsborough and Pinellas counties are able to further expand. This in-turn, would be dependent on future funding situations. As of 2020, the multi-modal center remains a part of the Florida Department of Transportation's Tampa Bay NEXT interstate-based transportation plan.

=== TRANSitFORMATION ===
In September 2019, HART has several plans for the future of transportation in Hillsborough County under the hashtag #TRANSitFORMATION. Some of these plans include improvements and added services on select routes, more detailed information and improvements in bus shelters, adding electric bus pilots to their fleet and replacing select gas/diesel fuel buses, adding more Bus Rapid Transit (BRT) routes along Florida Ave, Nebraska Ave and Fowler Ave. also, HART has planned future commuter passenger rail or high speed rail transport across Hillsborough and its neighboring counties among the CSX rail corridor and possible future extensions for the TECO Streetcar Line.

== Fleet ==
As of October 2023, most local/express HART buses follow a blue and white livery. Trolley buses are in a similar pale blue/white livery, and MetroRapid buses are in a green/gray/white livery. Since a safety incident in 2019, buses have tempered glass protection doors to protect drivers from future attacks.

HART used a fleet of Gillig Phantom buses from 1996 to 2009, when they were replaced by 30 Gillig Low Floor buses that were purchased with federal stimulus funds. In November 2011, HART was awarded a $2.3 million federal grant to build a Compressed Natural Gas (CNG) fueling station at its operations facility, which was completed in 2013. In 2014, HART began purchasing CNG transit buses, along with a small fleet of CNG powered paratransit vans. As of 2020, there are 70 CNG powered buses in the fleet.

In 2020, the agency received a $2.7 million federal grant to purchase 4 electric buses. These buses were expected to be on the road by 2022, though it is unclear which manufacturer will be selected to produce them.

== See also ==
- List of bus transit systems in the United States
