= Light rail in the United States =

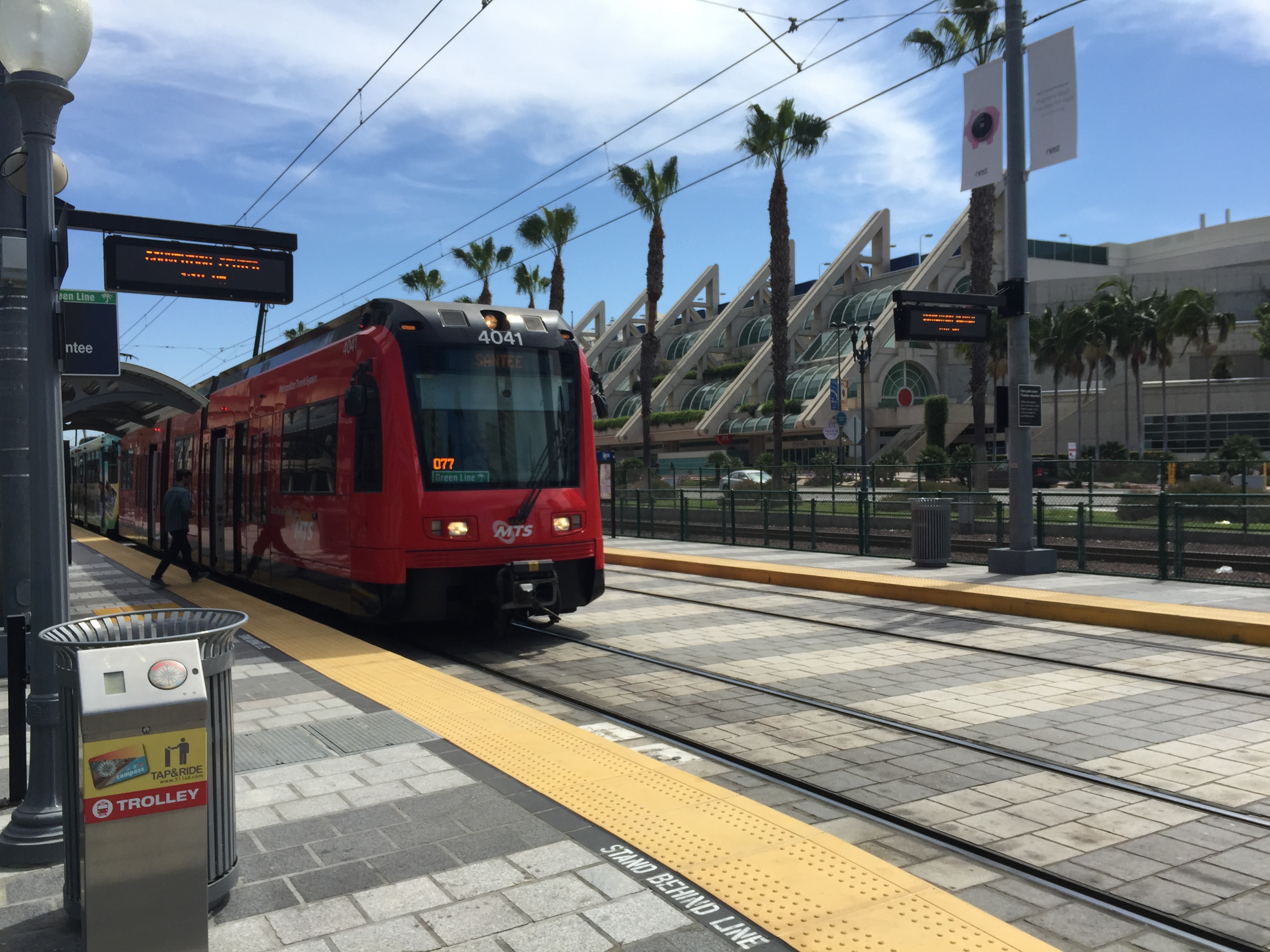
The San Diego Trolley, the second most heavily used light rail system in the United States.

The United States has 30 light rail systems, as counted by the Light Rail Transit Association, not including streetcar systems. Seven of them (Boston, Los Angeles, Philadelphia, Portland, San Diego, San Francisco, and Seattle) achieve more than 30 million unlinked passenger transits per year.

Light-rail systems are typically designed to carry fewer passengers than heavy-rail systems like commuter rail or rapid transit (subway). They can operate in mixed traffic (street running) or on routes that are not entirely grade-separated.

They typically take one of four forms: "first-generation" legacy systems, "second-generation" modern light-rail systems, streetcars, and hybrid rail systems (light rail with some commuter-rail features). All use similar technologies, and some systems blur the lines between the different forms.

== History ==
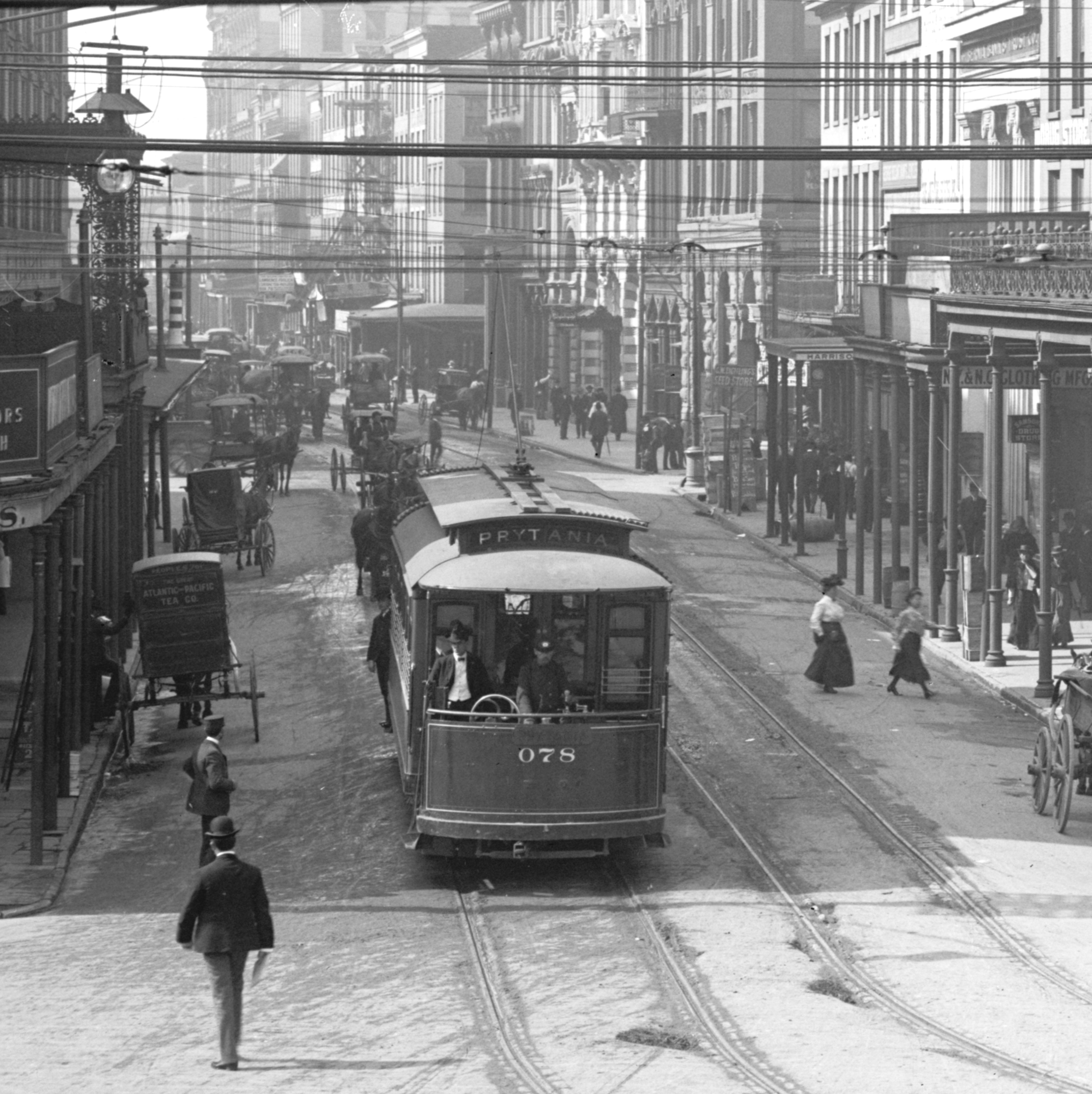
New Orleans streetcars, early 1900s

From the mid-19th century onwards, horse-drawn trams (or horsecars) were used in cities around the world. The St. Charles Avenue Line of the New Orleans streetcar system is the oldest continuously operating street railway system in the world, beginning operation as a horse-drawn system in 1835.

In the late 1880s, electrically powered street railways became technically feasible with the invention of a trolley pole system of collecting current. American inventor Frank J. Sprague installed the first successful electrified trolley system in Richmond, Virginia, in 1888. Before the invention of the internal combustion engine and the advent of motor-buses, they were the only practical means of public transport around cities.

The streetcar systems constructed in the 19th and early 20th centuries typically ran single-car setups. Some rail lines experimented with multiple-unit configurations, joining streetcars to make short trains, but this did not become common until later. When lines were built over longer distances (typically with a single track) before good roads were common, they were generally called interurban streetcars or radial railways in North America.

Historically, the rail gauge has had considerable variations, with a variety of gauges common in many early systems (e.g. the broad Pennsylvania trolley gauge, etc. used by New Orleans' streetcars and by the light rail systems in Philadelphia and Pittsburgh). However, most modern second-generation light rail systems now operate on standard gauge rail.

After World War II, six major cities in the United States (Boston, Newark, New Orleans, Philadelphia, Pittsburgh, San Francisco) continued to operate large first-generation streetcar systems, although most of them were later converted to modern light rail standards. Toronto in Canada marks the other city in North America with a continuing first-generation streetcar system. Additionally, a seventh American city, Cleveland, maintained an interurban system (e.g. the Blue and Green Lines) equivalent to what is now "light rail", that opened before World War I, and which is still in operation to this day.

When several of these cities upgraded to new technology (e.g. San Francisco, Newark, and Pittsburgh), they called it "light rail" to differentiate it from their existing streetcar systems since some continued to operate portions of both the old and new systems.

In the United States, most of the original first-generation streetcar systems were decommissioned from the 1950s onward through approximately 1970 as the usage of the automobile increased through government policy.

Although a few traditional streetcar or trolley systems still exist to this day the term "light rail" has come to mean a different type of rail system. Modern light rail technology has primarily German origins, since an attempt by Boeing Vertol to introduce a new American light rail vehicle was a technical failure. After World War II, the Germans retained their streetcar (Straßenbahn) networks and evolved them into model light rail systems (Stadtbahn).

The renaissance of light rail in the United States began in 1981, when the first truly second-generation light rail system was inaugurated in the United States, the San Diego Trolley in California, which adopted use of the German Siemens-Duewag U2 light rail vehicle. (This was just three years after the first North American second-generation light rail system opened in the Canadian city of Edmonton, Alberta in 1978, and which used the same German Siemens-Duewag U2 vehicles as San Diego). Other North American cities, particularly on the West Coast, began planning their own light rail systems in the 1980s.

As of March 2020, there are a total of 53 operational light rail-type lines and systems (noting that some cities, such as Philadelphia, Portland, San Francisco and Seattle, have more than one light rail system) that offer regular year-round transit service in the United States: 26 modern light rail systems, 14 modern streetcar systems, and 13 heritage streetcar systems (including the San Francisco cable car system).

== "First-generation" legacy systems ==
First-generation systems are typically remaining lines of sprawling streetcar systems decommissioned between the 1950s and about 1970. These lines were generally preserved because of their high ridership and some exclusive right of way. Many have been at least partly upgraded to more closely resemble the more modern second-generation light rail systems.

Location	Operator	System	Year originally opened	System length	Lines	Current type	Description
Boston	MBTA	Green Line	1857	26.7 mi (43.0 km)	4	Light rail	While changes were made to the original 1897 Tremont Street subway in 1962 and 2004, and to some of the line routes over the years, and the Green Line's streetcar A branch was closed in 1969, both systems have run intact with mostly uninterrupted service since their opening dates.
Boston	MBTA	Mattapan Line	1929	2.5 mi (4.0 km)	1	Light rail	While changes were made to the original 1897 Tremont Street subway in 1962 and 2004, and to some of the line routes over the years, and the Green Line's streetcar A branch was closed in 1969, both systems have run intact with mostly uninterrupted service since their opening dates.
Cleveland	GCRTA	Blue Line	1920	15.3 mi (24.6 km)	2	Light rail	Aside from line and station renovations in the early 1980s, and the Waterfront extension in 1996, these lines have operated essentially uninterrupted as light rail (interurbans) from their opening.
Cleveland	GCRTA	Green Line	1913	15.3 mi (24.6 km)	2	Light rail	Aside from line and station renovations in the early 1980s, and the Waterfront extension in 1996, these lines have operated essentially uninterrupted as light rail (interurbans) from their opening.
Newark	NJ Transit	Newark Light Rail	1862	6.2 mi (10.0 km)	2	Light rail	Outside of a switch to modern vehicles in 2001 and extensions in 2002 and 2006, this line still operates essentially unchanged since the 1930s.
New Orleans	NORTA	New Orleans Streetcars	1835	22.3 mi (35.9 km)	4	Heritage streetcar	The St. Charles Avenue Line is the oldest continuously operating street railway system in the world, beginning operation as a horse-drawn system in 1835; the line was electrified in 1893. Three additional lines built to more modern standards have been added since 1988.
Philadelphia	SEPTA	T	1859	19.8 mi (31.9 km)	5	Light rail/streetcar	The subway–surface trolley lines began operation as a mixed subway/streetcar system in 1906, and have continued operation essentially unchanged since that time.
Philadelphia	SEPTA	D	1906	11.9 mi (19.2 km)	2	Light rail/streetcar	SEPTA Routes 101 & 102 (the Media-Sharon Lines) began operation as rail lines in mostly exclusive rights-of-way (light rail) in 1906, and have also operated mostly unchanged since then.
Philadelphia	SEPTA	G	1859	8.4 mi (13.5 km)	1	Heritage streetcar	SEPTA Route 15 (the Girard Avenue Line) started as a horse car line, electrified in 1895. It was replaced with buses in 1992, but service on the line with heritage streetcars resumed in 2005.
Pittsburgh	PRT	Pittsburgh Light Rail	1859	26.2 mi (42.2 km)	2	Light rail	Began as a streetcar network, but was partially converted to light rail. By the 1970s, most routes were converted to bus, and the remaining streetcar lines (all of which still used the 1904 Mt. Washington Transit Tunnel) were converted to light rail. This included the construction of a new 1.1 miles (1.8 km) downtown tunnel. The converted system partially opened for service in 1984.
San Francisco	Muni	Cable cars	1878	5.2 mi (8.4 km)	3	Heritage cable car	World's last manually operated cable car system. Of the 23 lines established between 1873 and 1890, only three remain. While the cable cars are used to a certain extent by commuters, the vast majority of their seven million annual passengers are tourists.
San Francisco	Muni	Muni Metro	1860	35.7 mi (57.5 km)	7	Light rail/streetcar	Began as a streetcar network, but was partially converted to light rail. While most of San Francisco's original streetcar lines had been converted to buses, five lines with dedicated rights-of-way could not be converted. The streetcars were partially converted to light rail in 1980, sending the lines into the Market Street subway. The lines still operate as streetcars on surface streets. The T Third Street and S Shuttle lines added later are true light rail.
San Francisco	Muni	F Market & Wharves	1982	6 mi (9.7 km)	1	Heritage streetcar	Established in 1982 during a closure of the cable car system for refurbishment, to provide an alternative tourist attraction. Streetcars operated on the Market Street tracks recently abandoned by the streetcar lines that became the Muni Metro. Service proved popular and was retained and expanded.

== "Second-generation" modern systems ==
Inspired by the German Stadtbahn (English: city rail) systems, the second generation of modern light rail systems generally have large multi-car trains that travel larger distances, make fewer stops, and run at least partly on exclusive rights-of-way. The first was the San Diego Trolley, which opened in 1981.

City/Area served	State	System	Year opened	System length	Stations	Lines	Year last expanded	Ref.
Baltimore	Maryland	Baltimore Light Rail	1992	33 mi (53 km)	33	3	2006	
Buffalo	New York	Buffalo Metro Rail	1984	6.4 mi (10.3 km)	14	1	1986	
Charlotte	North Carolina	LYNX Blue Line	2007	19.3 mi (31.1 km)	26	1	2018	
Dallas	Texas	DART rail Red, Blue, Green, and Orange lines (Note: This system also includes a hybrid rail line and connections to commuter rail, hybrid rail, and streetcar systems; the figures and statistics presented here represent the light rail portion of the system only.)	1996	93 mi (150 km)	66	4	2025	
Denver	Colorado	RTD Light Rail	1994	60.1 mi (96.7 km)	57	6	2019	
Houston	Texas	METRORail	2004	22.7 mi (36.5 km)	39	3	2017	
Jersey City	New Jersey	Hudson–Bergen Light Rail (NJ Transit)	2000	17 mi (27 km)	24	3	2011	
Los Angeles	California	Metro Rail A, C, E, & K lines (Note: This system also includes rapid transit lines (see List of metro systems), and connections to a commuter rail system; the figures and statistics presented here represent the light rail portion of the system only.)	1990	94.4 mi (151.9 km)	88	4	2025	
Minneapolis–Saint Paul	Minnesota	Metro: Blue & Green lines	2004	21.8 mi (35.1 km)	37	2	2014	
Norfolk	Virginia	The Tide	2011	7.4 mi (11.9 km)	11	1	—	
Phoenix	Arizona	Valley Metro Rail	2008	38.5 mi (62.0 km)	50	2	2025	
Portland	Oregon	MAX Light Rail	1986	60 mi (97 km)	97	5	2015	
Sacramento	California	SacRT light rail	1987	42.9 mi (69.0 km)	53	3	2015	
St. Louis	Missouri and Illinois	MetroLink	1993	46 mi (74 km)	37	2	2006	
Salt Lake City	Utah	TRAX	1999	44.8 mi (72.1 km)	51	3	2013	
San Diego	California	San Diego Trolley	1981	65 mi (105 km)	62	4	2021	
San Jose	California	VTA light rail	1987	42.2 mi (67.9 km)	62	3	2005	
Seattle	Washington	Link light rail	2009	63 mi (101 km)	50	3	2026	

== Streetcar systems ==
Modern streetcar systems generally have smaller single-car trains that travel on short routes with frequent stops in lanes that are shared with automobile traffic (street running). The first was the Portland Streetcar, which opened in 2001. Some are heritage streetcar lines, which run vintage or historic-replica vehicles.

City/Area served	State	System	Year opened	System length	Stops	Lines	Year last expanded	System type	Ref.
Atlanta	Georgia	Atlanta Streetcar (Note: This system also has a heavy rail rapid transit/metro portion (see List of metro systems); the figures and statistics presented here represent the light rail portion of the system only.)	2014	2.7 mi (4.3 km)	12	1	—	Modern	
Charlotte	North Carolina	CityLYNX Gold Line	2015	4 mi (6.4 km)	17	1	2021	Modern	
Cincinnati	Ohio	Connector	2016	3.6 mi (5.8 km)	18	1	—	Modern	
Dallas	Texas	Dallas Streetcar	2015	2.45 mi (3.94 km)	6	1	2016	Modern	
Dallas	Texas	M-Line Trolley	1989	4.6 mi (7.4 km)	40	1	2015	Heritage	
Detroit	Michigan	QLine	2017	3.3 mi (5.3 km)	20	1	—	Modern	
El Paso	Texas	El Paso Streetcar	2018	4.8 mi (8 km)	27	1	—	Heritage	
Kansas City	Missouri	KC Streetcar	2016	6.4 mi (10.3 km)	19	1	2026	Modern	
Kenosha	Wisconsin	Kenosha Streetcar	2000	2 mi (3.2 km)	17	1	—	Heritage	
Little Rock	Arkansas	Metro Streetcar	2004	3.4 mi (5.5 km)	15	1	2007	Heritage	
Memphis	Tennessee	MATA Trolley	1993	6.3 mi (10.1 km)	25	3	2021	Heritage	
Milwaukee	Wisconsin	The Hop	2018	2.5 mi (4 km)	21	2	2023	Modern	
Oklahoma City	Oklahoma	Oklahoma City Streetcar	2018	4.6 mi (7.4 km)	22	2	—	Modern	
Portland	Oregon	Portland Streetcar	2001	7.35 mi (11.83 km)	76	2	2015	Modern	
St. Louis	Missouri	Loop Trolley	2018	2.2 mi (3.5 km)	10	1	—	Heritage	
Salt Lake City	Utah	S Line	2013	2 mi (3.2 km)	7	1	—	Modern	
Seattle	Washington	Seattle Streetcar	2007	3.8 mi (6.1 km)	17	2	2016	Modern	
Tampa	Florida	TECO Line Streetcar	2002	2.7 mi (4.3 km)	11	1	2010	Heritage	
Tempe	Arizona	S Line	2022	3 mi (4.8 km)	14	1	—	Modern	
Tucson	Arizona	Sun Link	2014	3.9 mi (6.3 km)	22	1	—	Modern	

== "Hybrid rail" systems ==
Hybrid rail systems, first introduced to the United States in 2004 with New Jersey's River Line, use passenger trains that operate on the national rail network with vehicles that do not meet Federal Railroad Administration (FRA) Tier I crashworthiness standards. These services typically employ lightweight diesel multiple unit (DMUs) and run on tracks that may also carry freight, with freight train operations usually scheduled outside passenger hours. Unlike conventional commuter rail, hybrid rail provides all-day, seven-day-a-week service, though generally at longer headways than urban light rail.

City / area served	State	System	Year opened	System length	Stations
Camden–Trenton	New Jersey	River Line	2004	54.7 km (34.0 mi)	21
Escondido–Oceanside	California	Sprinter	2008	35.4 km (22.0 mi)	15
Austin	Texas	CapMetro Rail	2010	51.5 km (32.0 mi)	9
Denton–Carrollton	Texas	A-train	2011	33.8 km (21.0 mi)	5
Eastern Contra Costa County	California	eBART	2018	16.1 km (10.0 mi)	2
Fort Worth–DFW Airport	Texas	TEXRail	2019	43.5 km (27.0 mi)	9
Redlands–San Bernardino	California	Arrow	2022	14.5 km (9.0 mi)	5
Tarrant, Dallas, and Collin counties	Texas	Silver Line	2025	26 mi (42 km)	10

== Systems under construction ==
The following table lists entirely new light rail, streetcar, or hybrid rail systems under construction. Systems that are in the planning stages but not yet under construction (e.g. Glassboro–Camden Line, Interborough Express, and the Austin CapMetro Rail Project Connect system), are not listed; expansions of existing systems are also not listed here.

City/Area served	State	System/Line	Planned opening	System length	System type	Ref.
Orange County	California	OC Streetcar	2027	4.1 mi (7 km)	Streetcar	
Omaha	Nebraska	Omaha Streetcar	2028	3.0 mi (4.8 km)	Streetcar	
Montgomery and Prince George's counties	Maryland	Purple Line	2027	16.2 mi (26.1 km)	Light rail	

== See also ==
- List of United States light rail systems by ridership
- List of rail transit systems in the United States
- List of hybrid rail systems in the United States
- List of streetcar systems in the United States
- Light rail in North America
- Streetcars in North America
- Public Transportation in San Diego
- Light rail in New Jersey
- Transportation in Dallas, Texas
- Transportation in Houston
- Transportation in Portland, Oregon
- Transportation in San Francisco
- Transportation in Salt Lake City
- Transportation of St. Louis, Missouri
- Rail transit in metropolitan Denver
- Rail transit in Boston
- Transportation in San Jose, California
- Transportation in Hudson County, New Jersey
- Rail transit in Kenosha, Wisconsin
- Transportation in New York City
