= 1912 in aviation =

This is a list of aviation-related events from 1912:

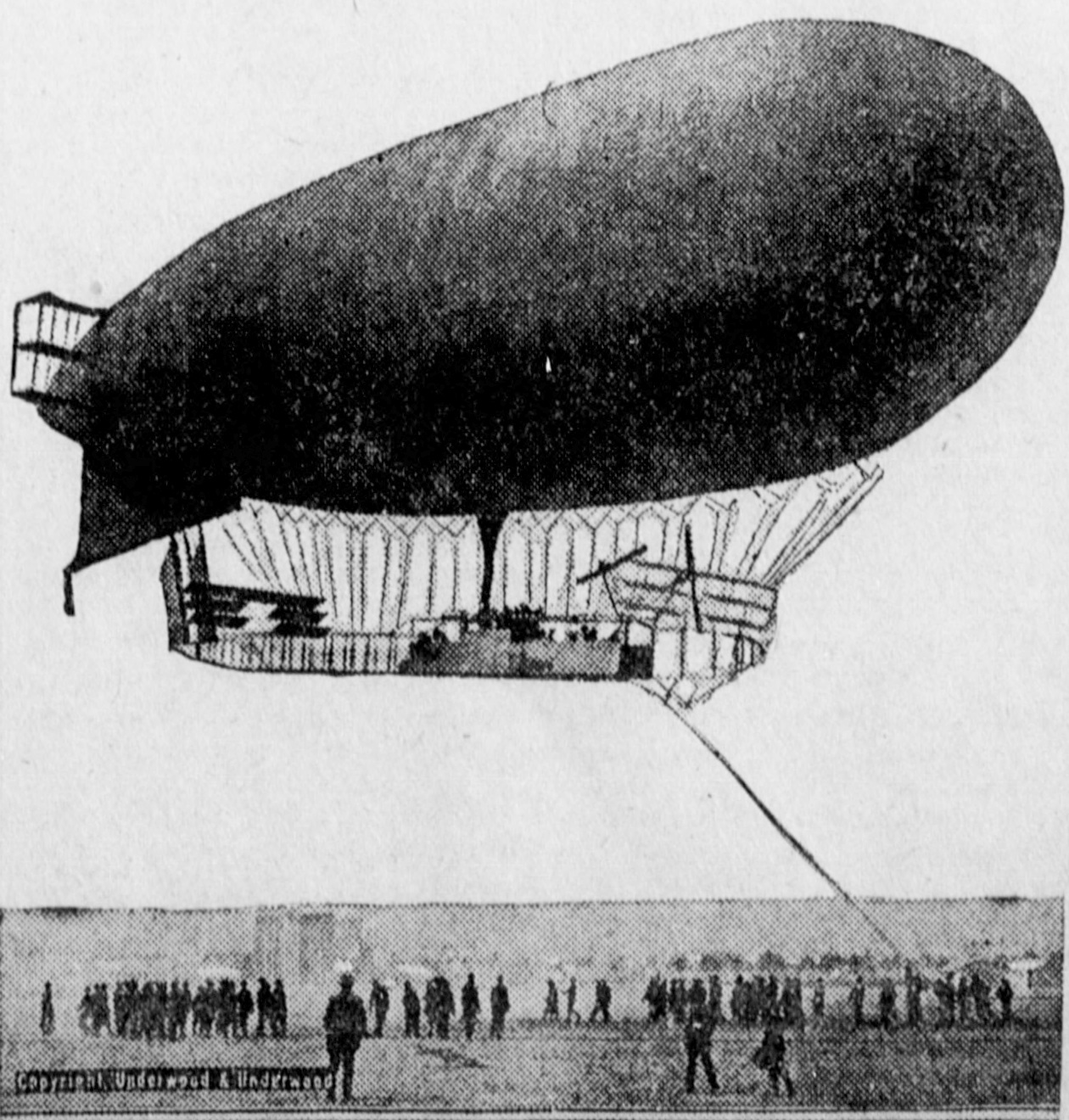
A French dirigible.

== Events ==
- First successful all-metal aircraft flies, the Tubavion monoplane built by Charles Ponche and Maurice Primard in France.
- The French Navy officially establishes an air arm, the Service Aéronautique.
- The first Bulgarian Air Force is formed, using Blériot, Albatros, Farman, Nieuport, Voisin, Somer, Skiorski, and Bristol aircraft (23 in total) to fight in the First Balkan War.
- Captain Alessandro Guidoni of Italy experiments with the air-launching of torpedoes by dropping weights from a Farman biplane.

=== January–March ===
- 10 January
  - Lieutenant Commander Charles Samson flies Short Improved S.27 No. 38 from a platform constructed over the deck of battleship HMS Africa moored in the River Medway, England. It is the United Kingdom's first takeoff by an airplane from a ship.
  - An aircraft drops propaganda leaflets for the first time, when Italian Army Captain Carlo Piazza drops leaflets over Ottoman Army positions in Libya from an airplane during the Italo-Turkish War.
  - Glenn Curtiss pilots the first flight of a flying boat, at Hammondsport, New York.
- 20 January – John Verrept broke the world altitude record with two passengers. He flew up to 1075 metres from Vidamée near Senlis, beating the former record of 896 metres by René Moineau.
- 4 February – In Paris, Austrian-born French inventor Franz Reichelt, the "Flying Tailor," dies in a jump from the Eiffel Tower in an attempt to demonstrate his "parachute-suit," a wearable parachute. The jump is captured on film.
- 5 February – The British Arbitration League, a peace society, issues an appeal against air warfare. Among those signing it are the British physician and author Sir Arthur Conan Doyle, the British novelist and poet Thomas Hardy, and the American painter John Singer Sargent.
- 12 February – Anthony Fokker establishes Fokker Aeroplanbau in Germany, predecessor to Fokker Aircraft Company.
- 17 February
  - Robert G. Fowler completes the first west-to-east flight across the continental United States, arriving in Pablo Beach, Florida, also becoming the second person to complete a U.S. transcontinental flight. After a false start from San Francisco, California, on 11 September 1911, he had begun his journey from Los Angeles, on 19 October 1911. During his journey, he flew the first plane to be launched from a rolling railroad handcar, took up as a passenger Edward Shaw at Beaumont, Texas, allowing Shaw to film the first aerial motion pictures, and made the first air delivery of medicine, during a flight from Jennings to Evangeline, Louisiana. He made 65 forced landings during his journey.
  - English aviator Graham Gilmour is killed when his Martin-Handasyde monoplane, flying from Brooklands, suffers a structural failure and crashes in the Old Deer Park in Richmond, London.
- 22 February – Jules Védrines becomes the first pilot to exceed 100 miles per hour (160 km/h). He makes his flight in a Deperdussin monoplane near Pau, France, flying a distance of 200 km (120 mi) in 1 h 15 min 20.8 s, an average speed of 169 km/h (105 mph).
- 24–25 February – Italian Army Captain Carlo Piazza takes the first wartime reconnaissance photographs from an airplane, photographing Ottoman Army positions in Libya during the Italo-Turkish War.
- March – The conversion of the ex-torpedo boat tender Foudre into the French Navy's first ship capable of carrying and handling airplanes is completed. In her new role, Foudre is the first ship with an airplane hangar. She also is the first warship to be permanently altered for service as an aviation ship.
- 1 March – Albert Berry makes the first parachute jump out of an aeroplane, leaping from a Benoist pusher biplane piloted by Tony Jannus at 1,500 feet (460 meters) over Kinlock Field at Jefferson Barracks in St. Louis, Missouri.
- 5 March – Airships are used for military purposes for the first time, when the Italian dirigibles P2 and P3 begin reconnaissance missions behind Ottoman Army lines west of Tripoli, Libya, during the Italo-Turkish War.

=== April–June ===
- 2 April – Eleanor Trehawke Davies becomes the first woman to cross the English Channel in an airplane, flying as the passenger of Gustav Hamel.
- 3 April – Flying a Wright Model B on a demonstration flight at Long Beach, California, Calbraith Perry Rodgers collides with a seagull, which becomes entangled in his plane's control cables. The plane crashes into the Pacific Ocean, killing Rodgers, who becomes the first fatality in history as the result of a bird strike.
- 16 April – American aviator Harriet Quimby becomes the first woman to fly the English Channel, making the crossing from Dover, England, to France in 59 minutes.
- 17 April – Austrian physicist Victor Hess ascends in a balloon during a nearly total solar eclipse – one of ten balloon flights he makes between 1911 and 1913 to study ionization in the atmosphere – and notes that ionization does not decrease with the sun blocked by the moon. He concluders that the source of ionization is not the sun, but rather something farther out in space. His flight marks the discovery of what American physicist Robert Millikan in 1925 will name cosmic rays.
- 19 April – An Italian blimp takes the first known motion pictures of enemy positions, filming Ottoman Army positions in Libya during the Italo-Turkish War.
- 22 April – Englishman Denys Corbett Wilson completes the first completely successful aeroplane crossing of the Irish Sea, from Goodwick in Wales to Crane near Enniscorthy in Ireland (Robert Loraine's flight in 1910, often credited as the first crossing, landed 200 feet short).
- May – A recommendation is made that the French Navy investigate the design and procurement of an aircraft carrier with a flight deck. For the first time, an armored hangar is suggested for such a ship. Plans for the ship are cancelled about 1917 prior to any construction.
- 9 May – Commander Charles Rumney Samson becomes the first person to fly an aircraft off the deck of a moving ship. He takes off in Short Improved S.27 No.38 from a ramp built over the deck of the battleship HMS Hibernia in Weymouth Bay.
- 13 May
  - George V approves the formation of the Royal Flying Corps. Under overall control of the British Army, it includes all British military and naval aircraft, organized into a Military Wing and a Naval Wing.
  - A Flanders F.3 Monoplane crashes at Brooklands, Surrey, in the United Kingdom, killing both people on board. The Public Safety and Accidents Investigation Committee of the Royal Aero Club looks into the causes of the incident in history's first aviation accident investigation resulting in a published report. The report, which blames the accident on pilot error, will appear in the publication Flight on 8 June 1912.
- 19 May – As a curious crowd looks on, the Italian engineer Giuseppe Bellanca teaches himself to fly in series of short, tentative hops at Mineola Field on Long Island outside Mineola, New York. His success prompts him to establish the Bellanca School of Flying, which he operates from 1912 to 1916.
- 22 May – United States Marine Corps First Lieutenant Alfred A. Cunningham reports to the Naval Aviation Camp at the United States Naval Academy in Annapolis, Maryland, to begin training as the U.S. Marine Corps's first aviator. The date is considered the birth date of U.S. Marine Corps aviation.
- 27 May – The world's first seaplane carrier, the French Navy's Foudre, embarks her first floatplane, a Canard Voisin.
- 30 May – Wilbur Wright, co-inventor of the airplane, dies in Dayton, Ohio, of typhoid fever.
- June
  - Sopwith Aviation Company founded.
  - The Imperial Japanese Navy takes its first step toward establishing an aviation arm, establishing the Naval Aeronautical Research Committee.
- 1 June – The first aeroplane flight in Norway is made by Secondløytnant Hans Dons in the Royal Norwegian Navy's first aircraft, the Rumpler Taube floatplane Start. He flies 48 kilometers (30 miles) from Gannestad to Øra in 35 minutes.
- 2 June – The Lewis machine gun is first tested in an aircraft by the United States Army. This weapon would go on to become the standard armament of many fighter aircraft during World War I.
- 8 June
  - The Italian dirigibles P2 and P3 discover and make a highly effective bombing attack against Ottoman Army cavalry during a battle at Zanzur in the Italo-Turkish War, making an important contribution to the Italian Army's offense in the battle.
  - The first annual Aerial Derby takes place, sponsored by the Daily Mail. Seven participants flying a single circuit of an 81-mile (130-kilometer) course, starting and finishing at Hendon Aerodrome in London, with control points at Kempton Park, Esher, Purley, and Purfleet. A crowd of 45,000 spectators pays to see the start and finish, and large numbers of people watch the race along its route. Thomas Sopwith wins in a Bleriot XI-2 with a time of 1 hour 23 minutes 8.4 seconds, winning £250 and a gold cup.
- 10 June – The Austro-Hungarian submarine U-5 tows a kite balloon, apparently to determine the best coloration for submarines to avoid detection while underwater. Other than the experimental use of incendiary balloons from SMS Vulcano to bombard Venice in 1849 by its predecessor the Austrian Navy, it is the only operation of an observation balloon by the Austro-Hungarian Navy.
- 11 June – Silas Christofferson flies a biplane eight miles (13 kilometres) from a 170-foot-long (52-meter) ramp on the roof of the 150-foot-tall (46-meter) Multnomah Hotel in Portland, Oregon, to the Vancouver Barracks in Vancouver, Washington. A crowd of over 45,000 observes the flight, which takes him 12 minutes. The Oregonian claims that he is the first person to trust "his heavier-than-air machine in a start from the midst of a business section of a great city."
- 19 June – The Royal Flying Corps's Central Flying School opens at Upavon, Wiltshire.
- 27 June – Following successes using aircraft against the Turks in North Africa, Italy forms a specialised Air Battalion (Battagliore Aviatori).

=== July–September ===
- 1 July – During an air show, Harriet Quimby and a meet organizer flying with her as a passenger die in an airplane crash in Dorchester Bay off Boston, Massachusetts, in the United States.
- 2 July
  - Denmark establishes an army air corps. It is the predecessor of the Danish Air Force .
  - An attempt at the first transatlantic flight fails when Melvin Vaniman's dirigible Akron explodes shortly after takeoff, 500 feet (150 meters) over the North Atlantic Ocean off Atlantic City, New Jersey, killing Vaniman, his brother Carl Vaniman, and all three others on board.
- 26 July – France is the first country to use national markings on military aircraft other than a flag when they decree that military aircraft should display the manufacturer and serial number, the maximum load and roundels on the fuselage and wings.
- 31 July – The United States Navy tests an aircraft catapult for the first time. The test, which is conducted ashore, is a failure, as the aircraft is badly damaged.
- 1 August – The United States Marine Corps's first aviator, First Lieutenant Alfred A. Cunningham, makes his first solo flight, piloting a "hydroplane" (floatplane) in Massachusetts.
- 2 August – Start of British Military Aeroplane Competition at Larkhill on Salisbury Plain for aircraft to meet the requirements of the newly formed Royal Flying Corps. The competition attracts 32 entrants and is won by S. F. Cody with his Cody V biplane.
- 10 August – Frank McClean flies a Short Brothers floatplane up the River Thames between the upper and lower parts of Tower Bridge and underneath London Bridge.
- 16 August – Glenn L. Martin founds the first Glenn L. Martin Company.
- 6 September – Royal Flying Corps members Captain Patrick Hamilton and Lieutenant Athole Wyness Stuart are killed in a crash near Willian, Hertfordshire flying a Deperdussin monoplane.
- 7 September – The French aviator Roland Garros sets a world altitude record of 13,200 feet (4,000 meters).
- 8 September – The Argentine Air Force is formed as a flying school at El Palomar, the military airport near Buenos Aires.
- 9 September – Flying a Deperdussin Monocoque monoplane, Jules Védrines wins the fourth Gordon Bennett Trophy race at a speed of 169.7 km/h (105.4 mph)
- 10 September – A third fatal accident involving a Royal Flying Corps monoplane occurs when a Bristol Coanda monoplane crashes near Wolvercote (Oxford), killing Lieutenants E. Hotchkiss and C. Bettington. These accidents lead to a ban on the use of monoplanes by the RFC.
- 25 September – Charles Voisin dies and Raymonde de Laroche suffers serious injuries in an automobile accident near Lyon, France.
- 21 September – First flight from Kjeller Airport, the first airport established in Norway.
- 30 September – Igor Sikorsky wins the international military competition at Petrograd flying the S-6-B.

=== October–December ===
- 6 October – At Yokosuka Naval Air Technical Arsenal, Japan, Lieutenant Yōzō Kaneko makes the Imperial Japanese Navy's first flight, piloting a Farman seaplane for 15 minutes and reaching an altitude of 30 meters (98 feet).
- 16 October – The second use of an aerial bomb and an airplane as a bomber takes place when Bulgarian Army Aviation Department pilots Radul Milkov and Prodan Tarakchiev, flying an Albatros F.II, bomb the Turkish railway station of Karaagac (near Edirne), during the First Balkan War.
- 22 October – The Australian Flying Corps is formed.
- The British Admiralty establishes an air department and orders the Vickers E.F.B.1, the first British airplane built as an armed fighting aircraft.
- 2 November – The first airplane flights in Japan by Imperial Japanese Navy personnel are made by two officers at Yokosuka Naval Air Technical Arsenal using Farman and Curtiss seaplanes.
- 12 November
  - The first demonstration of naval aircraft at an Imperial Japanese Navy fleet review takes place at Yokohama, with Lieutenant Yōzō Kaneko flying a Farman seaplane and Lieutenant Sankichi Kōno a Curtiss seaplane.
  - A Curtiss Triad becomes the first aircraft to be launched by catapult, at the U.S. Navy's Washington Navy Yard in Washington, D.C.
- 19 November – Italy's colonial air force is established as the Servizio d'Aviazione Coloniale.
- 28 November – The Italian Air Battalion is made a fully operational command, the (Flotta Aerea d'Italia).
- The United States Navy launches a flying boat by catapult for the first time.
- William Beardmore and Company proposes the first Royal Navy aircraft carrier with a flight deck - a 450-foot (140-meter), 15,000-ton ship capable of carrying ten airplanes – to the British Admiralty. The Admiralty rejects the proposal on the grounds of insufficient experience with operation of aircraft at sea.
- 16 December – Tony Jannus arrives in New Orleans, Louisiana, completing a flight from Omaha, Nebraska, over the Missouri and Mississippi rivers in a Benoist Type XII floatplane he had begun on November 6. The 1,973-mile (3,177-km) journey sets a new distance record for overwater flight, and the 42 aerial exhibitions Jannus has performed along the way have exposed thousands of people in the central and southern United States to aviation.
- 31 December – The Royal Navy has 16 aircraft in service – eight biplane landplanes, five monoplane landplanes, and three "hydro-aeroplanes."

== Births ==
- March 29 – Hanna Reitsch, German soldier and pilot (d. 1979)
- November 6 – Whitney Straight, American-born British Air Commodore, motor racing driver and businessman (d. 1979)

== Deaths ==
- February 17 – Graham Gilmour, English aviator (b. 1885)
- April 3 – Cal Rodgers, American aviator (b. 1879)
- May 30 – Wilbur Wright, American aviation pioneer (b. 1867)
- June 1 – Philip Parmalee, American aviator (b. 1887)
- June 12 – Hubert Latham, French aviation pioneer (b. 1883)
- July 1 – Harriet Quimby, American aviator and film writer (b. 1875)
- August 26 – Fung Joe Guey, Chinese aviation pioneer (b. 1883)
- September 14 – Howard W. Gill American aviator (b. 1882)
- September 28 – Lewis C. Rockwell American aviation pioneer (b. 1885)

== First flights ==
=== January ===
- 10 January – Short S.36

=== February ===
- Royal Aircraft Factory BE.2 flown by designer Geoffrey de Havilland.

=== March ===
- Bristol-Coanda monoplane
- 1 March – AEA Cygnet
- 3 March – Avro Type E, later renamed the Avro 500

=== April ===
- 2 April Short S.41

=== May ===
- 1 May Avro Type F
- 24 May Short S.45

=== June ===
- June 9 or 10 – Caudron Type B Multiplace

=== August ===
- Avro Type G

=== September ===
- ca. September – Caudron Type E
