= Hugh Robinson (aviator) =

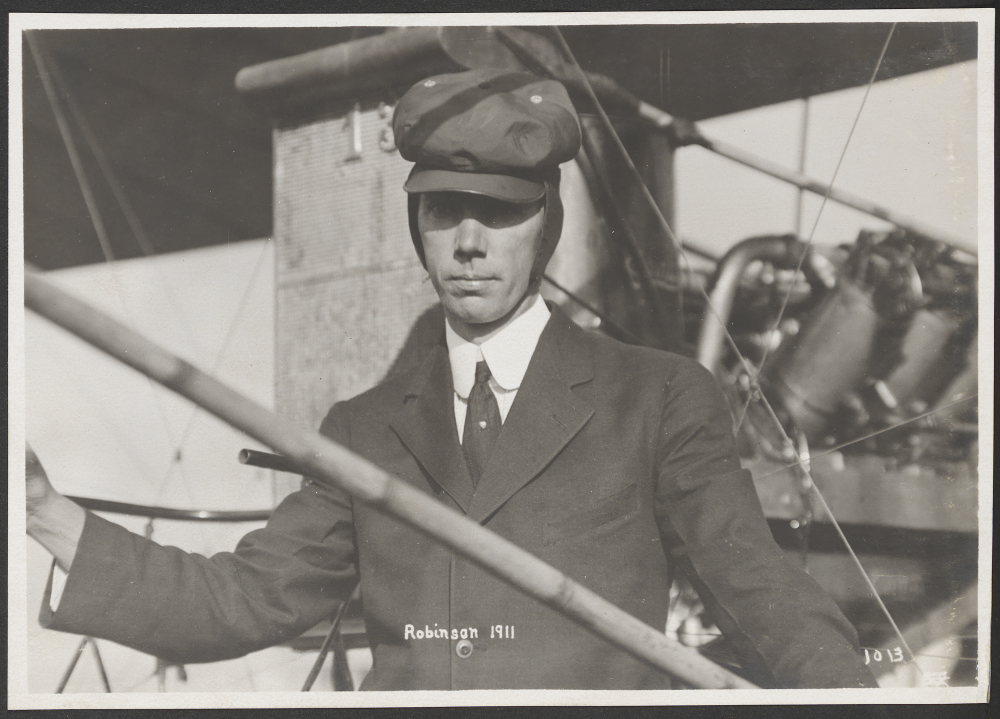
Hugh Robinson in 1911.

Hugh Armstrong Robinson (May 13, 1881 – 1963) was an American pioneer in the earliest days of aviation, combining his skills as inventor, pilot, and daredevil. He is said to have been the third person to successfully fly an aircraft after the Wright Brothers in an aircraft of his own design and construction, and the first person to make an air-sea rescue.

His many firsts include the first medical flight transporting a doctor to a patient in Hammond, N.Y. in June 1912, and the first U.S. airmail flight in 1911. Robinson also devised the term and art of dive-bombing.

== Biography ==
Robinson was born on May 13, 1881, in Neosho, Missouri.

In late 1910, Hugh Robinson became a pilot and chief engineer for Glenn Curtiss at Curtiss School of Aviation, Rockwell Field, North Island, San Diego. There he coined the term and invented the tailhook system that helped make possible Eugene Ely's first ever flight, on January 18, 1911, to the deck of a ship, the USS Pennsylvania, by allowing the airplane to stop quickly and safely. This system is used by Navies worldwide to the present day.

Robinson took part in Curtiss' development of seaplanes. In 1911, he took a seaplane on the exhibition circuit, flying at demonstrations and fairs across North America and Europe.

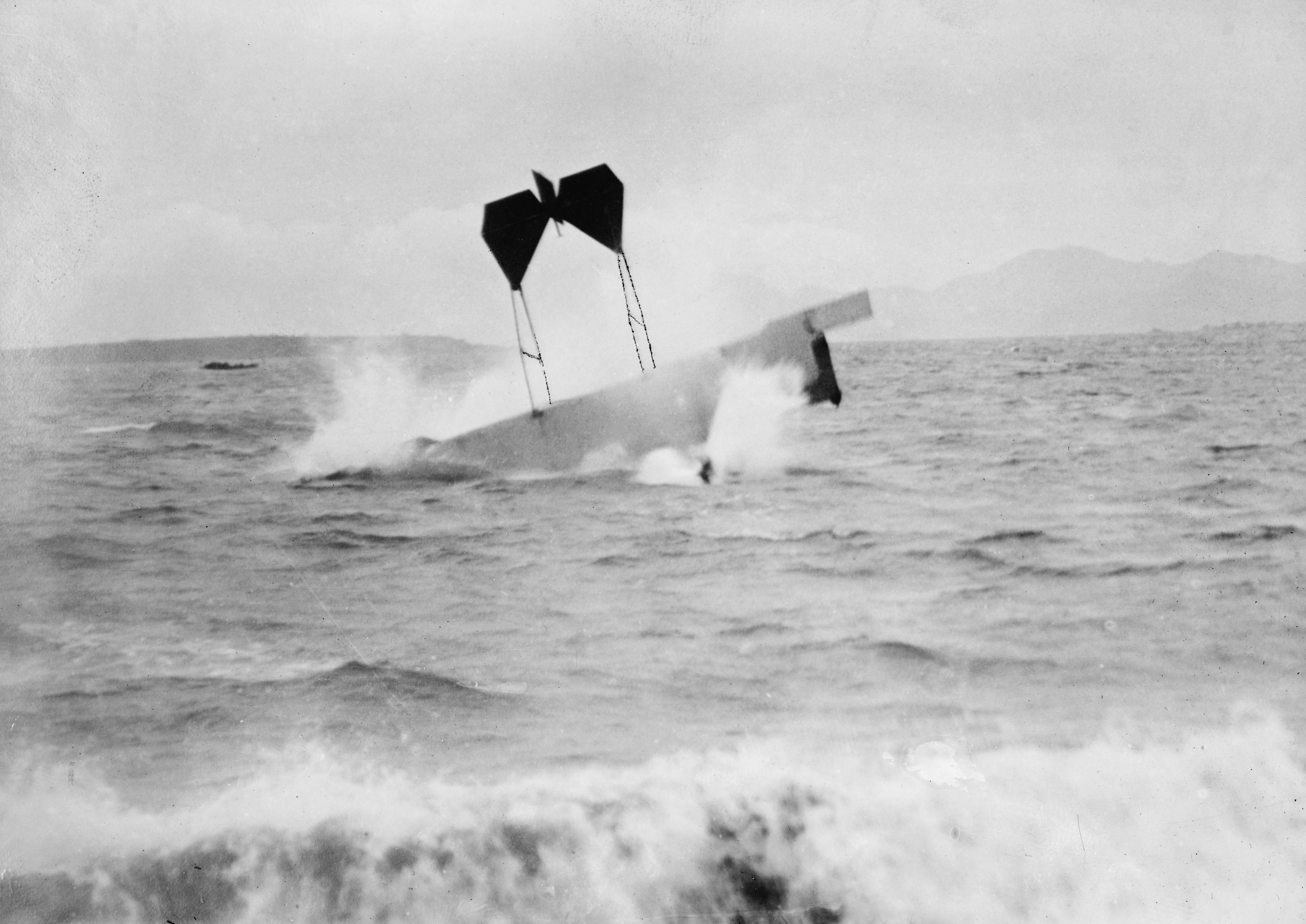
Robinson crashes into the sea in Europe at Monaco in 1912. He survived the crash.

At Kinloch Field in St. Louis, Missouri, on March 1, 1912, Albert Berry made the first successful parachute jump, from a Benoist Aircraft, designed and built by Hugh Robinson and Thomas W. Benoist. He landed safely on the Jefferson Barracks parade grounds. The parachute and the apparatus used to support and release it were designed and built by Robinson. Also in 1912, Robinson took a Curtiss Model E seaplane to Europe at Monaco, and flew impressively in an aviation meet there.

During the Great Lakes Reliability Cruise in 1913, Thomas Benoist entered three aircraft, flown by Antony Jannus, Hugh Robinson, and Benoist himself.

Robinson performed a motorcycle stunt dubbed the "Circle of Death". The Neosho Daily News February 3, 1914, reported, "Instead of using the revolving globe, his is a revolving ring, fourteen feet in diameter, latticed or banded in such a way that he is plainly visible at all times to the audience. Inside of the ring is a single track, twenty-four inches wide, upon which he rides his motorcycle. The effect of the act given by the ring revolving in numerous different ways makes the audience see him ride in a different direction at each revolution of the ring. The entire ring and motorcycle are illuminated with electric lights, and give a wonderful effect."

The account states that the act ran 12 extra hazardous minutes and that Robinson would "give his act, which he calls the Circle of Death, a try out at the Princess Theatre"...and would be with the Barnum & Bailey Circus that summer. It was the highest paid act at the time.

Robinson was the first person to complete a 360-degree vertical loop in an aircraft, and the first right turn; it was previously thought this maneuver would tear the plane apart.

After a long danger-filled life, surviving 15 major crashes and a massive train wreck, he died not quite two months short of his 81st birthday, March 23, 1963, of natural causes at his home at Tacoma Park, MD.

== Legacy ==
In 1999, U.S. Congressman Roy Blunt gave a tribute to Hugh Armstrong Robinson. It is recorded in the Congressional Record, v.145, pt.11. Shortly after, during Neosho's Independence Day Celebration the Neosho Municipal Airport, Neosho, Missouri, was dedicated and renamed Neosho Hugh Robinson Airport in his honor.

== Resources ==
- Hugh Robinson - Pioneer Aviator(1995), George L. Vergara. Gainesville, FL: University Press of Florida. ISBN 0-8130-1361-5
