= Edmund Roberts =

Edmund Roberts may refer to:

- Edmund Roberts (diplomat) (1784–1836), US diplomat to the Far East
- Edmund W. Roberts (1866–1947), US inventor and engineer, founder of the Roberts Motor Company
- Edmund Robert Harris (c. 1804–1877), English lawyer
- Edmund Roberts Larken (1809–1895), English cleric and socialist
