= Thomas W. Benoist =

Thomas Wesley Benoist
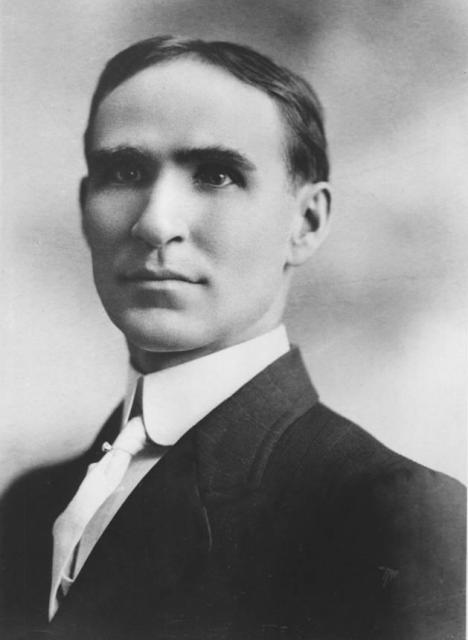
- Born: December 29, 1874; Irondale, Missouri, US
- Died: June 14, 1917 (aged 42); Sandusky, Ohio, US
- Resting place: Hopewell Cemetery, Hopewell, Washington County, Missouri
- Occupations: Aviator; Aircraft designer Aircraft manufacturer Airline entrepreneur

Thomas W. Benoist (December 29, 1874 – June 14, 1917) was an American aviator and aircraft manufacturer. In an aviation career of only ten years, he formed the world's first aircraft parts distribution company, established one of the leading early American aircraft manufacturing companies and a successful flying school, and from January to April 1914 operated the world's first scheduled airline.

== Biography ==
=== Early life ===
Thomas Wesley Benoist was born on December 29, 1874, in Irondale, Missouri, the son of Pierre E. Benoist and the former Anna S. Gregory. One of the first industrialists in St. Louis, Missouri, he was a successful businessman in the automobile industry by 1904.

=== Louisiana Purchase Exposition ===
In 1904, Benoist was among the sponsors of an unsuccessful lighter-than-air flying machine somewhat similar to a helicopter which the balloonist John Berry attempted to fly at that year's Louisiana Purchase Exposition, also known as the St. Louis World's Fair. While attending the fair, he observed an observation balloon tethered at an altitude of 1,000 feet (300 meters) and glider demonstrations by William Avery, an associate of the noted aviation pioneer Octave Chanute. Despite the failure of Berry's aircraft, what Benoist saw at the fair piqued his interest in aviation, and he oriented his future career toward it.

=== Aerosco ===
In 1907, Benoist in partnership with E. Percy Noel founded the Aeronautic Supply Company, known as Aerosco, the world's first aircraft parts distributor. At first, Aerosco limited itself to dealing in raw materials and parts for use in aviation experiments, but it soon expanded to sell kits allowing customers to assemble complete airplanes, including those by leading manufacturers of the day, such as Blériot monoplanes, Curtiss biplanes, Farman biplanes, and Wright Flyers. It also sold a wide range of books on aviation topics.

=== Aviator ===
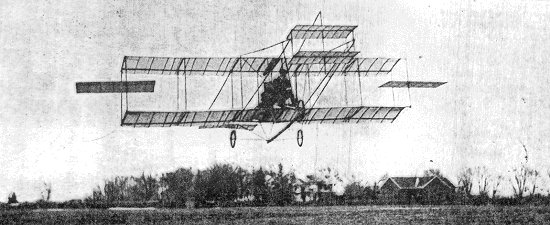
Benoist making his first flight, in a Gill-Curtiss biplane at Kinloch Field in Kinloch, Missouri, on September 18, 1910.

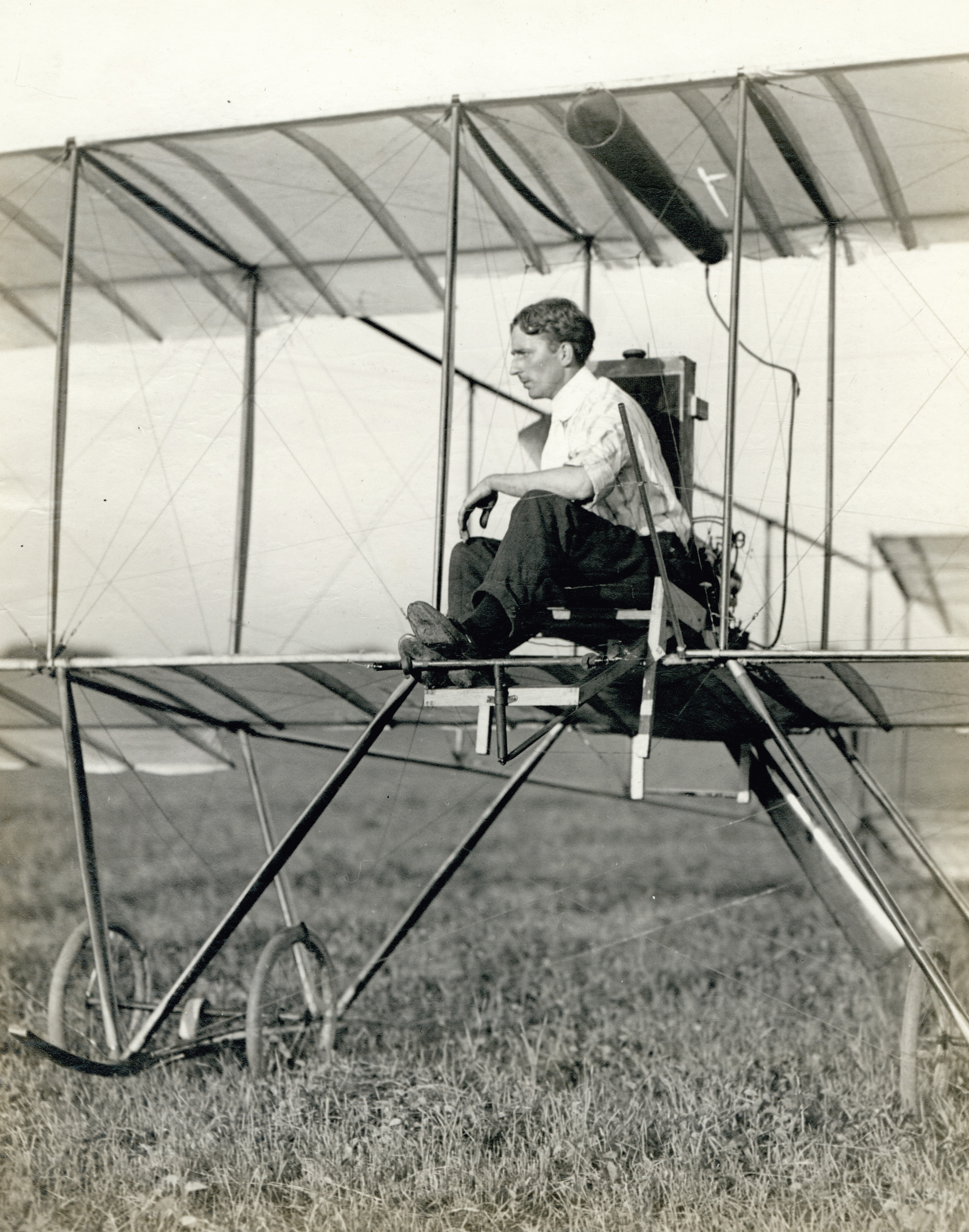
Tom Benoist seated in an airplane of his own design and make at the 1910 International Aeronautic Tournament at Kinloch Field. Missouri History Museum.

Benoist soon purchased a Curtiss-type airplane built by Howard Gill and learned to fly it, making his first flight on September 18, 1910, at the Kinloch Park Aero Club field in Kinloch, Missouri. He gave flying exhibitions in the Midwestern and Southern United States, but an injury he suffered in a flying mishap during one of them prevented him from taking part in an international aviation meet in mid-October 1910.

=== Aerosco Flying School and Benoist Aircraft Company ===
In March 1911, Benoist established the Aerosco Flying School at Kinloch Field, and it soon drew students from throughout the United States; it later was renamed the Benoist Flying School. At around the same time, he bought out his partner and moved the original Aerosco company to a larger facility in a suburb of St. Louis, renaming it the Benoist Aircraft Company. With the name change, he reoriented the company from dealing in aviation parts and kits for aircraft by other manufacturers to building airplanes of original design. As an intermediate step, he designed and manufactured a version of the Curtiss-Gill airplane he had purchased in 1910. The flying school and manufacturing concern were both so successful that Benoist airplanes and pilots soon were appearing all over the United States.

On October 20, 1911, the Benoist Aircraft factory burned to the ground, destroying five complete airplanes, many tools, machinery, and all of the company's files. Although the loss was not insured, Benoist bounced back quickly, opening a new factory nearby, bringing aviator Tony Jannus – who would soon become its chief pilot – into the company in November 1911, and designing and building the first Benoist airplane of completely original design, the Type XII Headless, before the end of 1911.

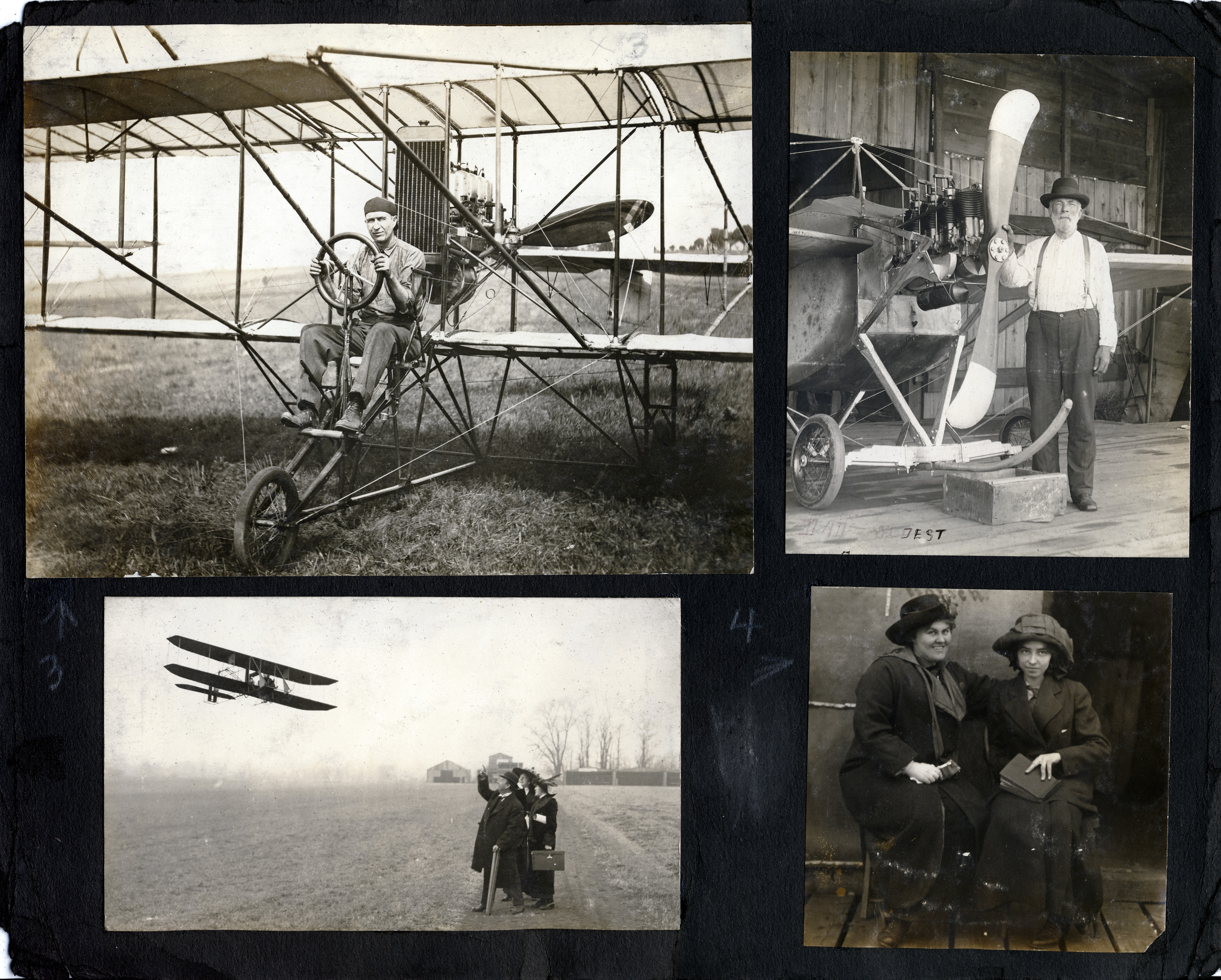
Composite photograph of a man and two women watching a Benoist airplane in flight at Kinloch Field. Photographs by Russell Froelich, c. 1910-1912. Missouri History Museum.

By 1912, Benoist Aircraft was one of the leading aircraft companies in the world. The Type XII Headless made history when, piloted by Jannus, it carried Albert Berry over Kinloch Field on March 1, 1912, and Berry made the world's first successful parachute jump from an airplane. Improvements in the Type XII led to the development of the Land Tractor Type XII later in the year, which, configured as a floatplane, set a distance record for overwater flight in a journey of 1,973 miles (3,175 km) down the Missouri and Mississippi rivers from Omaha, Nebraska, to New Orleans, Louisiana, between November 6 and December 16, 1912. Jannus performed 42 aerial exhibitions during the trip, exposing thousands of people in the central and southern United States to aviation.

In December 1912, Benoist Aircraft produced its first flying boat, the Type XIII Lake Cruiser, which the company demonstrated widely during the summer of 1913. A larger Type XIV flying boat soon followed.

During the Great Lakes Reliability Cruise in 1913, Benoist entered three aircraft, flown by Antony Jannus, Hugh Robinson, and Benoist himself. Throughout the spring and summer, Aero and Hydro, a newsletter published by Benoist's partner E. Percy Noel, promoted the Reliability Cruise, listing Benoist aircraft as the first three entrants.

=== First scheduled airline ===
In 1913, Percival E. Fansler brought in Benoist to start an air passenger service using Benoist Aircraft's new flying boats to connect St. Petersburg and Tampa, Florida, two cities that otherwise were a day's travel apart at the time. Benoist signed a three-month contract to provide the service with the St. Petersburg Board of Trade on December 17, 1913, subsidizing 50% of the costs for starting the airline. Benoist initiated the service, the St. Petersburg-Tampa Airboat Line, using a Benoist XIV flying boat, on January 1, 1914. It was the first scheduled airline service in the world. Two Benoist XIVs provided twice-daily service across Tampa Bay and by the time the initial contract expired on March 31, 1914, had transported 1,204 passengers without injury, losing only four days to mechanical problems. A decline in business led the airline to shut down in late April 1914 and sell its two flying boats.

=== Transatlantic flight ambition ===
In early 1913, Benoist and Jannus initiated the development of a large new flying boat capable of transatlantic flight. When in early 1914 the Daily Mail of London offered a $50,000 prize for the first transatlantic flight of under 72 hours, the two men developed the Type XV flying boat, capable of remaining aloft for 40 hours with six passengers on board. It was ready to fly in 1915, but by then the outbreak of World War I in late July 1914 had made a transatlantic attempt impossible. Benoist Aircraft and the St. Louis Car Company jointly proposed the construction of 5,000 Type XVs for the United Kingdom for use on antisubmarine patrols, but the British preferred Curtiss flying boats and nothing came of the idea.

=== Financial troubles and later designs ===
Unable to secure a large contract for its airplanes during the war, Benoist Aircraft began to experience financial problems by 1915. To reduce costs, Benoist moved the company first to Chicago, Illinois, and then to Sandusky, Ohio, where it affiliated with the Roberts Motor Company, which was Benoist's preferred source for aircraft engines. Benoist designed the Type XVI flying boat and Type XVII landplane, both of which appeared in 1916.

=== Death ===
On June 14, 1917, Benoist died when he struck his head against a telephone pole while stepping off a streetcar in front of the Roberts Motor Company in Sandusky. With him gone and facing continued financial problems, the Benoist Aircraft Company and the Roberts Motor Company both went out of business in early 1918. Benoist Aircraft had built just over 100 airplanes in its history by the time it ceased operations.

Benoist is buried at Hopewell Cemetery in Hopewell in Washington County, Missouri.
