= Grant Morton =

Grant Morton (1857?–1920), born William H. Morton, was one of the first people to successfully attempt skydiving, and is sometimes credited with the first skydive and jump from a powered aeroplane, in 1911. Supposedly, at age 54, Morton, a veteran career parachutist, made the first dive by jumping from a Wright Model B over Venice, California.

== Near death incidents ==
On May 15, 1905, Grant Morton ascended in a balloon to 5,000 feet (1,500 m). At some point he became injured and began bleeding, becoming unconscious, but descended safely with his body lashed to the balloon's trapeze. On July 2, 1905, Morton was nearly killed during an exhibition at Urbita Springs, San Bernardino, California. He was ascending in a hot-air balloon when the balloon hit tree limbs and gas began to escape. The balloon, however, reached a height of 200 feet (61 m) before falling rapidly and hitting another tree. Morton was taken to the county hospital with a broken shoulder amongst other injuries but was expected to recover. Some weeks later in August 1905 Morton had another incident in a balloon, again at Urbita Springs, when the balloon he was ascending in became a runaway and Morton jumped clear allowing the vessel to float away on its own. Because of his various injuries Morton had become incapacitated by October and was unable to work putting him and his wife in poverty. His wife sought to go out and work which angered Morton and he is reported to have engaged in spousal abuse over his wife working against his wishes.

== Morton vs. Albert Berry controversy ==
An article in Air & Space/Smithsonian magazine (dated February 29 and March 1, 2012) makes a claim that U.S. Army Captain Albert Berry was the first to jump from a powered airplane on March 1, 1912 (with Anthony Jannus as his pilot) and that Morton did so on April 28, 1912, which would give priority to Berry, providing it was Morton's first airplane jump and not his second or third. The article states Morton's jump of April 28, 1912 to have been at 2,600 feet (790 m) feet over Venice Beach with Phil Parmalee as his pilot. Several accounts published throughout the last one hundred years consistently give the 1911 jump date for Morton's first airplane jump and that it was at more than 4,000 feet (1,200 m) and closer to Los Angeles itself, Venice Beach being a suburb of the larger city. This would be a difference of over 1,400 feet (430 m), significant differences in altitude.
