= Benoist XV =

XV
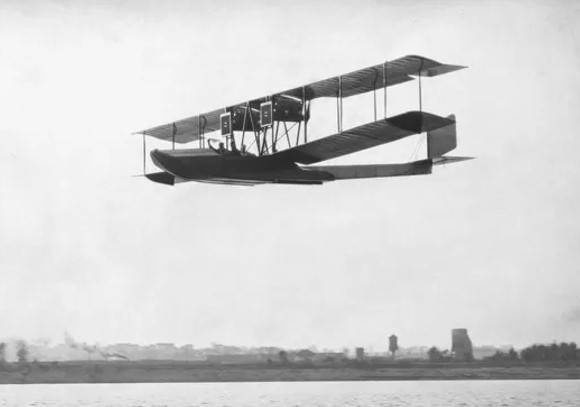

General information
- Type: Airliner
- Manufacturer: Benoist
- Designer: Thomas W. Benoist
- Number built: 1

History
- First flight: 1915

The Benoist XV, also called Type 15 and Type C, was a small biplane flying boat built by Benoist Aircraft in the United States in 1915, originally to compete for a transatlantic flight prize, and later marketed as an anti-submarine patrol aircraft for the British government, and also to carry paying passengers.

== Design and development ==
The aircraft was a conventional biplane with equal-span unstaggered wings. The engines were mounted above the cockpit beside each other and drove two pusher propellers. Accommodation for the pilot and five passengers was side by side in an open cockpit.

== Operational history ==
Benoist built the type XV twin-engine flying boat with hopes to market it as an anti-submarine patrol aircraft for the British government. A round-the-world publicity tour was scheduled and a merger with the Meissner's company to make a thousand examples were in the works when World War I tensions cancelled the efforts.

== Specifications ==
General characteristics

- Crew: one pilot
- Capacity: 5 passenger
- Wingspan: 65 ft 0 in (19.8 m)
- Powerplant: 2 × Roberts pusher engine , 100 hp (75 kW) each

Performance

- Endurance: 40 hours

Armament
Unknown: anti-submarine armaments

== See also ==
- Pusher aircraft

== Sources ==
- "The Benoist Flying Boat". Flight: A Journal Devoted to the Interests, Practice, and Progress of Aerial Locomotion and Transport. VIIL (15). 13 April 1916.
