= Roberts Motor Company =

American engine manufacturer

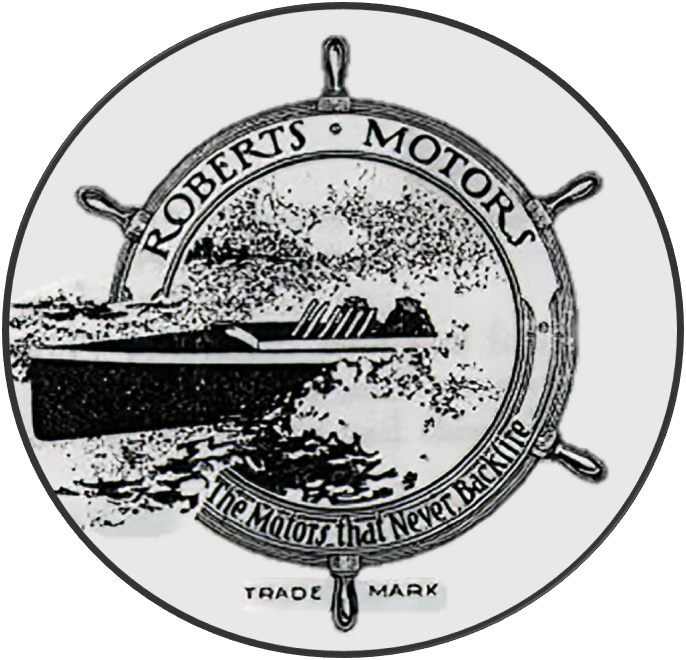
- Trade name: Roberts Motor Manufacturing Company; Roberts Motors
- Industry: Engine manufacturing
- Founded: 1905 in Clyde, Ohio
- Founder: Edmund W. Roberts; Benjamin L. Roberts
- Fate: Became the Johnston Motor Company in 1935
- Headquarters: Sandusky, Ohio
- Key people: B. L. Roberts (President, 1905 - 1914); E. W. Roberts (Vice-president and Designer, 1905–1914); William Burke (President, 1914-1915); Earl Johnston (Superintendent, 1915–1918; Owner, 1918–1935)
- Brands: Roberts

Roberts Motor Company was an American manufacturer of lightweight, high-speed engines for aircraft, boats, stationary, and automobiles, based in Ohio during the early 1900s.

== Company history ==
=== 1905 - 1914 (Roberts Motor Company) ===
The company originated in 1905 in Clyde and moved to Sandusky, both in Ohio, in 1908. It was cofounded by Benjamin Leacock "B. L." Roberts and his brother, Edmund Willson "E. W." Roberts, a mechanical engineer, engine designer, inventor, patent agent, and prolific author of gas engineering books. E. W. Roberts was known for being chief assistant to Hiram Maxim in his 1894 'flying machine' project in Kent, England and a designer of a large wind tunnel for Maxim. Prior to founding his company, Edmund Roberts was chief engineer at the Elmore Manufacturing Company. He was one of the top leading gas engine designers from the 1900-1915 period.

According to the Smithsonian Institution, which has a few Roberts engines in its collection, the Roberts Motor Company produced more engines during this pre-WWI period than Hall-Scott and Curtiss Motor Company put together.

=== 1914 - 1917 (Roberts Motor Manufacturing Company) ===
Roberts left the company in 1914 when the company faced financial trouble, and became editor of The Gas Engine magazine before starting a private consulting practice for engine design. According to an Early Bird of Aviation from Sandusky, Reinhardt Ausmus, "the company spent more in national advertizing than they took in on sales." William H. Burke took over as president and the company produced several automobiles in 1915, powered with the company's engines. The name of the company also changed to Roberts Motor Manufacturing Company, and not much was heard from the company after 1915.

=== 1918 - 1935 (Roberts Motors) ===
The Roberts Motor Manufacturing Company ceased operations upon the tragic death of Thomas Benoist in 1918, who had been affiliated with the company. Earl Johnston, who had taken over as superintendent in 1915, purchased the company in 1918. Subsequently, the company shifted its focus to engines for boats rather than aircraft, and began to operate under the name, Roberts Motors. In 1935, the company became a new incorporation with a new name, the Johnston Motor Co.

== Products ==
=== Aircraft engines ===
Model name	Configuration	Power	Bore x Stroke	Weight	Year
Roberts Model 4-X	I4	50 hp @ 1400 RPM	4.5"x5"	170 lbs.	1911-1912
Roberts Model 4-X	I4	65 hp @ 1200 RPM	5"x5"	230 lbs.	1912-1916
Roberts Model 6-X	I6	75 hp @ 1200 RPM	4.5"x5"	243 lbs.	1911-1912
Roberts Model 6-X	I6	100 hp @ 1200 RPM	5"x5"	330-350 lbs.	1911-1917
Roberts Model 6-X	I6	100 hp @ 1200 RPM	5"x5.5"	368 lbs.	1916
Roberts Model 6-XX	I6	125 hp @ 1100 RPM	5.5"x6"	390 lbs.	1912
Roberts Model 6-XX	I6	165 hp @ 1200 RPM	6"x6"	650 lbs.	1917
Roberts Model 6-XX	I6	200 hp @ 1400 RPM	6.5"x6"	690 lbs.	
Roberts Model E-12	V12	350 hp @ 1200 RPM	6"x6.5"	990 lbs.	1916-1917

=== Boat engines ===
Model name	Configuration	Power	Bore x Stroke	Weight	Year
Roberts Model A	I1	25 hp @ 950 RPM - 35 hp @ 1450 RPM	4"x5"		1925
Roberts Model H	I1	1.5 hp @ 750 RPM - 2 hp @ 900 RPM	3"x2.5"	50 lbs.	1909
Roberts Model 2-H	I2	8 hp @ 1000 RPM	3.75"x4"	163 lbs.	1919-1921
Roberts Model J	I4	8 - 16 hp	3.75"x4"		1922-1926
Roberts Model O	I1	2.5 @ 750 RPM - 3 hp @ 900 RPM	3.5"x3"	95-100 lbs.	1909
Roberts Model 2-O	I2	6 hp @ 900 RPM	3.5"x3"	128-135 lbs.	1911
Roberts Model 3-P	I3	30 hp			
Roberts Model 4-P	I4	40 hp @ 1000 RPM	4.5"x5"	525 lbs.	
Roberts Model 6-P	I6	60 hp			
Roberts Model R	I1	16 - 20 hp	3.78"x4"		1925
Roberts Model S	I1	8 hp @ 300 RPM - 10 hp @ 400 RPM	6"x6.5"	300 lbs.	1917
Roberts Model M	I1	20 hp			
Roberts Model 2-M	I2	10 hp @ 900 RPM	4"x_	240 lbs.	
Roberts Model 3-M	I3	15 hp @ 900 RPM		293 lbs.	
Roberts Model 4-M	I4	20 hp @ 900 RPM		450 lbs.	
Roberts Model 6-Z		100 hp			1925

=== Automobile engines ===
Model name	Power	Bore x Stroke	Weight	Year	Notes
Roberts 6-X	60 hp	4.5"x5"	700 lbs.	1912-1915	racing engine

=== Other ===
Product	Specifications	Weight	Significance	Year
Engine-compressor unit	30 CFM @ 100 PSI	40 lbs.	Progenitor portable air compressor	1910

== Significance ==
The Roberts engines were designed to be as lightweight as possible by using Germany-imported aluminum and magnesium alloys for the cylinders, pistons, and crankshaft, an alloy which the company called 'aerolite,' as well as a hollow crankshaft. All the Roberts engines operated on a two-stroke cycle for parts reduction and thus lighter weight, though four-stroke cycle engines were introduced after WWI. Despite being two-cycle, they were known for never backfiring due to a cellular by-pass in the crankcase designed by E. W. Roberts.

Some of the Roberts engines were used by prominent exhibition pilots, including Tom Benoist, Willie Haupt, Joseph Richter, Clifton Hadley, and Weldon Cooke.

Engine model	Power	Roberts engines in early aviation history	Date
Roberts 4-X	50 hp	Powered one of the first Bleroit XI aircraft built in the United States.	1911
Roberts 4-X	50 hp	Powered the aircraft built by the first South Dakotan pilot, Saxe Pitts Gantz.	March 9, 1911
Roberts 6-X	50 hp	Powered the Ecker Flying Boat which is on display at the Smithsonian Institution.	1911-1912
Roberts 6-X	75 hp	Powered a Benoist biplane used in the first parachute jump from an aircraft, performed by Captain Bert Berry and piloted by Anthony Jannus in St. Louis, Missouri.	March 12, 1912
Roberts 6-X	75 hp	Powered the Benoist Type XIV during the first commercial passenger airplane flight, flown by Jannus, in St. Petersburg, Florida.	January 1, 1914

== Gallery ==
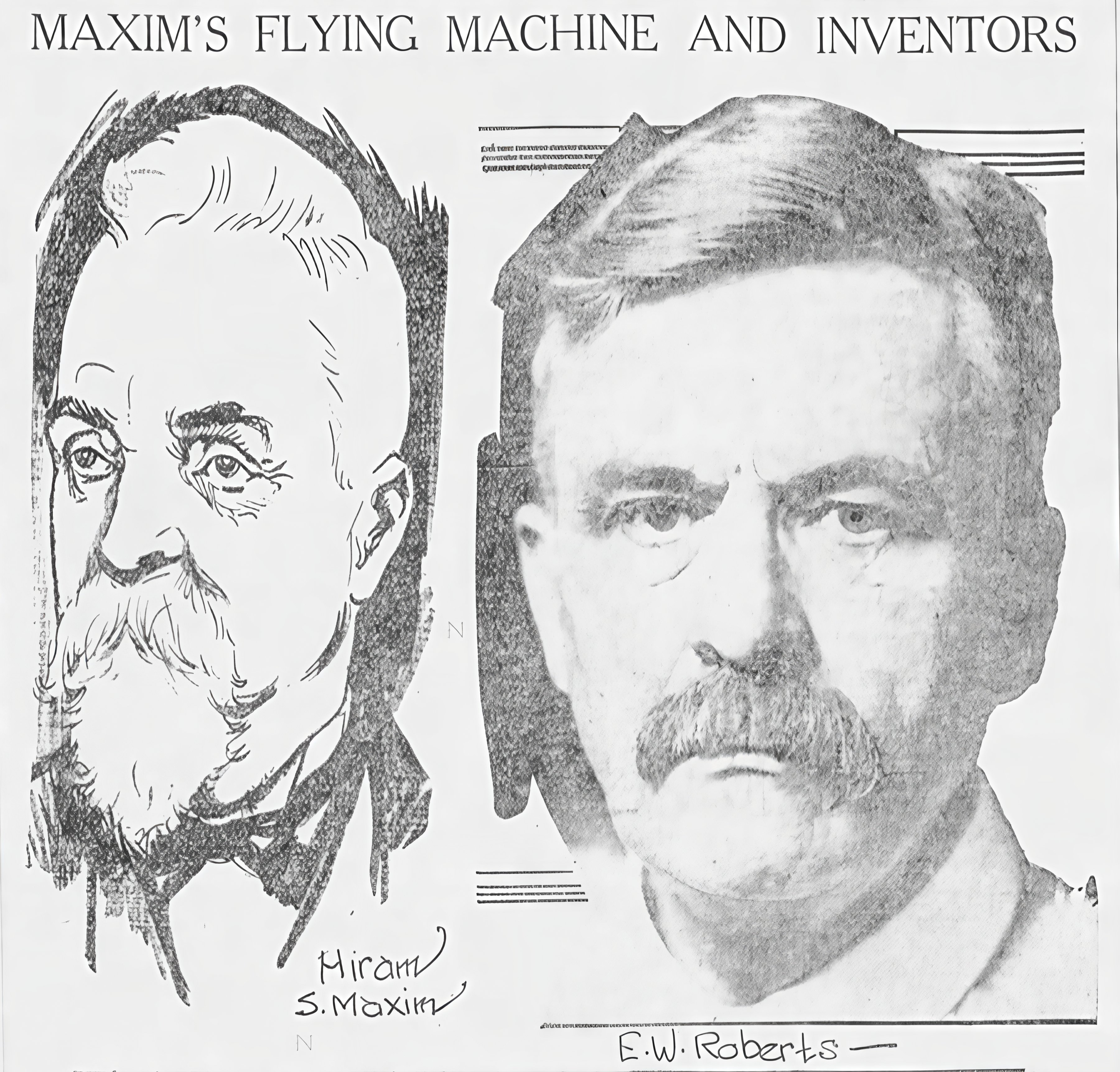
E. W. Roberts (right), founder of Roberts Motor Co., once chief assistant to flying machine inventor, Hiram S. Maxim (left)

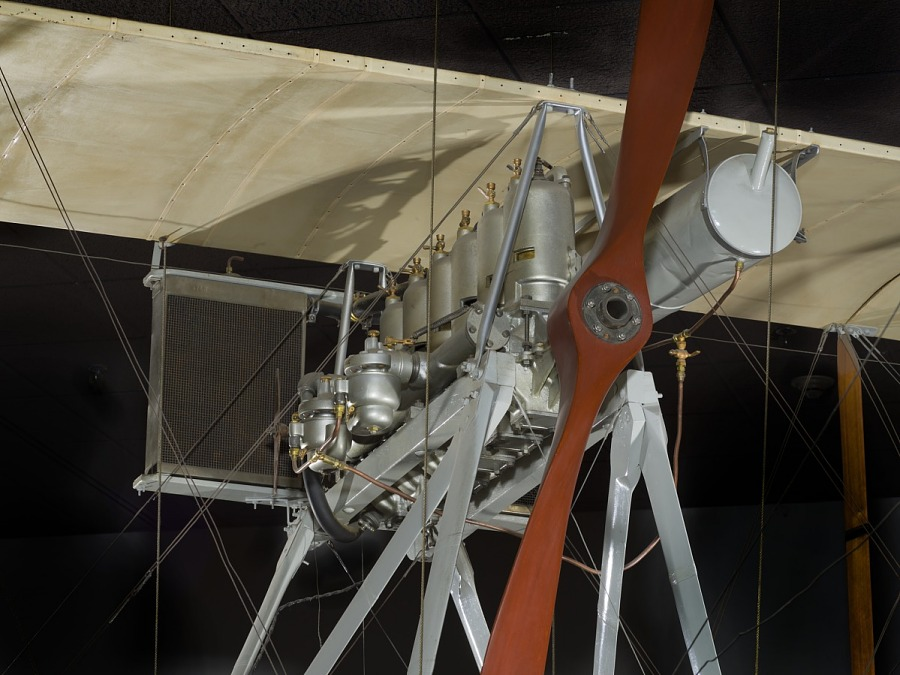
Roberts Engine for Ecker Flying Boat –1911

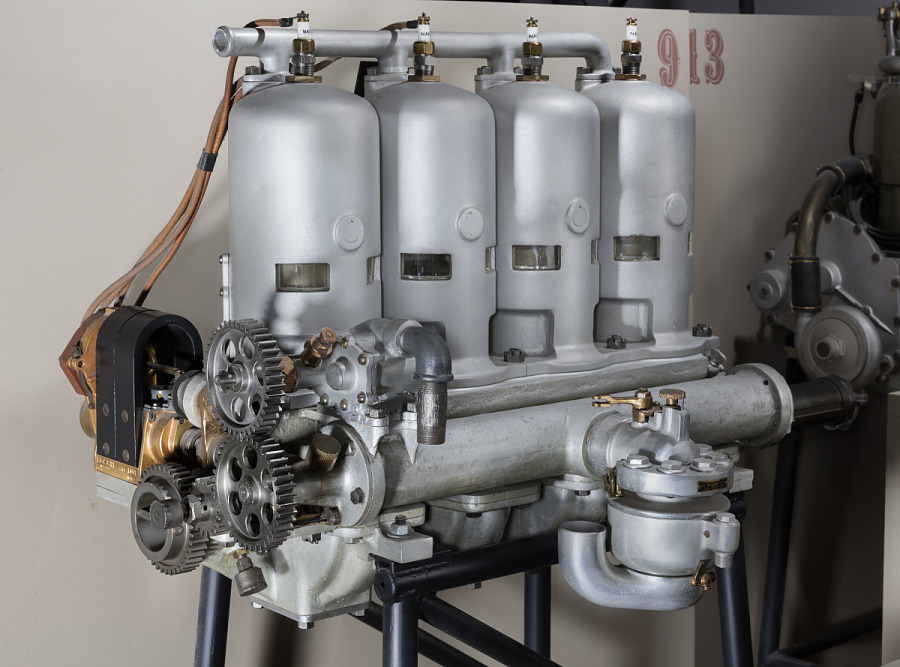
Roberts Hydroplane Engine – 1911

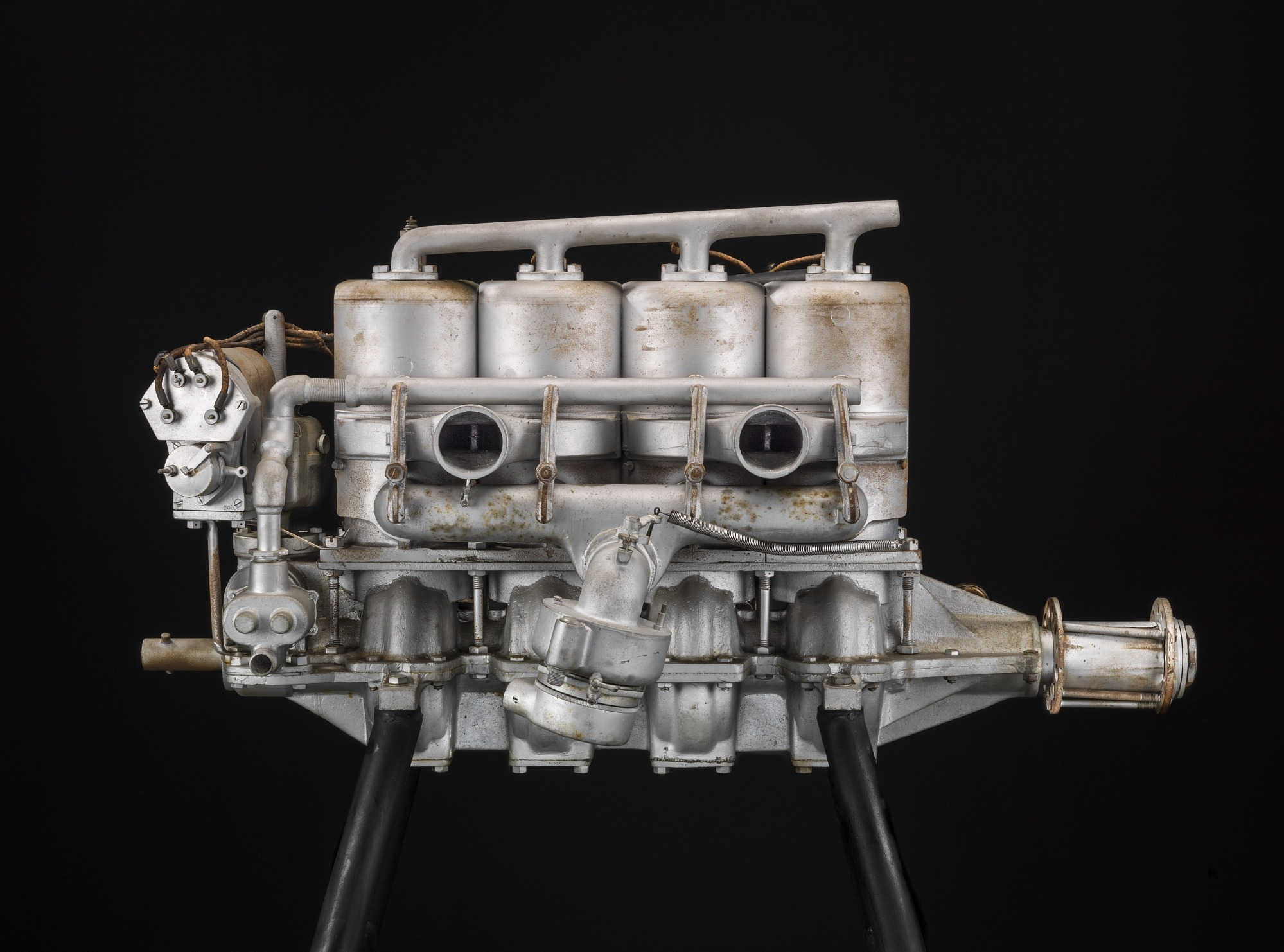
Engine used by Oscar R. Solbrig to power a Curtiss-type pusher aircraft he built in 1911-12.

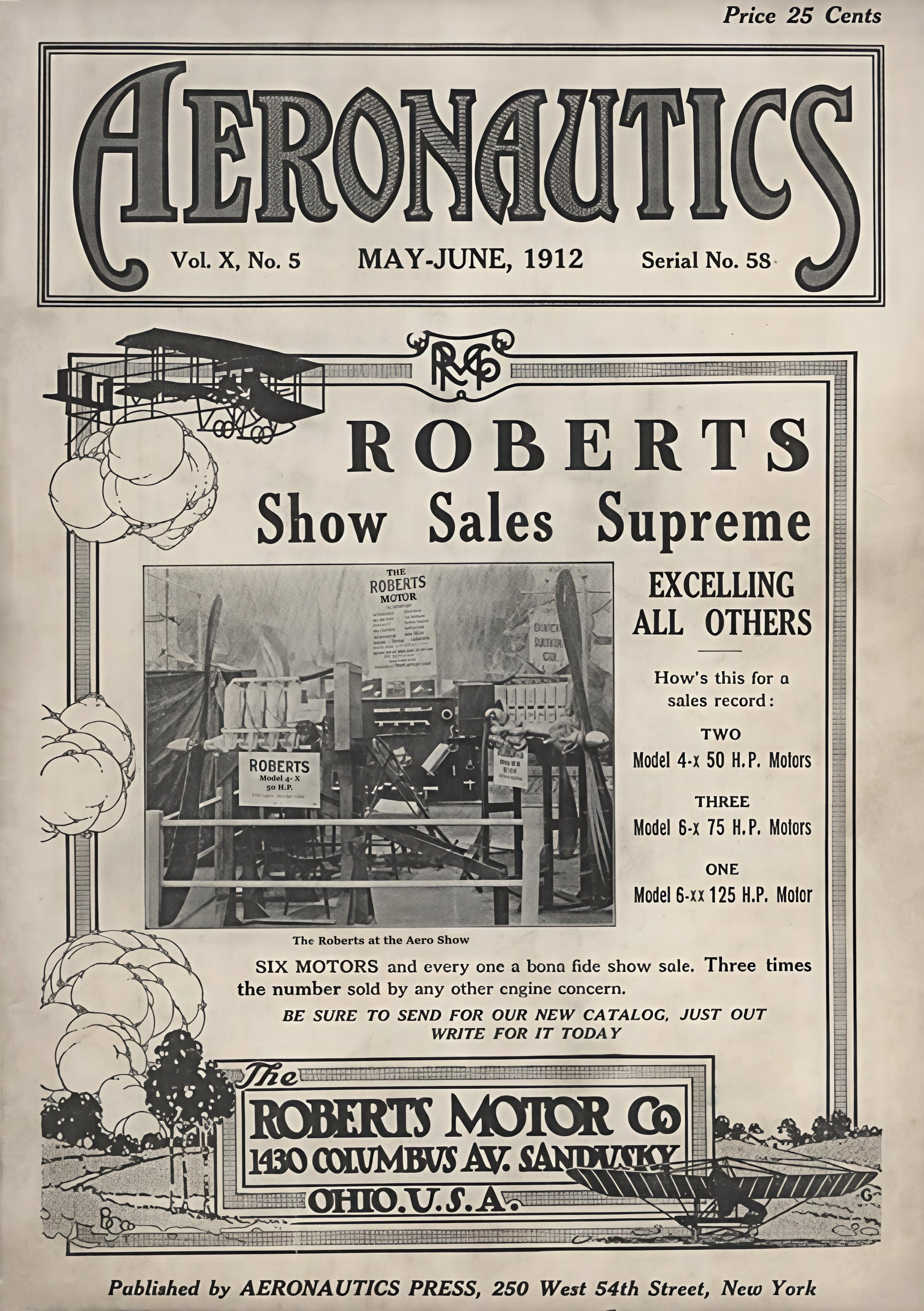
Roberts Motor Co. at the May 1912 New York Air Show

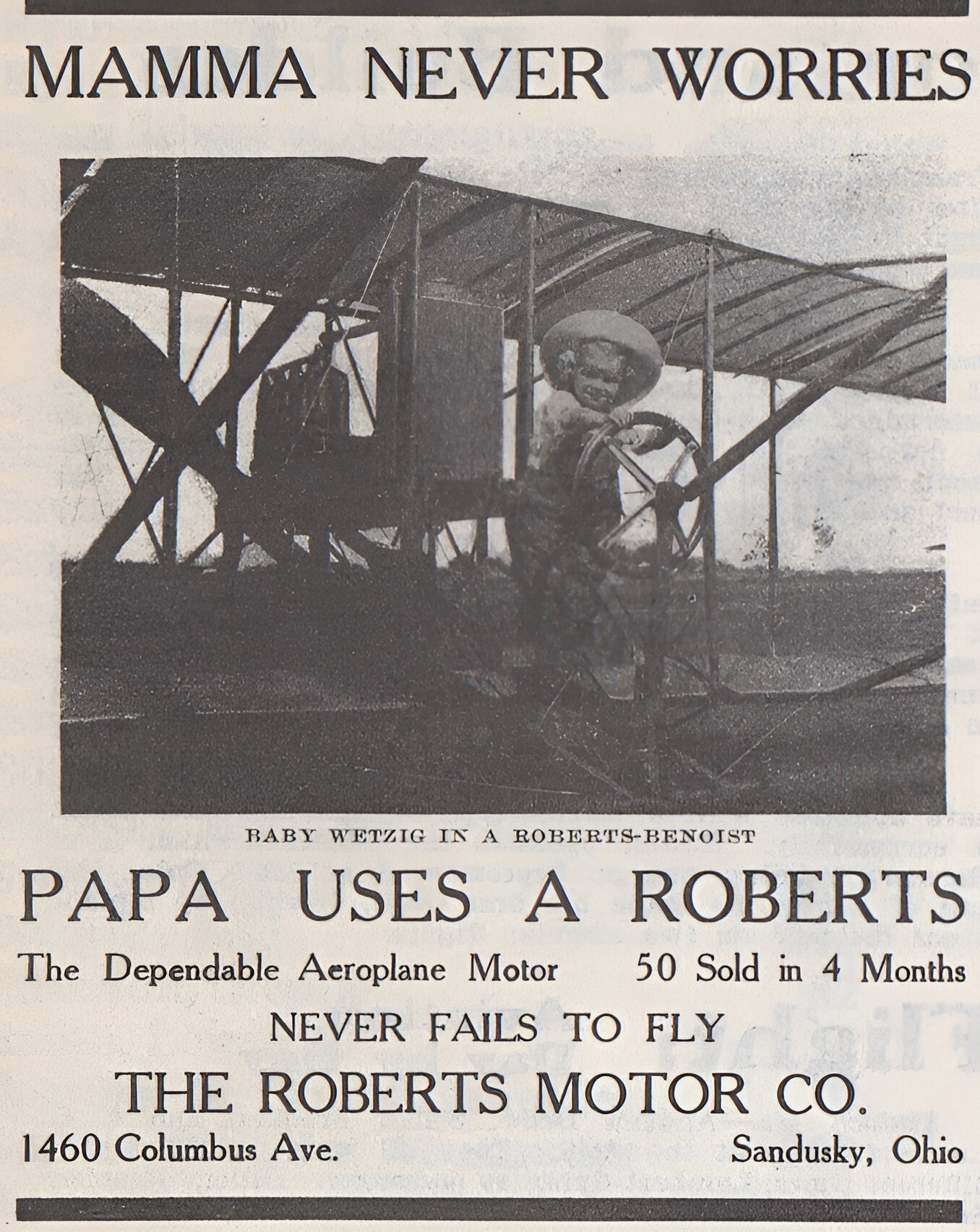
Roberts Motor Company - Advertisement

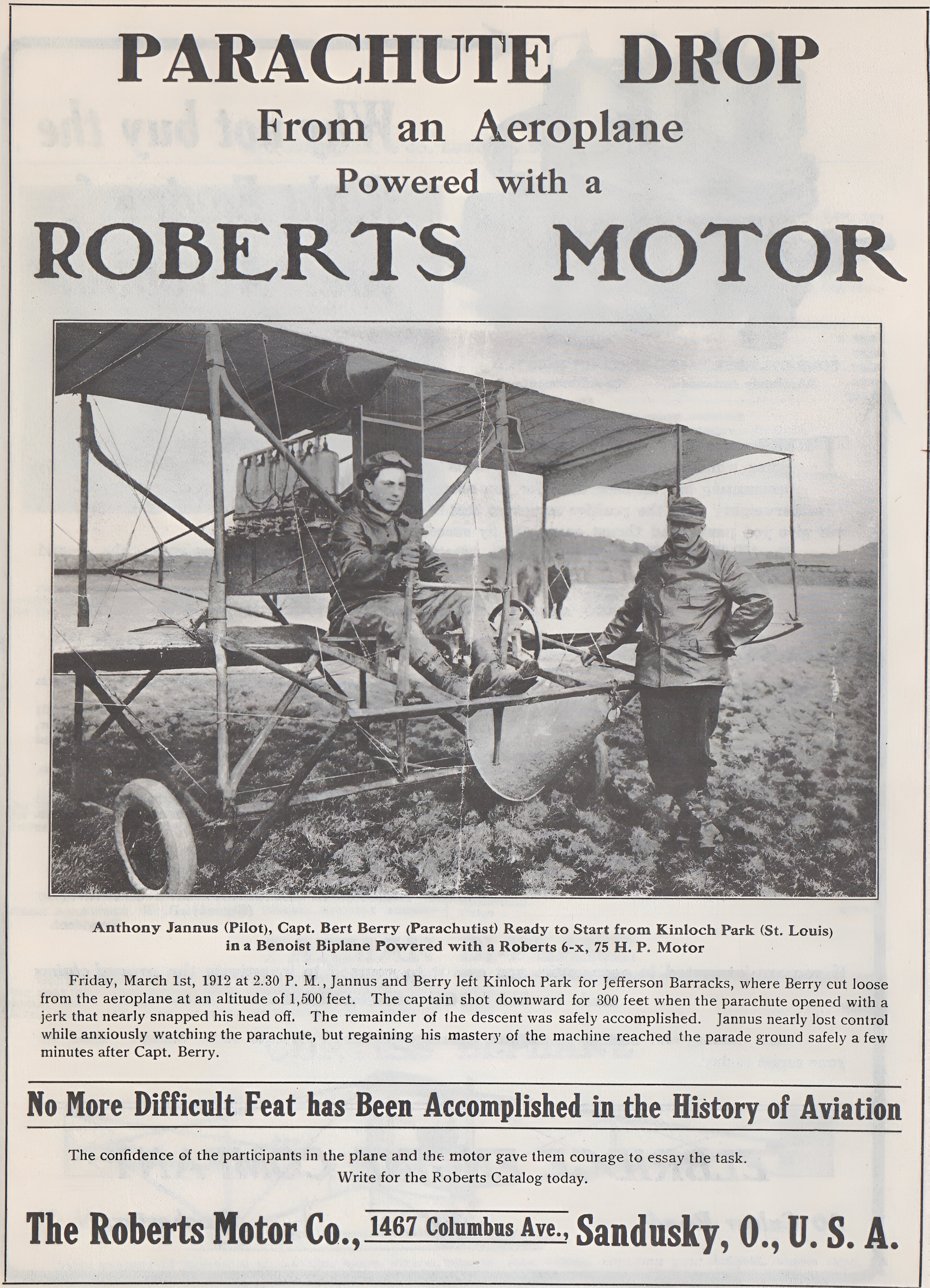
Roberts Motor Company: Parachute Achievement Advertisement
