= Ecker Flying Boat =

Early American-built amphibious biplane

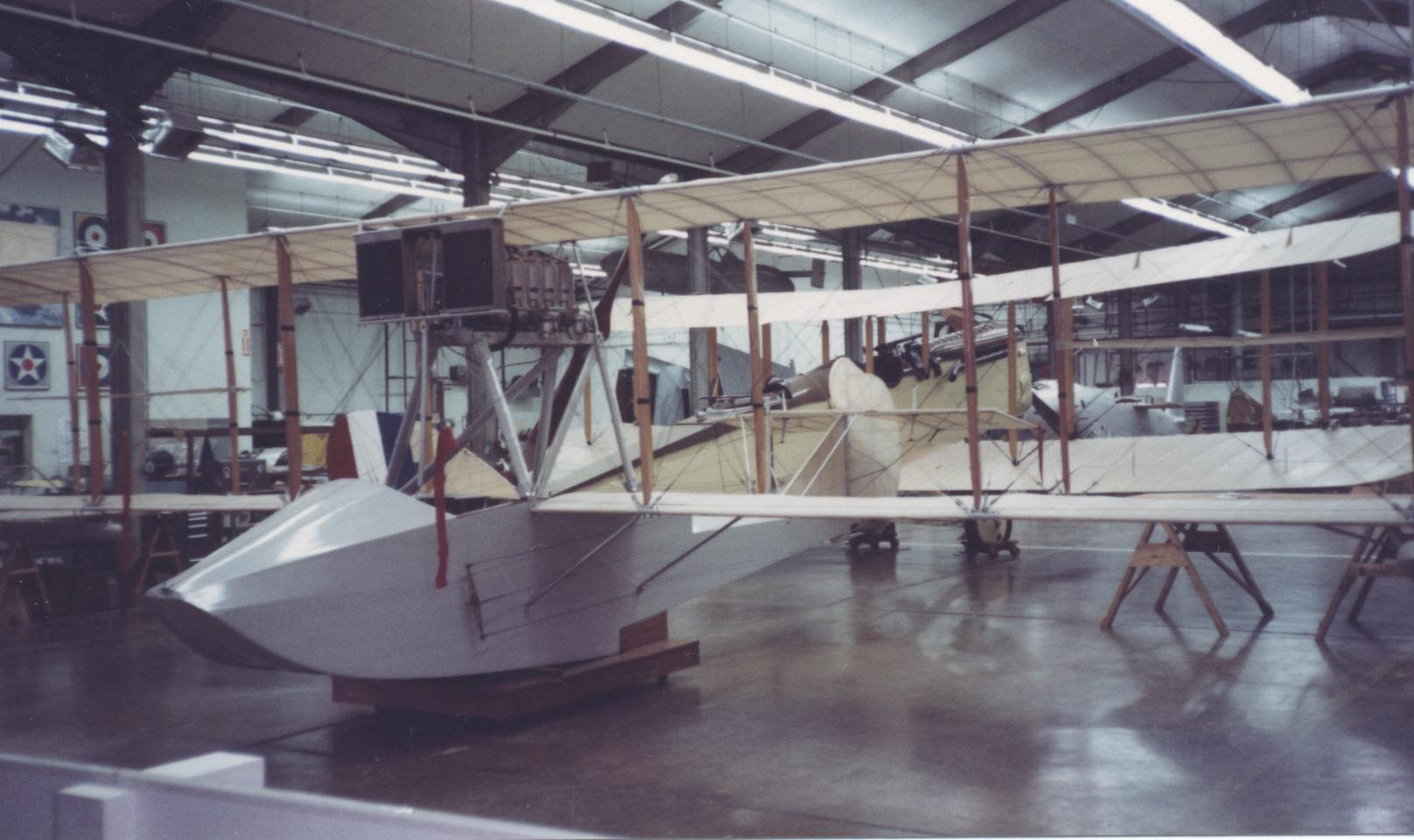
- The Ecker Flying Boat displayed at the NASM Silver Hill, Maryland, restoration facility in June 1982

General information
- Type: Amphibian aircraft
- National origin: United States
- Manufacturer: Herman Anthony Ecker
- Designer: Herman Anthony Ecker
- Status: Preserved in museum
- Number built: 1

History
- Introduction date: 1912
- Retired: 1915
- Developed from: Curtiss Owl

The Ecker Flying Boat is an early American-built amphibious biplane.

== Development ==
Herman Anthony Ecker of Syracuse, New York, designed and built a single-seat open-cockpit biplane in 1911. The following year, Ecker designed a two-seat open-cockpit biplane which he described at the time as a flying boat, although as it was fitted with wheels in the lower fuselage, it was technically an amphibian. The 1912 aircraft was based on the design of the Curtiss Owl and utilised an all-wooden construction with muslin covering on the fuselage and wings, and powered with a Roberts 6-X engine.

== Operational history ==
Ecker flew the aircraft for three years before disassembling it for storage. It was reassembled in 1930 for exhibition at the New York State Fair. It was later acquired by the Smithsonian Institution as a static exhibit. After display at the Silver Hill, Maryland NASM restoration facility, it is currently exhibited at the National Air and Space Museum in central Washington DC.

== Specifications (variant) ==
Data from Aerofiles.com

General characteristics

- Crew: one
- Capacity: one passenger
- Length: 26 ft 0 in (7.92 m)
- Wingspan: 42 ft 0 in (12.80 m)
- Powerplant: 1 × Roberts 6-X marine engine , 50 hp (37 kW)

Performance

- Endurance: 20-30 minutes
