= Benoist XIV =

Flying boat built in 1913

XIV
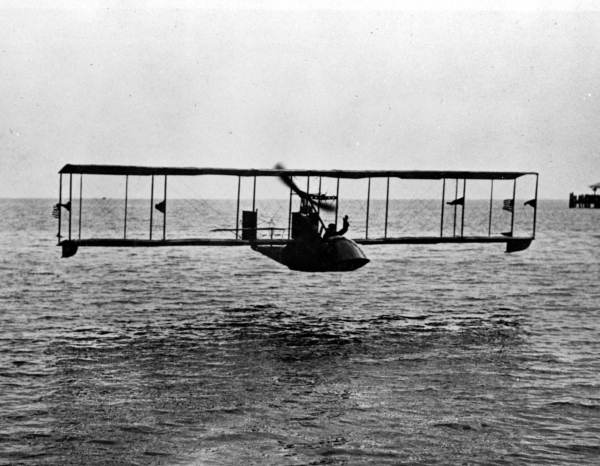
- A Benoist XIV over Tampa Bay in Florida in 1914.

General information
- Type: Airliner
- Manufacturer: Benoist
- Designer: Thomas W. Benoist
- Primary user: St. Petersburg–Tampa Airboat Line, Exhibitions across America
- Number built: 5+

History
- Introduction date: 1913
- First flight: 1913
- Retired: 1914

The Benoist XIV flying boats became famous for their role in flying the first-ever heavier-than-air scheduled airline service anywhere in the world. For more information on the airline's establishment and operation, refer to St. Petersburg–Tampa Airboat Line. In addition, some Benoist XIV flying boats were privately owned and toured America, putting on exhibitions and/or carrying passengers for joyrides.

== Design and development ==
The aircraft was a conventional biplane with equal-span unstaggered wings with small pontoons at their tips. The engine was mounted on a pedestal aft of the cockpit and drove a two-blade pusher propeller. Various Benoist XIV models supported from one person to three people, sitting side by side in an open cockpit.

== The Original The Lark of Duluth ==
The Lark of Duluth was a privately owned Benoist XIII aircraft. In 1943, Julius H. Barnes wrote that he was the original owner, but because he was the world’s largest wheat exporter, the local bank advised him in no uncertain terms not to fly. The ownership was thus quickly transferred, on an unknown date, to his friend William D. Jones, both men being from Duluth, Minnesota.

The Lark of Duluth arrived in Duluth on June 24, 1913, along with Benoist pilot Hugh Robinson. She had a sea-green hull and 35-foot white wings painted with the plane’s name. She was scheduled to fly during Duluth's Lark o' the Lake festival, before leaving for Chicago to participate in the 900-mile Great Lakes Reliability Cruise, which started on July 8, 1913. The Great Lakes Reliability Cruise entry list appears to reflect she had a 75-horsepower Roberts motor and would be flown by Hugh Robinson.

But on her maiden flight on July 5, 1913, with Hugh Robinson at the controls, she "was caught by a gust of wind and turned turtle plunging into the lake with Aviator Hugh Robinson and his mechanician, before a gallery of nearly 1,000 persons gathered at the Duluth Boat Club to watch the maneuvers." The St. Louis Benoist factory quickly shipped another flying boat to continue the Duluth Boat Club exhibition flights. The replacement plane arrived on July 8, 1913, and The Lark of Duluth was sent to the Benoist factory for repairs. (Although the news article does not mention the Benoist Number of the replacement plane, tracking her activity over the next few months, leads to the conclusion that she was Benoist Number 44. In addition, no primary sources were located for The Lark of Duluth’s Benoist Number, though it does stand to reason that she could have been 43, given that her construction was completed 10 days before Number 44. This also highlights that Number 43 and 44 existed at the same time, but were not the same airboat.)

== The Rebuilt The Lark of Duluth ==
As previously mentioned, the original The Lark of Duluth crashed on July 5, 1913 and was sent to the Benoist St. Louis factory for repairs. The exact extent of her repairs, her new specifications, and her arrival date back to her owner, William D. Jones, remain unclear, but she is reported flying on July 24, 1913 in Duluth.

On year later, June 1914 Aero and Hydro publications report "she is a 1913 Benoist Airboat with a six-cylinder Sturtevant, 70-80-horsepower motor and is the property of W. D. Jones of this city. After nearly a week's work by Jones and [Roger] Jannus the boat is in pink of condition and looks as fresh in her new coats of paint as the day she left the Benoist shops nearly one year ago. The Sturtevant motor ran faultlessly all last summer.... The Lark will be handled during the entire summer by Roger Jannus in the city of Duluth, where he will do a passenger-carrying business, and in the surrounding territory, where he will conduct a general exhibition and passenger service." "The Sturtevant motor worked right on schedule and the hull was still watertight after its long term in the boathouse. The radiator has recently been placed between the front struts of the center section instead of between the rear ones, as before. This gives it a perfectly cool, fresh air, besides improving the balance of the machine, which is now perfect, and eliminating the air disturbance immediately in front of the propeller, which was slightly noticeable last year."

The August 8, 1914 Aero and Hydro publication reports The Lark of Duluth was sold to Roger W. Jannus, who expects to take her to Ohio for exhibitions. By February 1915, Roger Jannus' airboat was flying passengers across the San Diego Bay. On February 19, 1915, the Jannus-owned airboat, while under the control of aviator C. W. Webster crashed into the San Diego Bay. The impact broke several struts and hurled the passenger and pilot, but neither were seriously hurt. "The crew of the Annie Larsen lowered a boat and went to their rescue. They took the aviators ashore and hoisted the machine about the ship and are now holding it for salvage. Roger Jannus, owner of the hydro-aeroplane, tried to obtain a warrant for the arrest of the captain of the schooner. He was unsuccessful, on the ground that the case was under the jurisdiction of the admiralty courts." That's appears to be the end of the rebuilt version of The Lark of Duluth.

== Benoist Number 44 ==
As previously mentioned, on July 5, 1913, Benoist employee Hugh Robinson crashed the privately owned The Lark of Duluth during a Duluth exhibition. The Benoist Company quickly shipped from their St. Louis factory a company-owned airboat to fulfil the exhibition obligations, while The Lark of Duluth was sent to the factory for repairs. The replacement plane [Benoist Number 44] arrived on July 8, 1913. Later reports claim Benoist Number 44 was built in 3 days, which has some merit based on her rush from the factory to Duluth. However, the only way an airboat could be constructed that quickly was by assembling it from an existing hull, wings, and tail assembly. (Although the news article does not mention the Benoist Number of the replacement plane, tracking her activity over the next few months, leads to the conclusion that she was Benoist Number 44. In addition, no primary sources were located for The Lark of Duluth’s Benoist Number, though it does stand to reason that she could have been 43, given that her construction was completed 10 days before Number 44. This also highlights that Number 43 and 44 existed at the same time, but were not the same airboat.)

After having arrived in Duluth, Minnesota on July 8, 1913, she spent the rest of the year in various towns across the country, ending up in Paducah, Kentucky in December 1913, where she was described as having a 75hp, 6-cylinder aluminum 2-cycle engine weighing 290 pounds, 60-foot wings at the present time (rather than the normal 50-foot wings) & 5-feet wider than necessary to support the load of people and baggage, a price tag of $5,000, an engine costing $1,500, a weight of 1,175 pounds, and durable vulcanized rubber silk material (versus the delicate material typically used) covered wings with the names of 3,700 people who had seen her across the county. She was said to have an 80mph capability with a 70mph average. On December 22, 1913, the green-hulled Benoist flying boat was crated along the Paducah, Kentucky, river front for shipment via rail to St. Petersburg, Florida where she was to open a daily scheduled flight across Tampa Bay.

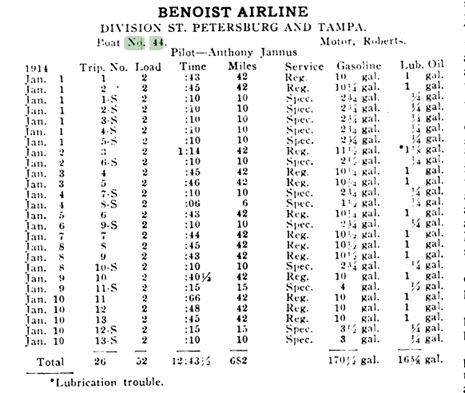
Benoist No. 44 flights during January 1-10, 1914 for the St. Petersburg–Tampa route.

The St. Petersburg, Florida news article on January 7, 1914 states, "...Benoist Number 44, which is the one in use here ... has already run over 7,000 miles and is now doing another hundred miles a day."

In May 1914, after the contractual obligations for the St. Petersburg–Tampa route were satisfied with no significant mishaps, Mr. L. E. McLain, of St. Petersburg, "bought Benoist Airboat No. 44 from the Benoist Aircraft company of St. Louis. This boat is the one that opened the airboat line for Tampa...." At the same time, Mr. McLain signed a contract with the Conneaut Lake (PA) Exposition Park owners to run flights between the park and the borough from June through August.

On Sunday, June 28, 1914, Benoist Number 44 crashed into Conneaut Lake. Aviator Bird M. Latham and his passenger were not injured, but the plane was damaged beyond repair. "The only thing saved was the engine," and work began on building another airboat (this one was christened Florida).

== Benoist Number 43 and 44 Conflation Confusion ==
Benoist Number 43 and 44 are often conflated. (As previously mentioned, no primary sources were located for The Lark of Duluth’s Benoist Number, though it does stand to reason that she could have been 43, given that her construction was completed 10 days before Number 44.)

Nearly sixteen years after Benoist Number 44 made her historic first-ever heavier-than-air daily scheduled flights over Tampa Bay, Percival Fansler (1881–1937), a promoter of the St. Petersburg–Tampa route, wrote an article about his memories for Aero Digest. For the most part, his memories were accurate, but some details were off by one day (the airboat’s arrival date in Florida) and by one number (the airboat’s number). His inaccurate statement that the St. Petersburg–Tampa route flying boat was Benoist Number 43 is still being repeated in twenty-first-century articles, books, and in museums across the country.

In addition, at least one book when quoting newspaper articles, such as, "We'll be taking No. 44 to Conneaut Lake..." changed the text to "We'll be taking No. 43 to Conneaut Lake," without a [sic] or [recte] notation, and then throughout the book retained the 43 number. These changes of Benoist Numbers have most likely been carried forward into additional twenty and twenty-first century publications, unless it was fact-checked against a primary source.

Thomas Reilly in his book Jannus, An American Flyer highlights "over the years, many conflicting accounts have arisen in regard to the St. Petersburg-Tampa Airboat Line.... Many individuals involved with the airline, even though only on a peripheral basis, attempted to claim credit for themselves.... Ownership of the airline and the flying boats used by the St. Petersburg-Tampa Airboat Line has also been disputed...." He then goes on to state, "The flying boat, Benoist Number 43, was owned by Julius H. Barnes of Duluth, Minnesota." However, as mentioned earlier, in 1943, Julius H. Barnes wrote that he was the original owner, but because he was the world’s largest wheat exporter, the local bank advised him in no uncertain terms not to fly. And then Mr. Barnes continued with, "As fall approached that year [1913], the Jannus brothers came to me with a proposition. They would like to take the 'Lark' down to Florida and set up a flying service." Although Mr. Reilly disputed countless other claims, this time, for unstated reasons, he appeared to accept Barnes' claim. But, with the benefit of numerous 1913–1914 newspaper articles and Aero and Hydro publications, we can now see flaws with Barnes' claim, provided he really did mean to imply the privately owned The Lark of Duluth opened the St. Petersburg-Tampa Airline route. These flaws include: (1) Per a June 1914 Aero and Hydro publication, The Lark of Duluth spent her 1913-1914 winter in her Duluth boathouse. The article states in June 1914, after "its long [winter] term in the boathouse," The Lark of Duluth's "Sturtevant motor worked right on schedule and the hull was still watertight." So The Lark of Duluth did not spent January-March 1914 flying in Florida. (2) The June 1914 Aero and Hydro article also states The Lark of Duluth had a Sturtevant motor. The Benoist airboats running the St. Petersburg-Tampa Airline route had Roberts motors. (3) The airboats that flew the St. Petersburg-Tampa Airline route were Benoist Company owned, not privately owned. And their numbers were No. 44 and No. 45, not 43, as The Lark of Duluth was said to be.

Another source of possible confusion is caused by the January 1, 1914 image of Number 44 running the first St. Petersburg–Tampa flight. In this image, the letters “OF DU” (remnants of “The Lark of Duluth” wording) are visible on the underside of her upper wing. As previously stated, Number 44's wings were swapped out depending on carrying load requirements. Just before her arrival to St. Petersburg, she was in Paducah, Kentucky, with her larger 60-foot wings. For her January 1, 1914 opening of the airline, she had shorter wings; a section of which at one time belonged to The Lark of Duluth. Remember, the Benoist factory assembled Number 44 in 3 days to replace the The Lark of Duluth that was crashed by their company pilot, so the private owner would have a plane to use while The Lark of Duluth was rebuilt. This means, The Lark of Duluth and Number 44 were not the same airboat – they co-existed in time. But, there were times when Number 44 was using a section of The Lark of Duluth's wings. Perhaps the rebuilt The Lark of Duluth received completely new wings (which would make sense, since a Benoist employee damaged them) and fragments of The Lark of Duluth's damaged wings remained in the Benoist factory for usage on company-owned airboats as desired.

With the reliance on primary sources, in this case, numerous 1913–1914 newspaper articles and Aero and Hydro publications, the unraveling of the Benoist Number 43 and 44 conflation confusion is accomplished.

== Benoist Number 45 ==
On January 30, 1914, Benoist Number 45 arrived from the St. Louis factory to St. Petersburg to help with the daily Tampa Bay flights. An Aero and Hydro article, quoting a February 6, 1914 news release, states that the "new Benoist airboat No. 45" was "about the same as the previous models but with several refinements and a new wing that has demonstrated much greater efficiency over the old one. It created much surprise around the aero camp when [Antony 'Tony'] Jannus got ready to make his regular trip to Tampa after trying out the machine, and announced that he would take two passengers instead of one. Two passengers were quickly loaded in and Jannus had no trouble at all in getting these out of the water.... It is equipped with a 75-horsepower Roberts motor.... The No. 45 has much cleaner lines than the older plane; motor much more accessible; chain guards and back part of the motor exposed making it much more efficient for the radiation of heat, while the hood has a new curve which eliminates a lot of spray and the strong wind that blows in the passengers' faces while in the old boat. It has a spread of 42 feet, a gap of 6 feet and a cord of 5 feet 2 inches. The complete machine ready for flight, tanks empty, weighs 1,250 pounds."

The February 14, 1914 Aero and Hydro article clarified how the "new three passenger boat" would be used: "Roger Jannus, brother of Tony Jannus, with Weldon B. Cooke, is preparing to take charge of the St. Petersburg-Tampa Line [using the older Number 44], while Tony Jannus will use a new three passenger boat [Number 45] for exhibition and special passenger work."

By June 1914, Antony Jannus was in Sandusky, Ohio. His Aero and Hydro advertisement states, "AN'TONY' JANNUS 3-Passenger Airboat Exhibition Flying; Passenger-Carrying a Specialty." Based on the September 1914, Aero and Hydro's Classified Advertising Section describing this airboat, she would be Benoist Number 45.

In September 1914, having wrapped up his successful season at Cedar Point, Sandusky, Ohio, Antony Jannus listed his airboat for sale in Aero and Hydro's Classified Advertising Section: "Tony Jannus' Famous St. Petersburg-Tampa ferryboat. Useful load 500 pounds. Needs overhauling. $700 without motor. $1,700 with motor; $2,000 rebuilt completely fitted, extras, marine complement, performance guaranteed. 1405 Columbus Ave., Sandusky, O." It was still listed for sale in the November 14, 1914 Aero and Hydro issue.

== Jannus Brothers Race Benoist Number 44 and 45 ==
It was not all work and no play in St. Petersburg. "On April 27 [1914], [Antony 'Tony'] Jannus and his brother Roger, another of the newly developed air-boatmen of the Benoist school, indulged in a series of races over an eight-mile course. Roger Jannus used the new model 45 boat (75 horse-power Roberts motor, Benoist propeller), while 'Tony' piloted old No. 44. The course was four miles out and return, the race out to begin with a flying start, the winner out to be the pilot who completed this leg of the trip in the fastest time. The slowest time for the return was to determine the winner of the second leg. The time out was three minutes 20 seconds for Roger Jannus, who led his brother by 12 seconds. The time back was six minutes 18 seconds, won by Antony Jannus, his time being slightly over 28 seconds slower."

== One-Person Benoist Training Airboat ==
On January 30, 1914, along with Benoist Number 45, a one-person Benoist airboat arrived from the St. Louis factory to St. Petersburg for the Benoist Aviation School usage. "The smaller airboat is a design which was used last year by the Benoist company. The seating capacity only allows room for the pilot. The engine and motor set up high in the boat and the six cylinders are exposed in plain view. It is slightly smaller throughout than the first airboat brought here [Number 44]." No Benoist Number was provided in the article for the one-person training airboat, but it does stand to reason that it could have been Number 46.

== Florida Airboat ==
After Benoist Number 44 crashed into Conneaut Lake on June 28, 1914, the Conneaut Lake aviation team of L.E. McLain and aviator Bird M. Latham, sought the help of German Captain Heinrich Evers to build a new airboat. (Upon the German Army Aviation Corps hearing of the St. Petersburg–Tampa route opening with the usage of flying boats, they sent Captain Evers, a licensed German Army Aviation Corps pilot and member of the technical department, to St. Petersburg to attend Benoist airboat flight school and learn everything he could about their construction. He arrived in late January 1914.) Under the guidance of Captain Evers, who had designed over 18 aircraft for his country and had been working for numerous months on crafting airboat design plans, construction began on a new airboat. With just the engine (and perhaps some of the wings) salvageable from Benoist Number 44, Meadville’s (PA) Smith Lumber Company was called upon to build a 27.5-foot spruce hull with a Mexican mahogany nose. Once completed, the Evers-designed airboat weighed 1,100 pounds, about 150 pounds lighter than Number 44 and reportedly with about 20 percent greater flying ability and 75 percent greater strength. With 45-foot wings, 1 mile of copper wire wrapping the cables, and 9,000 brass screws, she was christened Florida on Friday, July 24, 1914 at Conneaut Lake, PA, taking just 20 working days to build.

Upon conclusion of his 1914 summer contractual obligations at Conneaut Lake, PA, L.E. McLain and his airboat Florida returned to Florida. In January 1915, under the guidance of Antony Jannus and his mechanic Harry Rau (of Baltimore, MD), Florida was overhauled and reconstructed, including a new hull from the Benoist factory. The motor was not replaced. McLain planned to operate Florida on "no set route; the course of the trip being wholly optional with the passengers," with a charge of a dollar per mile. Although Florida could carry two passengers in addition to the pilot, "as a rule, only one person will be taken at a time."

On February 25, 1915, Antony Jannus crashed Florida into Tampa Bay. Although originally thought to be damaged beyond repair, Florida was entirely rebuilt, retaining only the engine. Her April 28, 1915 maiden test flight was successful and Florida was deemed ready to carry paying passengers the following day.

By November 1915, L.E. McLain was activity seeking a buyer for Florida and had an interested party – Harry Johnson of Atlantic City, who planned to equip her with a 180-horsepower motor. That sale must have fallen though, as Florida was still advertised for sale one year later. The airboat was said to be "a good one and is in good condition but has been stored for a long time as Mr. McLain had difficulty finding a careful aviator to handle it for him." In addition, with the airboat having ties to Antony Jannus, who had recently died in a plane crash in Russia, Florida was deemed historically "valuable."

== Replicas ==
- In 1984, a full-scale flying replica was constructed by Florida Aviation Historical Society for the 70th anniversary of the flight. This aircraft is now on loan to the St. Petersburg Museum of History in St. Petersburg, Florida.
- A second replica of the 1913 Lark of Duluth was constructed by the Duluth Aviation Institute and FAA certified to commemorate the 100th anniversary of commercial aviation. It is now on display at the EAA Aviation Museum, Oshkosh, Wisconsin.
- A full-scale replica of the Model XIV was built by Kermit Weeks at Fantasy of Flight and was tested at a lake there but never left the water. Vintage and Auto Rebuilds of Chardon, OH were commissioned to reverse engineer an original Roberts engine on loan from the St. Petersburg Museum of History. The aircraft was brought to St. Petersburg to display for the centennial of Tony Jannus' first scheduled commercial flight on January 1, 2014. Today the replica aircraft resides at Fantasy of Flight.

== Operators ==
United States

- St. Petersburg–Tampa Airboat Line

== Specifications ==
General characteristics

- Crew: one pilot
- Capacity: 1 passenger
- Length: 26 ft 0 in (7.93 m)
- Wingspan: 44 ft 0 in (13.41 m)
- Empty weight: 1,250 lb (567 kg)
- Powerplant: 1 × Roberts straight-6 , 75 hp (56 kW)

Performance

- Maximum speed: 64 mph (103 km/h, 56 kn)
- Range: 125 mi (200 km, 109 nmi)

== Gallery ==
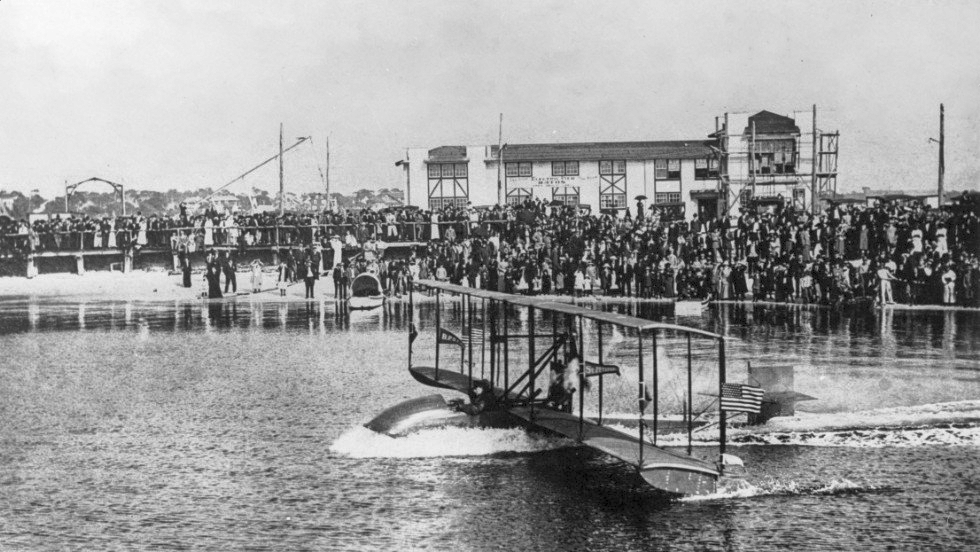
A St. Petersburg–Tampa Airboat Line Benoist XIV begins its takeoff run on Tampa Bay for history's first scheduled airline flight, January 1, 1914.

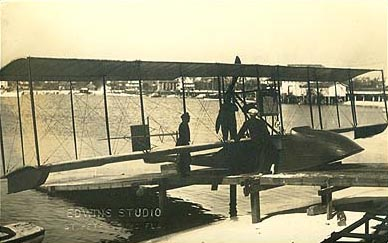
A Benoist XIV being launched into Tampa Bay by the St. Petersburg-Tampa Airboat Line.

Tony Jannus taxis a Benoist XIV at Cedar Point, Ohio, in 1914.

== See also ==
- Pusher aircraft
- St. Petersburg–Tampa Airboat Line
