= Benoist Land Tractor Type XII =

Early 20th-century airplane

Land Tractor Type XII
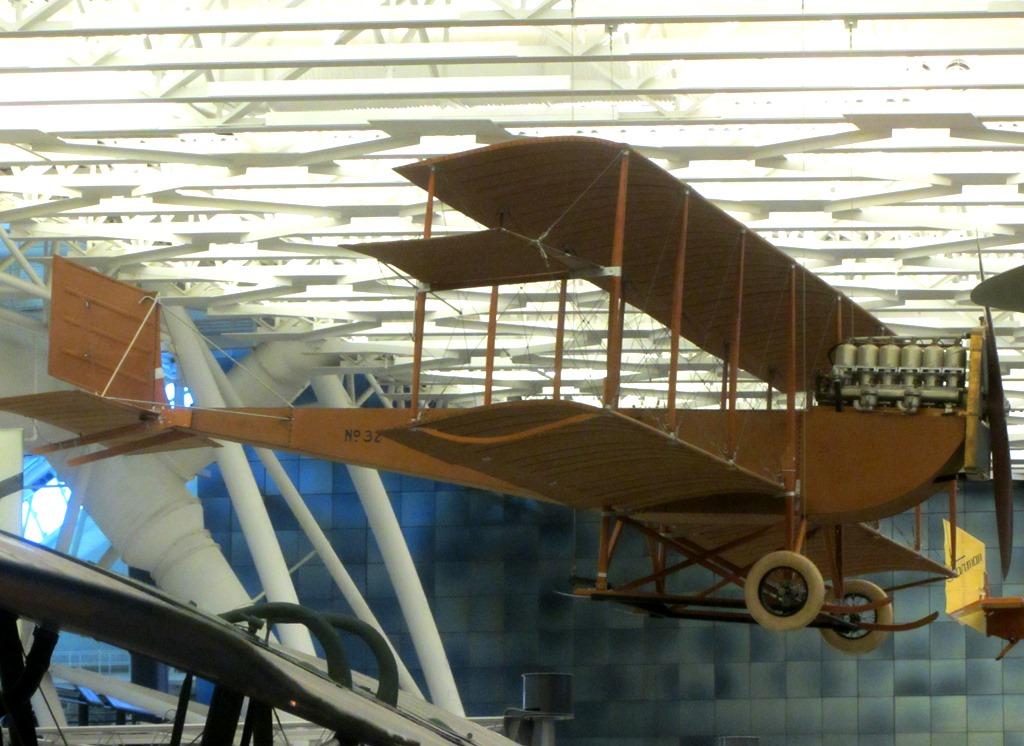
- A Benoist Land Tractor Type XII on display at the Steven F. Udvar-Hazy Center of the Smithsonian's National Air and Space Museum.

General information
- Type: Biplane
- National origin: United States of America
- Manufacturer: Benoist Aircraft Company
- Designer: Thomas W. Benoist, Tony Jannus
- Number built: 5

History
- Manufactured: 1912
- Introduction date: 1912
- Developed from: Benoist Type XII headless

The Benoist Land Tractor Type XII was one of the first enclosed cockpit, tractor configuration aircraft built. Benoist used "Model XII" to several aircraft that shared the same basic engine and wing design, but differed in fuselage and control surfaces.

== Design and development ==
The Type XII was a tractor-engined conversion of the model XII headless pusher aircraft that resembled the Curtiss pusher aircraft. Demonstration pilots used Benoist aircraft to demonstrate the first parachute jumps, and the tractor configuration was considered much more suitable for the task. The first example named the "Military Plane" had a small box frame covered fuselage that left the occupants mostly exposed to the wind. The later model XII "Cross Country Plane" had a full fuselage that occupants sat inside of.

The first tractor biplane used a wooden fuselage with a small seat on top. The wings were covered with a Goodyear rubberized cloth.

== Operational history ==
The first model XII was built in the spring of 1912.

On 1 March 1912, Albert Berry used a headless Type XII to complete the first parachute jump from an airplane. Berry used a conical parachute with paper in between the folds to prevent entanglement. He climbed onto a trapeze like support on the front of the aircraft, cut the supporting cable and landed at Jefferson Barracks.

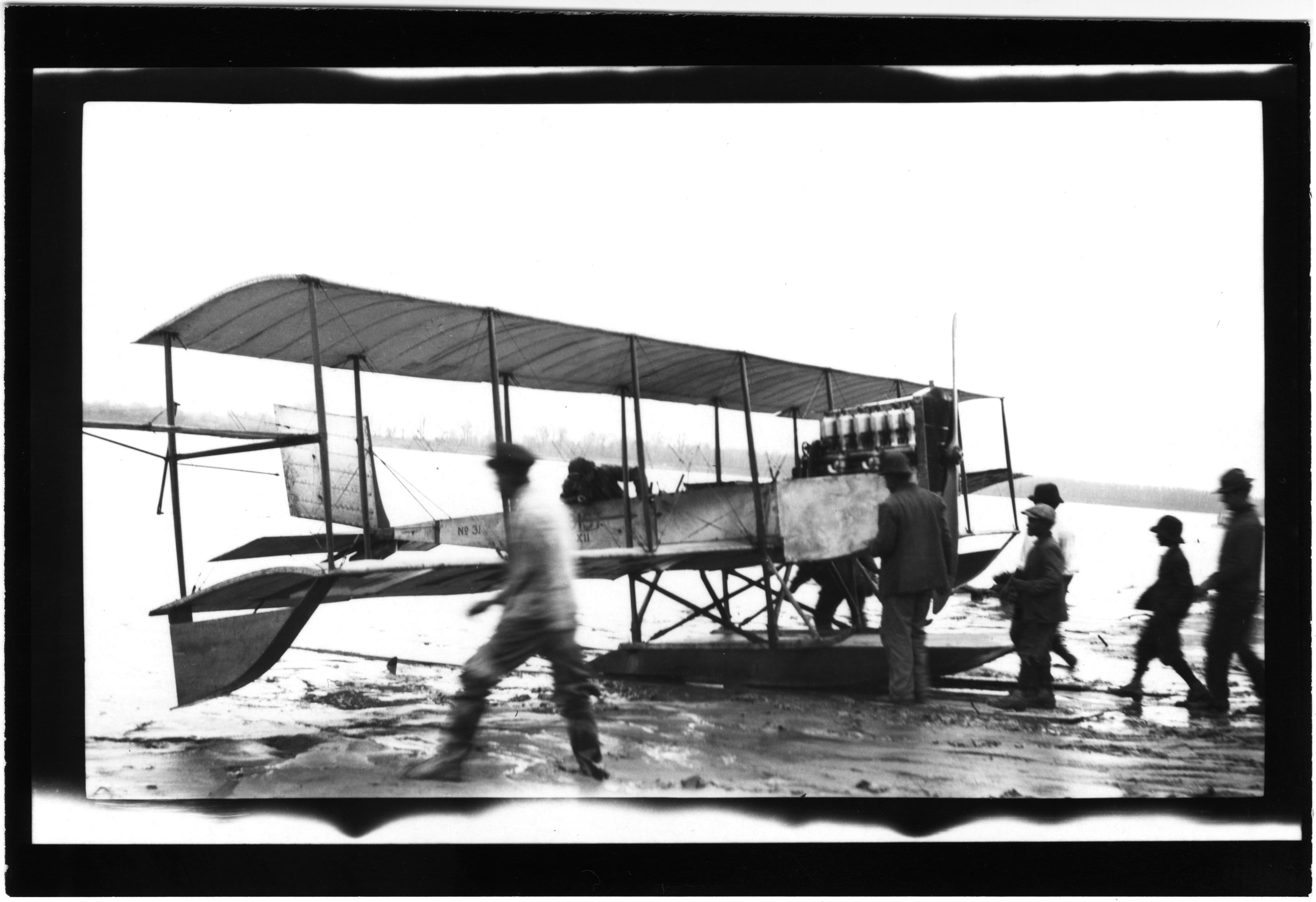
A scene during exhibition flights along the Mississippi

On 6 November 1912 Tony Jannus flew a model XII mounted with floats 1,973 mi down the Missouri and Mississippi rivers from Omaha, Nebraska to New Orleans arriving on 16 December.

== Variants ==
- Type XII Military Plane - A tractor biplane with a small square section covered fuselage.

== Survivors ==
A Model XII, factory No.32 built by Edward and Milton Korn in Benoist's shop is on display at the Smithsonian's Steven F. Udvar-Hazy Center. The aircraft had been rebuilt with modifications in 1917 after a 13 August 1913 accident which killed one of its builders, Milton Korn. It was donated to the Air and Space museum in 1949, and restored in 1981.

== Specifications (Benoist Land Tractor Type XII) ==
Data from Smithsonian, Automotive Journal

General characteristics

- Capacity: 2
- Length: 23 ft 7 in (7.19 m)
- Wingspan: 55 ft (17 m)
- Height: 8 ft 2 in (2.49 m)
- Empty weight: 1,045 lb (474 kg)
- Gross weight: 1,750 lb (794 kg)
- Fuel capacity: 20 US gallons (76 L; 17 imp gal) or 50 US gallons (190 L; 42 imp gal) gallon tank
- Powerplant: 1 × Roberts six cylinder inline, 75 hp (56 kW)

Performance

- Cruise speed: 52 kn (60 mph, 97 km/h)
- Rate of climb: 200 ft/min (1.0 m/s)

Avionics

- Wind speed string

== See also ==
- Walter E. Lees interview on the model XII.
- Image of the Model XII
