= Ponche et Primard Tubavion =

1910s French aircraft

General information
- Type: Experimental aircraft
- National origin: France
- Manufacturer: Charles Ponche and Maurice Primard
- Number built: 1

History
- First flight: March 1912

The Ponche et Primard Tubavion was a French experimental monoplane aircraft built in the early 1910s.

== Specifications ==
Data from Aviafrance : Ponche et Primard Tubavion, French Aeroplanes before the Great War

General characteristics

- Crew: 2
- Length: 8.50 m (27 ft 11 in) (Opdycke 9.5 m (31 ft))
- Wingspan: 8.00 m (26 ft 3 in) (Opdycke 9.7 m (32 ft))
- Wing area: 20.00 m^{2} (215.3 sq ft) (Opdycke 18 m^{2} (190 sq ft))
- Empty weight: 420 kg (926 lb) (Opdycke 320 kg (710 lb))
- Powerplant: 1 × Labor 4-cylinder water-cooled in-line piston engine, 52 kW (70 hp) at 800 rpm

(also fitted with a 70 hp (52 kW) Gnome 7 Gamma rotary engine)

- Propellers: 2-bladed fixed-pitch pusher propeller

Performance
