= Benoist Aircraft =

Early (1912 to 1917) manufacturer of aircraft in the United States

Benoist Aircraft Company
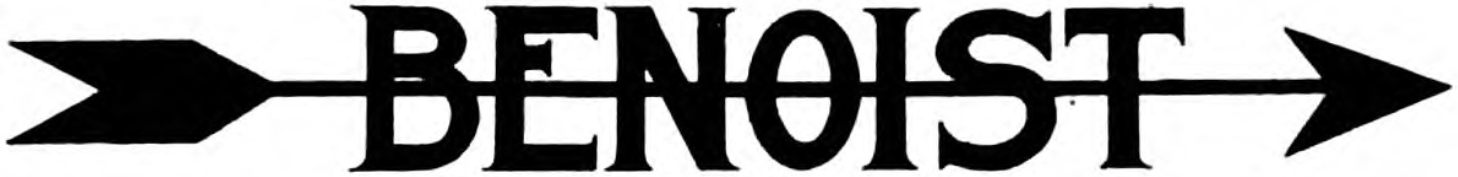
- Industry: Aerospace
- Predecessor: Aeronautic Supply Co
- Founded: 1912
- Founder: Thomas W. Benoist
- Defunct: 1917
- Headquarters: St Louis, Missouri, United States
- Key people: Tony Jannus

The Benoist Aircraft Company was an early manufacturer of aircraft in the United States. It was formed in 1912 in St Louis, Missouri, by Thomas W. Benoist. Over the next five years, it would build 106 aircraft, including Benoist XIVs that would be used for the first heavier-than-air airline service. The company dissolved with Tom Benoist's accidental death in 1917.

== History ==
In 1908 Benoist founded the Aeronautic Supply Co, the first supplier of aircraft parts. On 20 October 1911, the company's factory, along with all of its records, was destroyed by fire.

In 1913, Benoist moved production into the St. Louis Car Company factory run by E. B. Meissner. After Benoist's death, Meissner continued to build aircraft on contract to the government as the St. Louis Aircraft Corporation

Promoter Bill Pickens and Benoist's earlier business partner, publisher E. Percy Noel, sponsored the 1913 "Great Lakes Reliability Tour" to promote the new seaplanes with Benoist aircraft as the featured manufacturer. Benoist originally was going to compete with three aircraft. "The Ark of Duluth" was to be flown by Hugh Robinson, but wrecked prior to the race. Tony Jannus flew a Benoist XIV that suffered a broken propeller, and sunk while being towed to shore.

Benoist built the type XV twin-engine flying boat with hopes to market it as an anti-submarine patrol aircraft for the British government. A round-the-world publicity tour was scheduled and a merger with the Meissner's company to make a thousand examples were in the works when World War I tensions cancelled the efforts. In 1917 Benoist Aircraft moved operations to Sandusky, Ohio.

== Aircraft ==
Model name	First flight	Number built	Type
Benoist Headless	1910	1	Single engine biplane airplane
1912 Benoist	1912	1	Single engine biplane airplane
Benoist Land Tractor Type XII	1912	5	Single engine biplane airplane
Benoist XIV	1913	2	Single engine biplane flying boat
Benoist C	1915	1	Twin engine biplane floatplane
Benoist E	1915	1	Twin engine biplane floatplane
Benoist XV	1915	1	Twin engine biplane flying boat
Benoist XVII	1916	1	Single engine biplane touring airplane
