= Caudron Type B Multiplace =

Type B Multiplace

General information
- Type: Multi-seat biplane
- National origin: France
- Manufacturer: Caudron
- Number built: 1

History
- First flight: 9 or 10 June 1912

The Caudron Type B Multiplace was a large French biplane designed to carry up to five passengers in a cross-country time trial of 1912. It was destroyed early in the event.

== Design and development ==
After the publication in April 1912 of the rules for the Circuit of Anjou time trial, to be held as part of the Grand Prix d'Aviation de l'Aéro-club de France contest in mid-June that year, the Caudron brothers began the design of a competitor that could carry four or five passengers. The emphasis on passenger carrying capacity was determined by the rules: for each passenger weighing over 75 kg (165 lb), the flight time for the required seven circuits of the 163 km (101 mi) course would be reduced by 1/6. With five passengers, competition times would be more than halved to 40% of the flight times. More weight required more power and the rules limited the engine displacement to 12 L (730 cu in). Early Caudron aircraft, like the Type A had used Anzani engines, and a new 10.69 L (652 cu in), 75 kW (100 hp) 14-cylinder Anzani radial engine, essentially two Anzani seven-cylinder engines slightly displaced on a common crankshaft, was chosen.

The passenger load required the Multiplace to have a larger wing area than any of their earlier aircraft, though the wing maintained the general features established previously. Both the upper and lower wings had the same plan, rectangular apart from their tips, though the upper span was 27% greater than the lower. They were fabric covered and built around twin spars, both of which were ahead of mid-chord, leaving most of the length of each rib unsupported and free to warp for roll control. Because of the large span they were three bay wings, the bays separated by three pairs of parallel, vertical interplane struts; there was no stagger. On each wing another pair of parallel masts leaned outwards from the bases of the outer interplane struts to support the overhang of the upper wing and at the wing roots two more pairs of vertical interplane struts supported both the wing centre section and, just above the lower wing, the fuselage, an arrangement also used to support the short nacelle of the Type B.

Instead of the nacelle and the twin booms that supported the empennage on the Type B, the Multiplace had a rectangular section, full length fuselage with the engine in the nose, built around four longerons and fabric covered. There was a long, open cockpit for passengers and pilot, the latter sitting at the back under a little cut-out in the wing trailing edge for better upward vision. The single, roughly rectangular rudder was entirely above the fuselage and was cut away on its underside to allow the deflection of the horizontal tail's trailing edge. The tailplane was mounted on top of the fuselage. The Multiplace had two pairs of mainwheels; each pair was mounted on a long skid with an upturned nose which extended beyond the wing both forward and aft. These held the aircraft close to a take-off attitude on the ground and in this way replaced the lower members of the tailbooms used on other Caudron types of the time. The rear fuselage was protected though by a very tall tailskid. The under-wing skids were placed on longitudinally splayed extensions of the inner interplane struts and transversely braced by pairs of lighter struts to the bases of the centre section struts.

The Multiplace was completed only a few days before the competition began, leaving little time for testing. It flew to Anjou with four passengers. Bad weather on the first day made the intended programme impossible but the next day (17 June) was somewhat better, and the organisers improvised a one-day event. René Caudron decided to take part, though only carrying three passengers in the Multiplace to reduce risks. Flown by Allard and with the engine running roughly, the aircraft climbed to perhaps 12 m (39 ft) before, as an onlooker described, "rearing up" (se cobra), turning rapidly, catching a wingtip on the ground and nosediving in. Three of the occupants escaped without major injury but one, a Caudron mechanic, broke a leg. The Multiplace was not rebuilt and Caudron did not use the fourteen-cylinder Anzani engine again, though they frequently used other models.

== Specifications ==
Data from Hauet (2001) pp.24-5

General characteristics

- Crew: one pilot
- Capacity: four passengers
- Length: 8.30 m (27 ft 3 in)
- Upper wingspan: 15 m (49 ft 3 in)
- Lower wingspan: 11.80 m (38 ft 9 in)
- Wing area: 42 m^{2} (450 sq ft)
- Empty weight: 350 kg (772 lb) estimated minimum
- Gross weight: 800 kg (1,764 lb) estimated
- Fuel capacity: 70 kg (150 lb)
- Powerplant: 1 × Anzani 14 cylinder, 10.69 L (652 cu in) radial engine, 75 kW (100 hp) at 1,400 rpm
- Propellers: 2-bladed
- Range: 157 km (98 mi, 85 nmi) minimum required by course
