= Albert Berry (parachutist) =

American parachuting pioneer

Captain Albert Berry
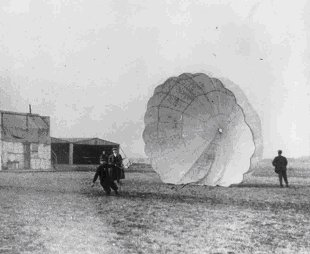
- Born: Albert Berry; March 1, 1878; Philadelphia, Pennsylvania, U.S.
- Known for: Pioneering The Parachute

Albert Berry (born March 1, 1878, date of death unknown) was one of two people credited as the first person to make a successful parachute jump from a powered airplane. Berry made his pioneering jump on March 1, 1912, in St. Louis, Missouri, United States, leaping from a Benoist pusher biplane.

The other contender is Grant Morton, who is reported to have jumped from a Wright Model B piloted by Phil Parmalee over Venice Beach, California, United States, sometime late in 1911.

== Early life ==
Albert Berry was the son of balloonist John Berry. He was born in Philadelphia, Pennsylvania. While living in Detroit around 1891, John Berry and his wife separated. Albert was 10 years old at the time and stayed with his mother while John moved to St. Louis, Missouri. Albert did not see or know the whereabouts of his father for two decades.

== Lynching of Zachariah Walker ==
In August 1911, Albert Berry was in West Chester, Pennsylvania, with his wife for a balloon exhibition when an African-American man, Zachariah "Zack" Walker, was accused of murdering a Worth Brothers company police officer, Edgar Rice, in Coatesville, Pennsylvania. A mob attempted to lynch Walker but a posse succeeded in getting him to jail. Walker was later taken to the local hospital for surgery on his broken jaw, remaining there in custody of a police guard. The next day, the mob stormed the hospital, overwhelming the sole guard and took Walker. That night Walker was lynched—burned alive—near Coatesville. One reporter estimated that 5,000 men, women and children gathered to watch the murder.

The mob's actions were condemned by regional newspapers and local and national political figures such as former U.S. President Theodore Roosevelt. An investigation was launched but was hampered by a "conspiracy of silence". Albert Berry was arrested several days later after making incriminating statements to an officer. Police also believed Berry visited the jail on the day of the lynching to do reconnaissance for the mob that came later that night.

Fifteen men and boys, nearly half under the age of 21, were ultimately indicted on charges related to the murder. At least seven trials were held. The principal witness for the prosecution was Norman Walter Price, who confessed to helping burn Walker, pled guilty to second-degree murder, and turned state's evidence.

Albert Berry was among those indicted. News of the lynching was carried in newspapers across the country, and Berry's father learned of the arrest of a balloonist named Albert Berry. John reached out to the jailed man with a similar name and occupation offering assistance, and soon received a response from Albert Berry, who said he believed he was John's son. After investigation, John verified it was indeed his estranged son who was in jail for murder.

On October 11, 1911, Albert Berry and William Gilbert went on trial for murder. Berry denied he participated in the lynching. After two hours of deliberations, the jury acquitted them. Indeed, all seven trials resulted in acquittals. After Berry was acquitted, Deputy Attorney General J. E. B. Cunningham said, "It seems to be beyond human agency to secure a conviction in the killing of Walker." He ultimately asked that the charges against the rest of the defendants be dropped, as it was clear no convictions could be obtained.

== Parachute jump ==
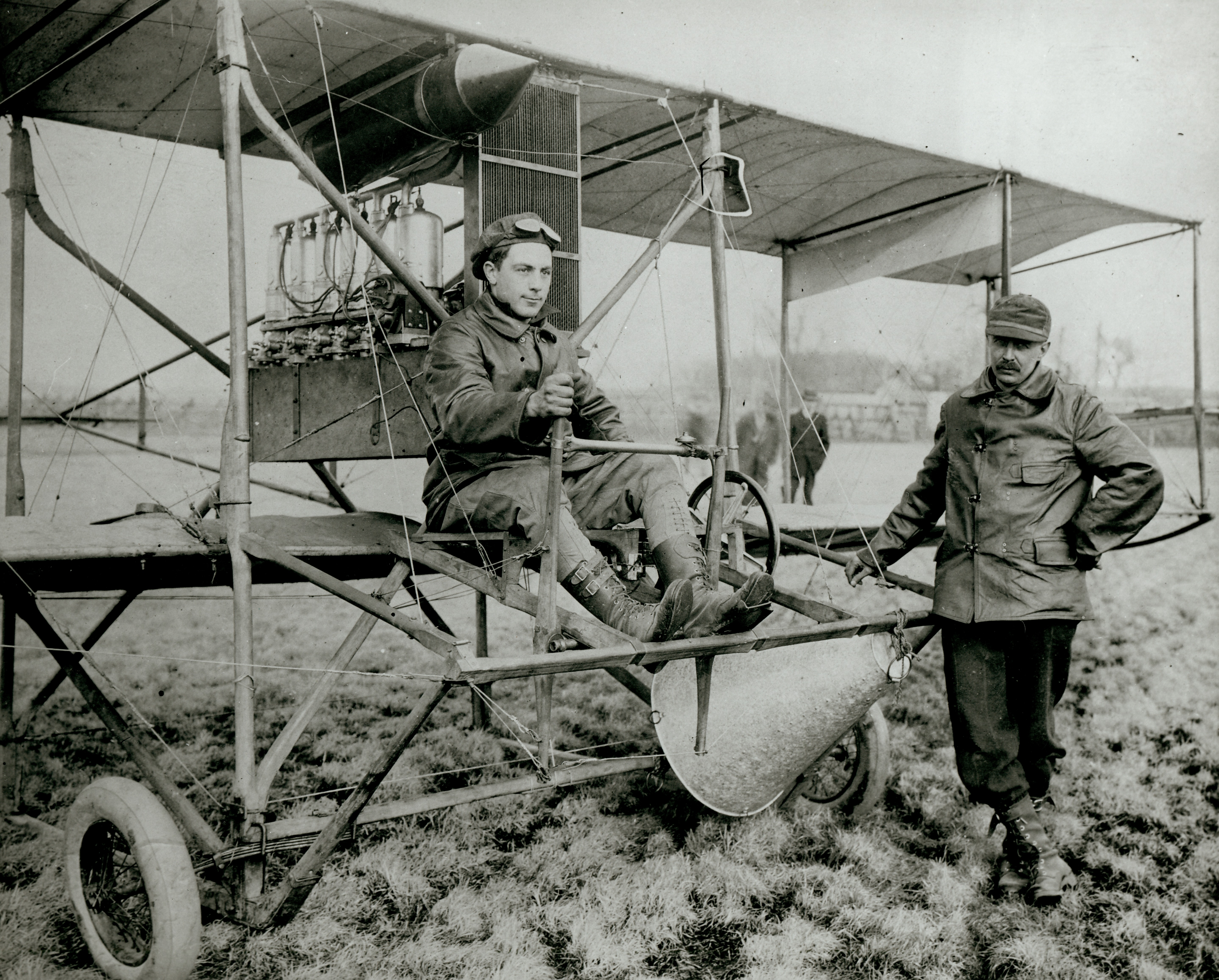
Pilot Tony Jannus and Captain Albert Berry with the Benoist-built bi-plane they used when Berry became the first person to parachute from an airplane on 1 March 1912

Berry had extensive experience parachuting from balloons before his first airplane jump.

On March 1, 1912, Berry sat on a trapeze bar hanging from the front of a Benoist pusher biplane piloted by Tony Jannus. The 36 feet (11 m) diameter parachute was contained in a metal canister attached to the underside of the plane, and to a harness worn by Berry. The plane took off from Kinloch Field—today's St. Louis Lambert International Airport.

At 1,500 feet (460 m), Berry dropped from the plane, his weight pulling the parachute from the canister. He dropped 500 feet (150 m) before the parachute opened. He landed at Jefferson Barracks, Missouri. Berry is credited as being the first man to perform a parachute jump from a moving airplane.

He was a US Army Captain by this time and was also known as "Captain Bert Berry."

Berry jumped from an airplane again on March 10, 1912, in front of a crowd in San Francisco.

In 1960, the UK Antarctic Place-Names Committee (UK-APC) named Mount Berry, a mountain in Antarctica, after Berry.
