= Tony Jannus =

American pilot (1889–1916)

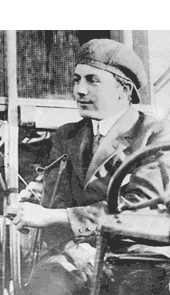
- Born: July 22, 1889; Washington, D.C., U.S.
- Died: October 12, 1916 (aged 27); Black Sea, Czarist Russia
- Occupation: Pilot
- Parent(s): Frankland Jannus, Emiline Carlisle Weightman

Antony Habersack Jannus, more familiarly known as Tony Jannus (July 22, 1889 – October 12, 1916), was an early American pilot whose aerial exploits were widely publicized in aviation's pre-World War I period. He flew the first airplane from which a parachute jump was made, in 1912. Jannus was also the first airline pilot, having pioneered the inaugural flight of the St. Petersburg–Tampa Airboat Line on January 1, 1914, the first scheduled commercial airline flight in the world using heavier-than-air aircraft. The Tony Jannus Award, created to perpetuate his legacy, recognizes outstanding individual achievement in the scheduled commercial aviation industry and is conferred annually by the Tony Jannus Distinguished Aviation Society founded in Tampa, Florida, in 1963.

== Early years ==
Jannus was born in Washington, D.C., where his father Frankland Jannus was a patent attorney and his great-grandfather, Roger C. Weightman, had previously been mayor from 1824 until 1827. By 1910, the 21-year-old was employed as a boat engine mechanic. He became interested in flying when he saw an airshow in Baltimore, Maryland, in November, 1910, and began flight training that year at College Park Airport in Maryland. In 1911, Jannus was the first pilot to fly the Lord Baltimore II, an amphibious airplane built in Baltimore, from the city's Curtis Bay. His older brother, Roger Weightman Jannus (1886-1918), also learned to fly and both brothers became test pilots for airplane builder Thomas W. Benoist in St. Louis, Missouri, in late 1911.

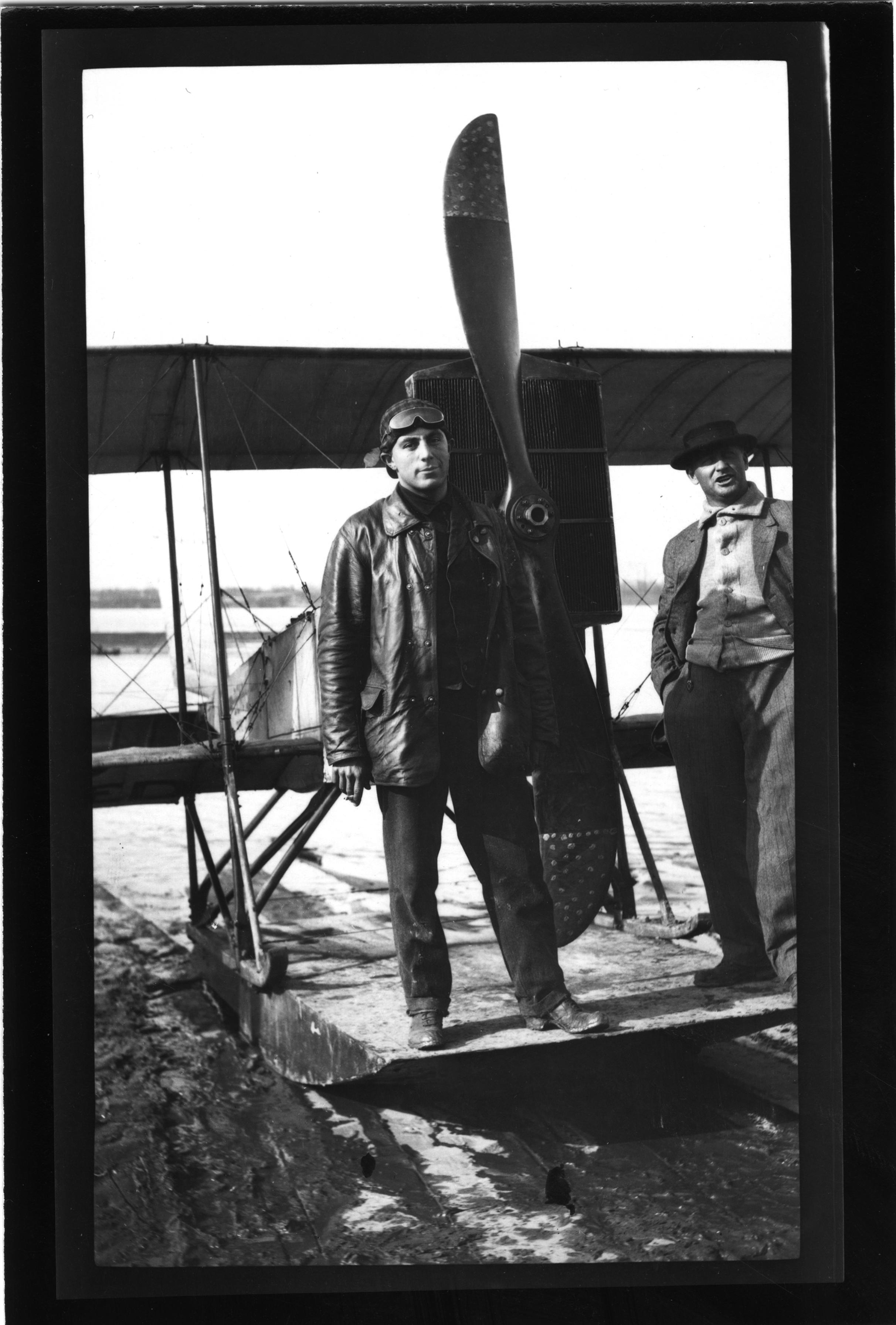
Jannus during Mississippi River flights

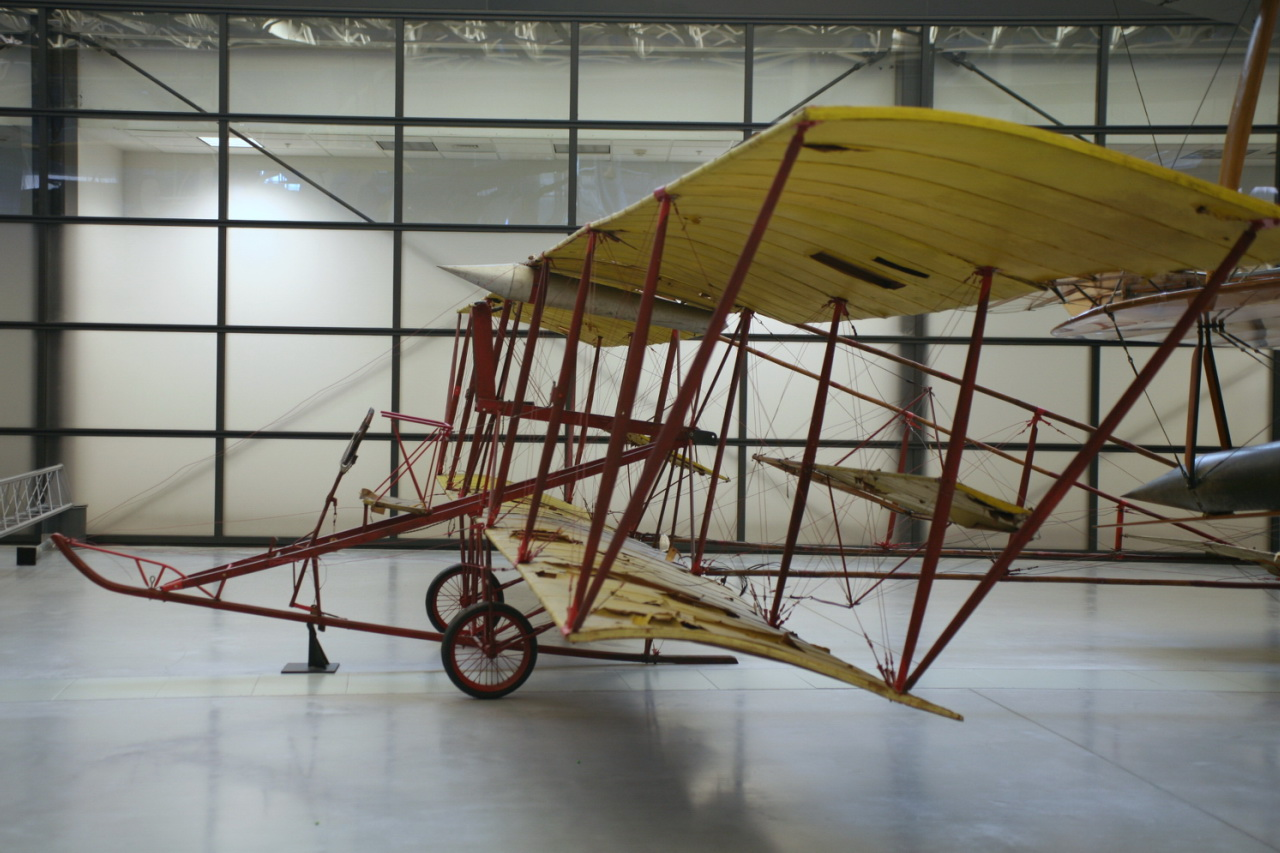
Red Devil, flown by Jannus in 1913, at the Udvar-Hazy Center

On March 1, 1912, Tony Jannus piloted a Benoist biplane when Albert Berry made the first parachute jump from a moving airplane near St. Louis. Later that year, Jannus set a 1,900-mile (3,058 km) overwater flight record following the Missouri and Mississippi Rivers from Omaha, Nebraska, to New Orleans in a Benoist Land Tractor Type XII mounted with floats.

During the Great Lakes Reliability Cruise in 1913, Thomas W. Benoist entered three aircraft flown by Antony Jannus, Hugh Robinson, and Benoist himself.

Also in 1913, Jannus participated in a New York Times-sponsored air exhibition. He flew actress Julia Bruns in a Baldwin Red Devil 4,000 ft above Staten Island for twenty minutes on October 12, 1913. The next day, he flew in an air race over Manhattan, the Times reporting that "The graceful Benoist biplane sailed along on an even keel ... driven by the famous Tony Jannus". Jannus described flying as, "... poetry of mechanical motion, a fascinating sensation of speed, an abstraction from things material into an infinite space." On 15 October, Jannus crashed on take off while setting off to search for Albert Jewell, an aviator who had disappeared over off southern Long Island while flying to join the race on 13 October; Jannus was unhurt in the crash, though the airplane was written off.

In late December, Jannus moved to St. Petersburg, Florida

== First scheduled airline flight ==
Prior to 1914, travel from Tampa, Florida, to St. Petersburg, located on a then-isolated peninsula, required a slow steamboat trip across Tampa Bay or a circuitous, five-hour journey by railroad. A bumpy automobile or horse and buggy ride took many hours over primitive, unpaved roads. The airplane at the time was a rare novelty, lacking any practical application. Impressed by the record-setting overwater flight made by Jannus in 1912, Florida businessman Percival Fansler approached some St. Petersburg businessmen the next year with a proposal to use Benoist flying boats for "a real commercial line" over open water between the two cities. Convinced by Fansler's plan, several St. Petersburg community leaders, led by L. A. Whitney of the local chamber of commerce and Noel Mitchell, agreed to provide financial support for the creation of an airline service to connect the two cities. A 90-day contract with Benoist was signed on December 17, 1913 (the 10th anniversary of Wilbur and Orville Wright's historic first airplane flight), to provide airplanes and crew for two daily round trips across Tampa Bay, dubbed the St. Petersburg–Tampa Airboat Line—the world's first scheduled airline.

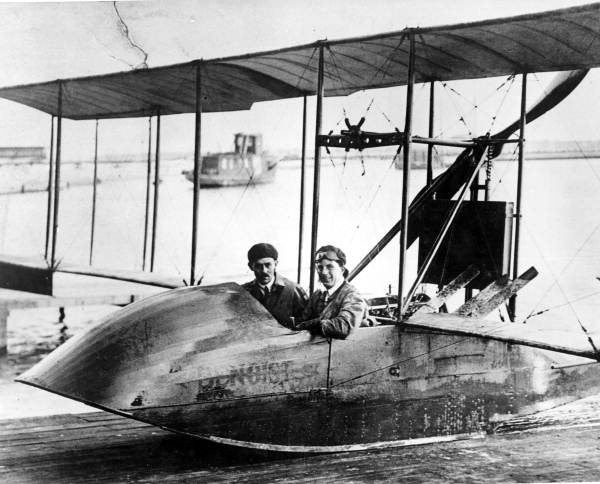
Tony Jannus piloting the Benoist flying boat

Fansler told the St. Petersburg Times: "The St. Petersburg waterfront is an ideal place for starting and landing as the trip to and from Tampa will be one of the most beautiful in the country. Skimming a few feet above the surface of the water ... with the purr of a 75 h.p. engine and the whirring of a propeller turning several hundred times a minute, the rush of the cool salt air and the shimmering sunlight on Tampa Bay—no trip could be more enjoyable.".

Departing from a location on January 1, 1914, near the downtown St. Petersburg Municipal Pier on Second Avenue North, Jannus piloted the twenty-three-minute inaugural flight of the pioneer airline's Benoist XIV flying boat biplane. A crowd of 3,000 gathered at the pier to watch the history-making takeoff at 10 a.m. and were told by Fansler that "What was impossible yesterday is an accomplishment today, while tomorrow heralds the unbelieveable" [sic]. Abram C. Pheil, former mayor of St. Petersburg, won an auction for the first ticket with a winning bid of $400 and was a passenger on the inaugural flight . It was the first time a ticket was sold to the general public for point-to-point scheduled air travel. The Benoist reportedly reached a maximum speed of 75 miles per hour (121 km/h) during the flight, according to a United Press account. Other reports indicate that Jannus flew over the Bay at an altitude of less than 50 feet (15 m). Upon the airboat's arrival in Tampa, the Tampa Tribune reported, "a crowd of two thousand was waiting ... Messrs. Jannus and Pheil bowed and smiled". Thereafter, flights departed St. Petersburg daily except Sundays at 10 a.m. and 2 p.m.. Return flights left Tampa at 11 a.m. and 3 p.m.

== Curtiss test pilot ==
Following the end of the St. Petersburg–Tampa Airboat Line's scheduled service between the two Florida cities on March 31, 1914, Jannus left St. Petersburg in May and quit flying for Benoist, becoming a test pilot for Curtiss Aeroplane Company. In July, 1915, Jannus successfully flew the prototype Curtiss JN-3, forerunner of the JN-4 "Jenny" of World War I fame. On October 1, 1915, he was sent by Glenn Curtiss to Russia as the company's test pilot and trainer of Russian pilots flying Curtiss airplanes in combat during World War I.

== Death ==
Jannus died on October 12, 1916, near Sevastopol (then part of Czarist Russia) when his plane, a Curtiss H-7 he was using to train Russian pilots, had engine problems and crashed into the Black Sea, killing Jannus and his two-man Russian crew. His body was never recovered.

== Legacy ==
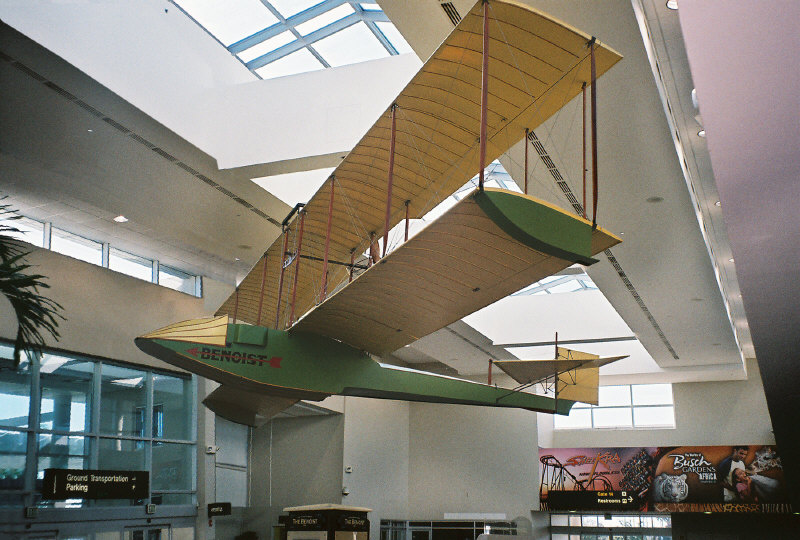
Replica of the Benoist XIV flown by Jannus on January 1, 1914—the first scheduled commercial airline flight—displayed at St. Petersburg-Clearwater International Airport

The Tony Jannus Distinguished Aviation Society founded in 1963, perpetuates the memory of Jannus as the first commercial airline pilot, by annually conferring the Tony Jannus Award for outstanding achievement in scheduled air transportation. Past recipients of the award have been influential in aviation. These include Eddie Rickenbacker, Donald Douglas, Jimmy Doolittle, C. R. Smith (the founder of American Airlines), William A. Patterson (president of United Airlines 1934–1966), Robert Crandall, and Chuck Yeager. Those so honored are enshrined at the St. Petersburg Museum of History's Tony Jannus exhibit.

An operational replica of the Benoist Model XIV airplane flew across Tampa Bay in a 75th anniversary re-enactment of Jannus's flight, on January 1, 1989. It is now exhibited at the St. Petersburg Museum of History at the St. Petersburg Pier, approximately 100 yards (91 m) from the site of the inaugural flight. On January 29, 2011, the American Institute of Aeronautics and Astronautics dedicated an historic site plaque on the museum's grounds, commemorating the site of the world’s first regularly scheduled airline. The birth of the commercial air transportation industry is also commemorated by another replica of the Benoist airplane at the St. Petersburg-Clearwater International Airport's baggage claim area in the terminal and a Tony Jannus Award exhibit at Tampa International Airport.

On December 17, 2006, Jannus was posthumously inducted into the Paul E. Garber First Flight Shrine at the Wright Brothers National Memorial at Kitty Hawk, North Carolina, joining other honorees such as Wilbur and Orville Wright, Charles Lindbergh, Amelia Earhart, and Chuck Yeager, who have shaped the aviation industry. Jannus was designated a "Great Floridian" by the State of Florida in 2010. The St. Petersburg concert venue Jannus Landing (now known as Jannus Live) is named for him.
