= Timeline of Lakeland, Florida =

The following is a timeline of the history of the city of Lakeland, Florida, United States.

== 19th century ==
- 1884
  - South Florida Railroad begins operating
  - Freedmen establish St. John's Baptist Church in what would come to be called the Moorehead community south of Lake Wire
  - Town platted on land of Abraham Munn
- 1885 – Town of Lakeland incorporated on January 1, 1885. Kentucky businessman, Abraham Munn, who had purchased 80 acres of land in what is now downtown Lakeland in 1882 and platted the land for the town the previous year. He donated the land and money to build the first railroad depot in Lakeland which helped boost transportation and enterprise
- 1891 – Electric lighting introduced
- 1894
  - Acton becomes part of Lakeland
  - "Freeze damages citrus crops"
- 1900 – Population: 1,180

== 20th century ==
- 1904 – Fire
- 1905 – Population: 3,299
- 1910 – Munn Park and the Confederate monument were dedicated
- 1911 – Lakeland Evening Telegram newspaper begins publication
- 1912 – Auditorium built
- 1913 – City Hall built
- 1915 – Lakeland Morning Star newspaper begins publication
- 1916 – Morrell Memorial Hospital opens
- 1921 – William Bowles was the last of 20 African-American men lynched in the county since Reconstruction; he had allegedly insulted a white woman
- 1922 – Florida Southern College relocates to Lakeland
- 1924 – Lakeland Terrace Hotel in business
- 1925 – Henley Field Ball Park opens
- 1928 – Lakeland Theatre in business
  - – The first high school is opened for Mooreland black students
- 1930 – Population: 18,554
- 1933 – Junior Welfare League of Lakeland formed
- 1935 – Southeastern College of the Assemblies of God established
- 1936 – WLAK radio begins broadcasting
- 1937 – Roxy Theatre in business (approximate date)
- 1941 – Lakeland Ledger newspaper begins publication
- 1949 – WONN radio begins broadcasting
- 1953 – Filmland Drive-In cinema in business
- 1957 – WWAB radio begins broadcasting
- 1960 – Lakeland Indians baseball team formed
- 1966 – Joker Marchant Stadium opens
- 1967 – Much of the Moorehead community is displaced as city uses eminent domain to buy property for civic center and later Veterans Memorial Park
- 1977 – "It snows in Lakeland"
- 1980 – Population: 47,406
- 1988 – Lakeland Square Mall in business
- 1990 – Population: 70,576
- 1993
  - George Jenkins High School opens
  - International Sport Aviation Museum established
- 1998 – Lakeland.net website online (approximate date)

== 21st century ==
- 2004 – August: Hurricane Charley occurs
- 2005 – Lakeside Village shopping center in business
- 2009 – Gow Fields was elected as Lakeland's first African-American mayor
- 2010 – Population: 97,422
- 2014 – Florida Polytechnic University opens
- 2020 – Population: 112,641
- 2021 – September: A shooting and subsequent shootout occurs in Lakeland, killing four people and injuring a fifth, and resulting in the arrest of a suspect
- 2022 – Opening of Bonnet Springs Park

== See also ==
- Lakeland history
- List of mayors of Lakeland, Florida
- Polk County history
- National Register of Historic Places listings in Polk County, Florida
- Timelines of other cities in the Central Florida area of Florida: Clearwater, Largo, Orlando, St. Petersburg, Tampa

== Bibliography ==
- "Lakeland". Florida Gazetteer and Business Directory 1907-1908. R. L. Polk & Co. 1907.
- "Lakeland". Florida State Gazetteer and Business Directory. R. L. Polk & Co. 1918.
- Lakeland and Polk County Directory. R.L. Polk & Co. 1923.
- Federal Writers’ Project (1939). "Lakeland". Florida: a Guide to the Southernmost State. American Guide Series. New York: Oxford University Press. pp. 515–518 – via Google Books.
- This Was Yesterday: a History of Lakeland, Florida. Junior Welfare League of Greater Lakeland. 1973.
- Hampton Dunn (1976). Yesterday's Lakeland.
- Lynn M. Homan; Thomas Reilly (2001). Lakeland. Images of America. Charleston, South Carolina: Arcadia. ISBN 978-0-7385-1398-0.
- Paul T. Hellmann (2006). "Florida". Historical Gazetteer of the United States. Taylor & Francis. ISBN 1-135-94859-3.
