= Timeline of St. Petersburg, Florida =

The following is a timeline of the history of the city of St. Petersburg in Pinellas County, Florida, United States.

== Late 19th century ==
- 1875 – John C. Williams purchases land.
- 1884 – The St. Petersburg Times was established.
- 1888
  - Peter Demens brings railroad into St. Petersburg.
  - The first hotel is built, named the Detroit Hotel.
- 1892
  - Town of St. Petersburg incorporated.
  - David Moffett becomes first mayor of St. Petersburg.
- 1897 – Electrical service established.
- 1899
  - Orange Belt Railway constructs the Railroad Pier.
  - Henry W. Hibbs introduces major fishing business.
- 1900 – Population: 1,575

== 20th century ==
- 1903 – City of St. Petersburg incorporated.
- 1904 – Trolley services enter St. Petersburg by F. A. Davis.
- 1906
  - The Electric Pier is built, replacing the Railroad Pier.
  - Shipping channel dredging begins.
- 1910 – Population: 4,127
- 1913 – The Municipal Pier is built, replacing the Electric Pier.
- 1914
  - St. Louis Browns invited to use St. Petersburg for spring training at Coffee Pot Park.
  - The St. Petersburg-Tampa Airboat Line perform the first commercial flight with a Benoist XIV flying boat.
- 1915 – Mirror Lake Library opens.
- 1916 – Al Lang becomes mayor.

== St. Petersburg–Tampa Airboat Line ==
A Benoist XIV was used for flights.

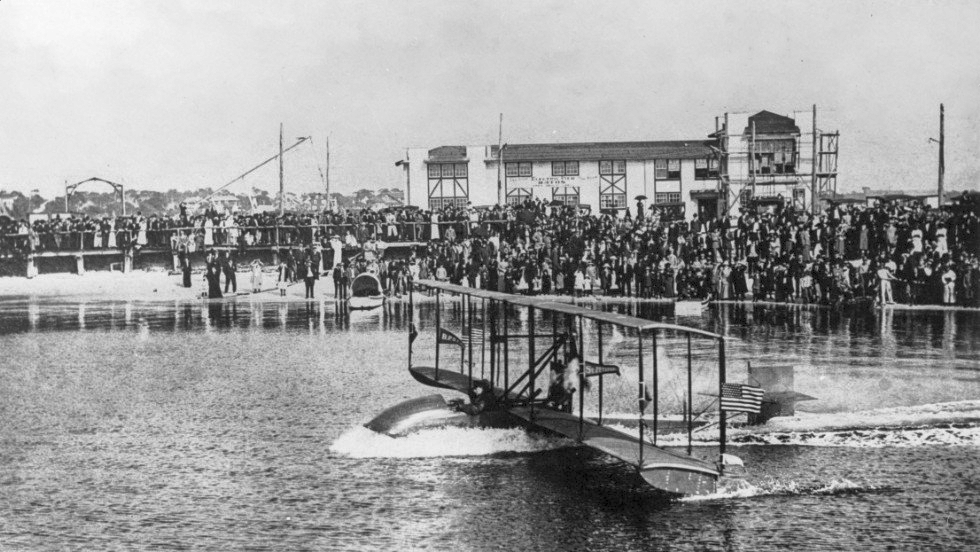
First takeoff run, January 1, 1914.

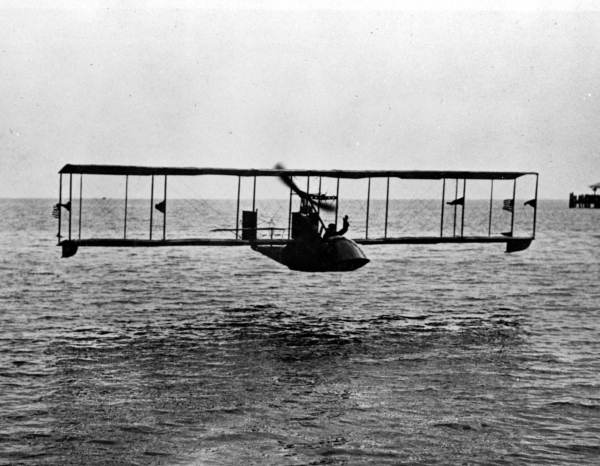
Airplane over Tampa Bay in 1914
- 1920 – Population: 14,237
- 1921
  - St. Petersburg Museum of History is founded.
  - 1921 Tampa Bay hurricane.
- 1924
  - The United States Coast Guard opens base.
  - Gandy Bridge opens.
- 1925 – The Vinoy Park Hotel is built.
- 1926 – Millions Dollar Pier is constructed, replacing the Municipal Pier.
- 1928 – WSUN radio begins broadcasting.
- 1930 – Population: 40,425
- 1940 – Population: 60,812
- 1942 – St. Petersburg used a training facility for the Army Air Force.
- 1947 – Original Al Lang Stadium is built.
- 1950 – Population: 96,738
- 1953 – WSUN-TV (television) begins broadcasting.
- 1954 – The original Sunshine Skyway Bridge opens.
- 1960
  - Population: 181,298.
  - Howard Frankland Bridge is constructed.
- 1965
  - Museum of Fine Arts is established.
  - Bayfront Center is constructed.
- 1968 – Roman Catholic Diocese of Saint Petersburg established.
- 1970 – Population: 216,159.
- 1973 – The St. Petersburg Pier is built.
- 1976 – Al Lang Stadium is rebuilt.
- 1980
  - Population: 238,647.
  - The south bound span of the Sunshine Skyway Bridge collapses due to the MV Summit Venture striking a pier.
- 1982 – Salvador Dalí Museum is established.
- 1987 – The new Sunshine Skyway Bridge is constructed.
- 1990
  - Population: 238,629.
  - Tropicana Field is constructed.
  - One Progress Plaza is constructed.
- 1992 – Florida Holocaust Museum is established.
- 1993
  - Original Sunshine Skyway Bridge is demolished.
  - Mazzaro Italian Market opened
- 1998 – Tampa Bay Rays established as Tampa Bay Devil Rays.
- 2000 – Population: 248,232

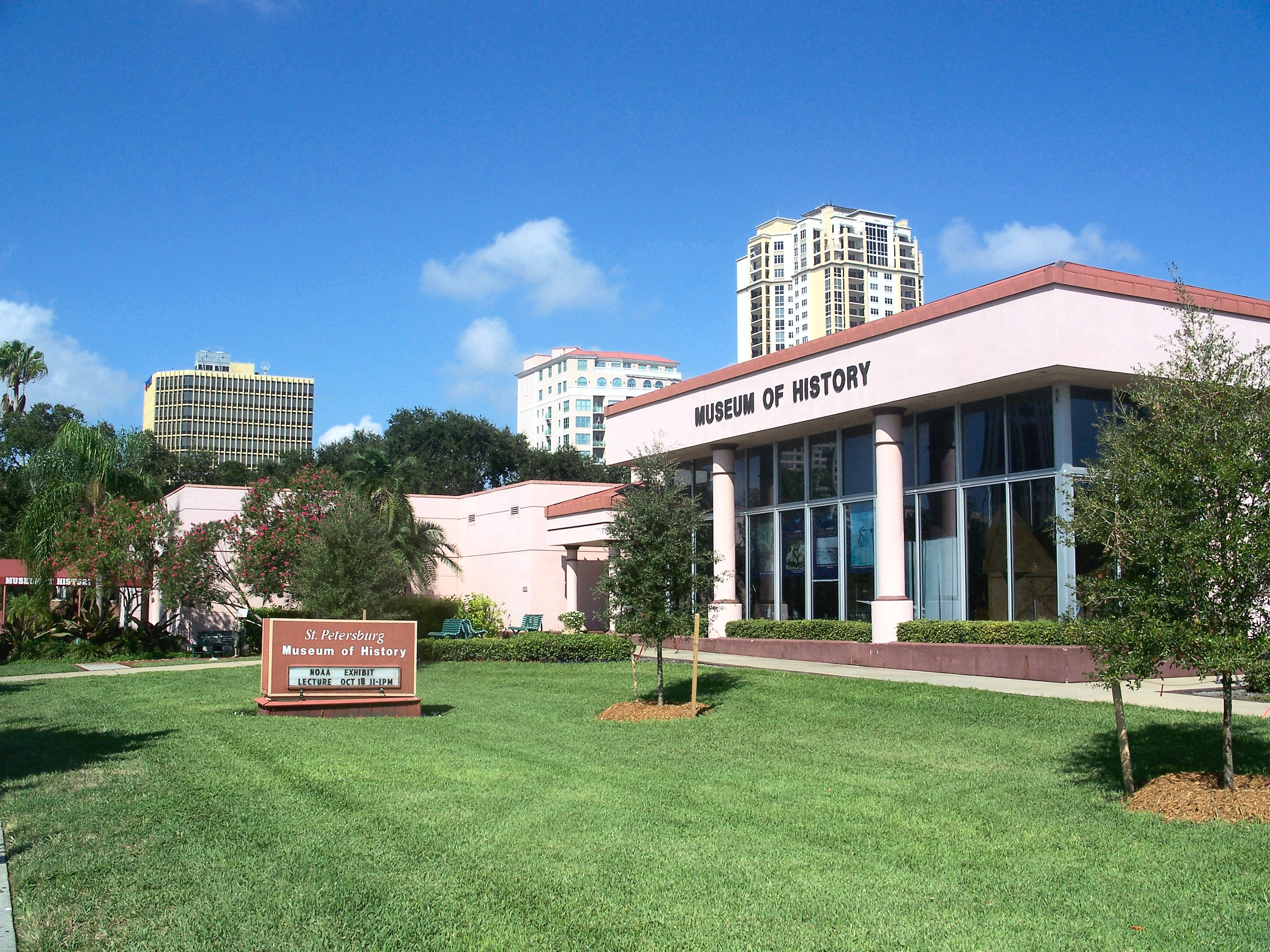
St. Petersburg, Florida: Museum of History. The St. Petersburg Museum of History (SPMOH) is a history museum located in St. Petersburg, Florida, dedicated to covering the area's history. As of 2020, the museum's director is Rui Farias

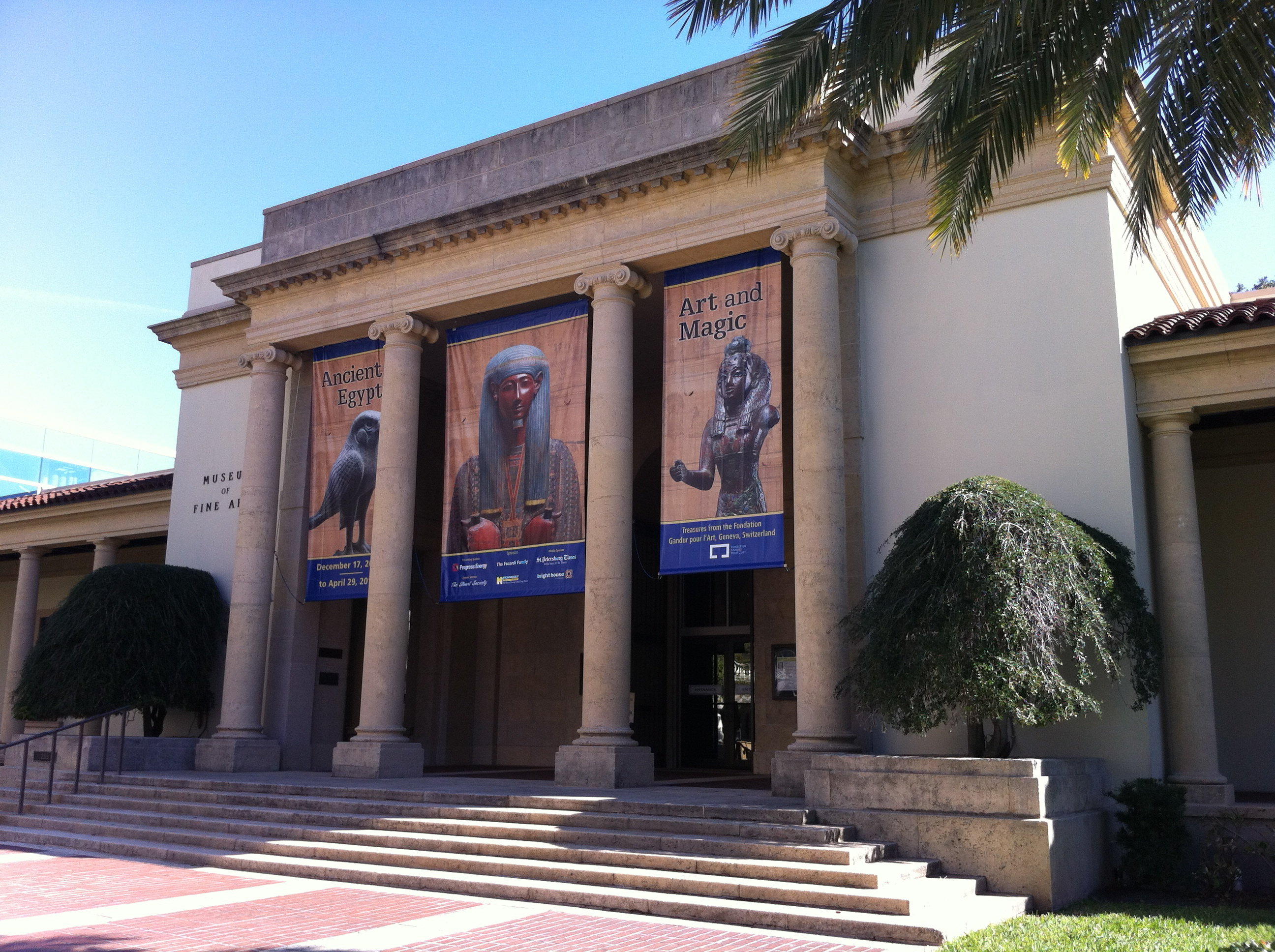
Museum of Fine Arts St. Petersburg

== 21st century ==
- 2001 – Rick Baker becomes mayor.
- 2003
  - Wikimedia Foundation established.
  - First ever St. Pete Pride celebration and declaration of June being Pride month
- 2004 – Bayfront Center is demolished.
- 2009 – Signature Place is constructed.
- 2010
  - Population: 244,769
  - Bill Foster becomes mayor.
- 2011 – Salvador Dalí Museum is established in current building.
- 2014 – Rick Kriseman becomes mayor.
- 2015
  - The St. Petersburg Pier is demolished.
  - The History Council of St. Petersburg is formed.
- 2017 – Rick Kriseman is re-elected as mayor.
- 2020 – St. Pete Pier opens.

== See also ==
- List of mayors of St. Petersburg, Florida
- History of St. Petersburg, Florida
- National Register of Historic Places listings in Pinellas County, Florida
- Timelines of other cities in the Central Florida area of Florida: Clearwater, Lakeland, Largo, Orlando, Tampa

== Bibliography ==
- St. Petersburg, Florida. Black America. Charleston, South Carolina: Arcadia. 2003.
