= Timeline of Tampa, Florida =

The following is a timeline of the history of the city of Tampa in Hillsborough County, Florida, United States.

== 19th century ==
- 1821 – Spain transfers control of Florida to the United States per the Adams-Onis Treaty
- 1824 – Fort Brooke established by U.S. Army on Tampa Bay in the Territory of Florida.
- 1831 – Tampa Bay post office established.

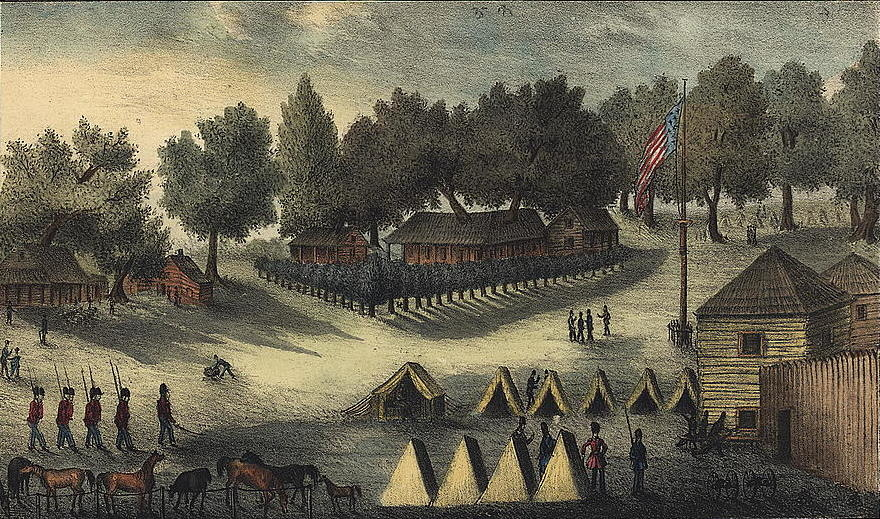
Fort Brooke ca. 1840

- 1845 – Tampa Bay becomes part of the new U.S. state of Florida.
- 1848 – 1848 Tampa Bay hurricane.
- 1849 – Village of Tampa incorporated.
- 1850 – Oaklawn Cemetery established.
- 1855 – Town of Tampa incorporated.
- 1856 – Joseph B. Lancaster becomes mayor.
- 1859 – First Baptist Church established.
- 1861 – Florida secedes the US and joins the Confederate States of America during the American Civil War
- 1862 – June 30-July 1: Battle of Tampa.
- 1863 – October 16–18: Battle of Fort Brooke.
- 1873
  - Yellow fever outbreak.
  - Tampa Guardian newspaper in publication.
- 1877 – Gainesville-Tampa stagecoach begins operating.
- 1882 – Hillsborough High School opens.
- 1884 – Henry Plant's South Florida Railroad begins operating.
- 1885 – Board of Trade established.
- 1886 - Ybor City established by Vicente Martinez Ybor; first cigar factories open
- 1887
  - Ybor City annexed by city of Tampa.
  - Tampa Electric Company established.
- 1888 – Plant Park laid out.
- 1889 – Florida Railway begins operating.
- 1890
  - Tampa Business College established.
  - Telephone service established.
- 1891
  - Tampa Bay Hotel built.
  - Cuban José Martí speaks in Ybor City in support of Cuban independence.
- 1893 – Tampa Daily Times newspaper begins publication.
- 1895 – Tampa Fire Department established.
- 1899
  - Burgert Brothers photo studio established.
  - Circulo Cubano founded.
- 1900 – Tampa Woman's Club formed.

== 20th century ==
=== 1900s-1950s ===
- 1901 – Jackson Rooming House in business.

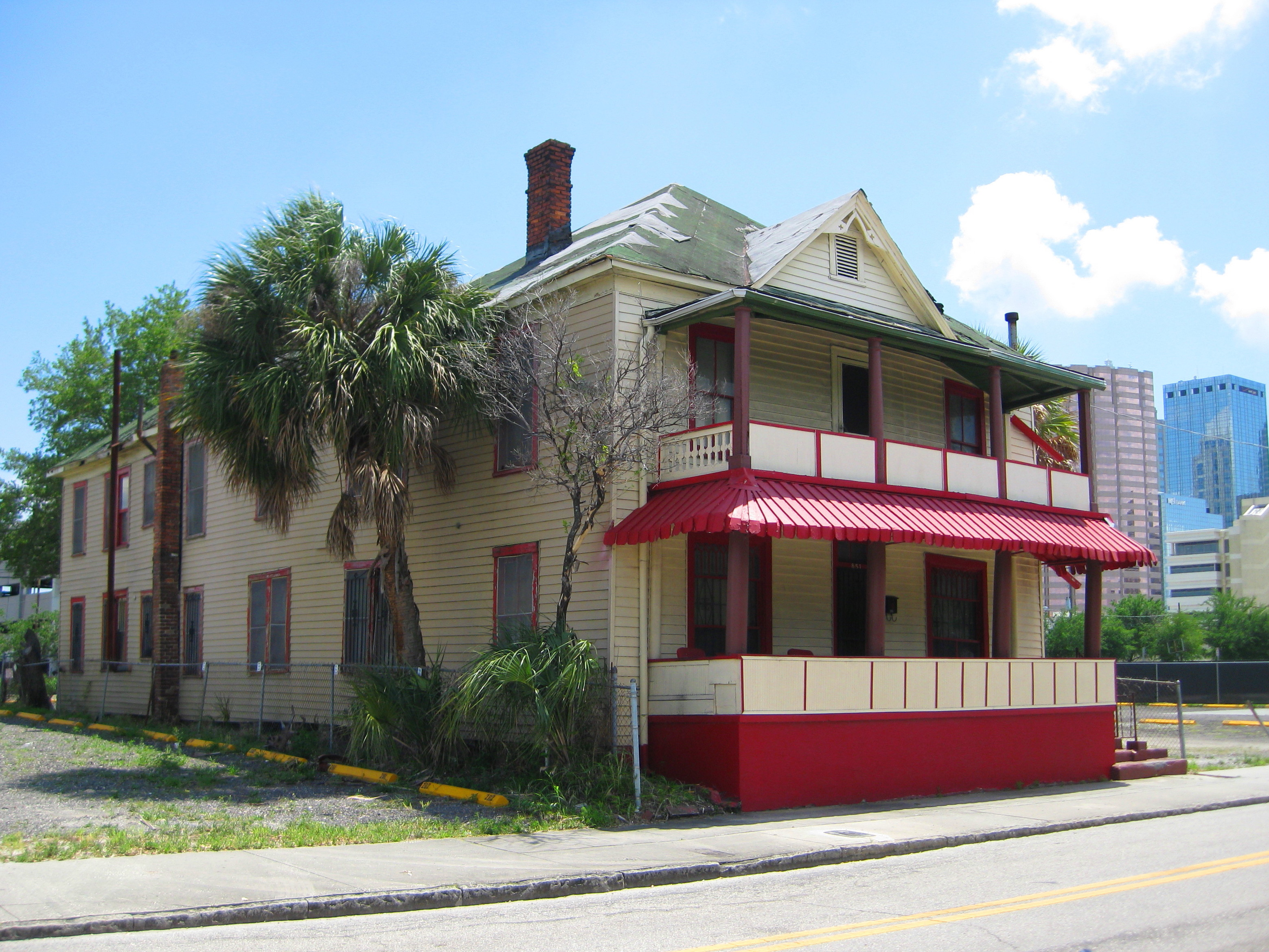
Jackson Rooming House

- 1904 – South Florida Fair and Gasparilla Parade begin.
- 1905
  - Columbia Restaurant in business.
  - Sacred Heart Catholic Church and United States Courthouse Building constructed.
- 1907
  - St. Andrew's Episcopal Church built.
  - Havatampa Cigar Company in business.
- 1908 – YMCA built.
- 1912
  - Union Station opens.
  - El Centro Español de Tampa building constructed.
  - El Comercio Spanish-language newspaper begins publication.
  - Union Hotel in business.
- 1913 – Centro Asturiano de Tampa building constructed.
- 1914 – St. Petersburg-Tampa Airboat Line begins operating.

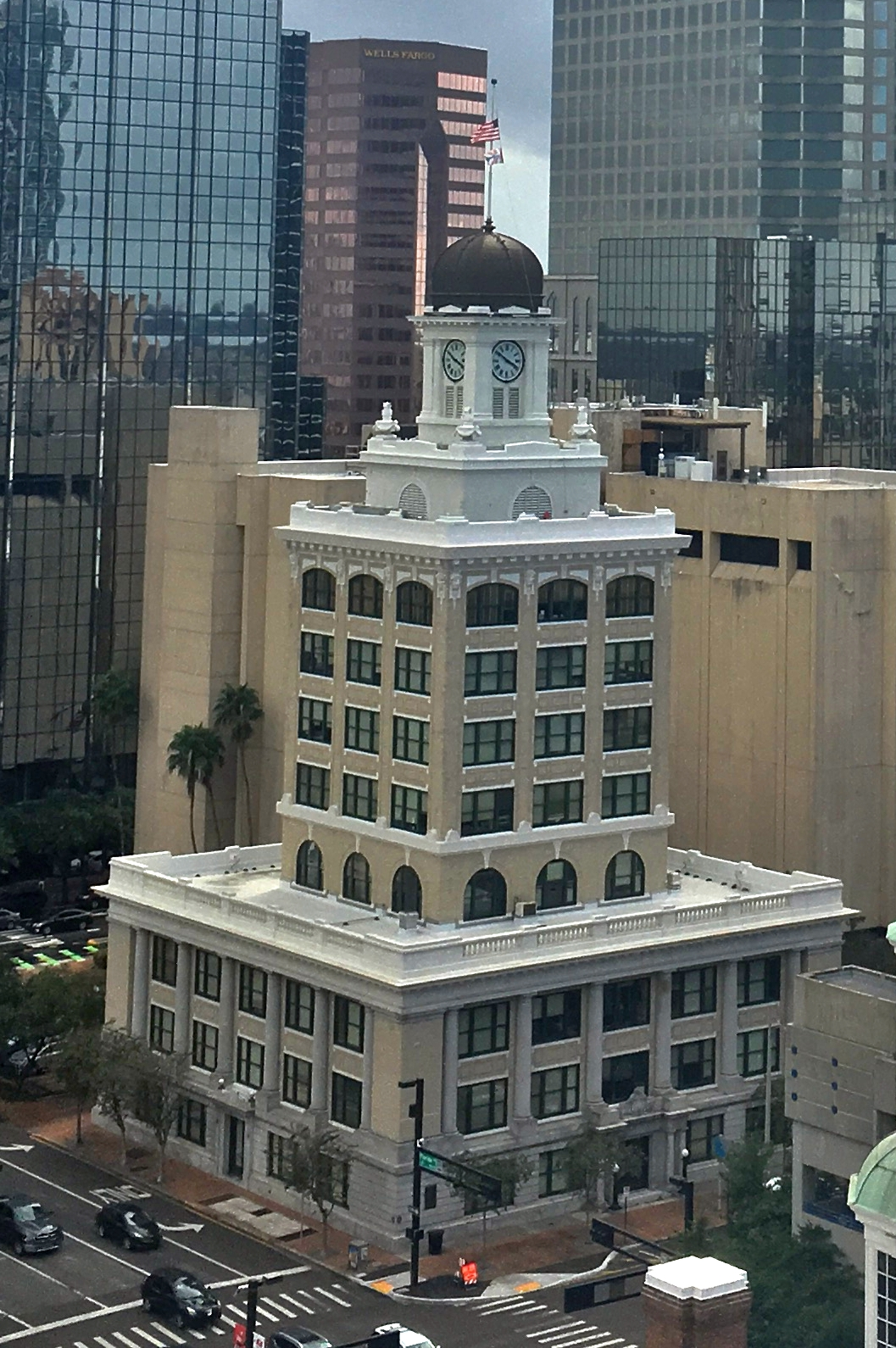
Tampa City Hall

- 1915 – Tampa City Hall built.
- 1916 – Heraldo Dominical Spanish-language newspaper begins publication.
- 1917
  - Tampa Public Library opens.
  - Circulo Cubano de Tampa rebuilt.
- 1918 – Unione Italiana building constructed.
- 1920 – Population: 51,608.
- 1922
  - WDAE radio begins broadcasting.
  - La Gaceta trilingual newspaper begins publication.
- 1924 – Gandy Bridge to St. Petersburg built.
- 1925
  - West Tampa annexed by City of Tampa.
  - Municipal Auditorium built.
  - WFLA radio begins broadcasting.
- 1926
  - Junior League of Tampa founded.
  - Tampa Theatre opens.
- 1927
  - Sulphur Springs Water Tower erected.
  - Floridan Hotel in business.
- 1930 – Population: 101,161.
- 1931
  - Labor strike of cigar workers.
  - Tampa Junior College established.
- 1934 – Davis Causeway opens.
- 1938 – Janus Administration Building constructed.
- 1939 – U.S. Army Southeast Air Base established.
- 1940 – Population: 108,391.
- 1950 – Population: 124,681.
- 1955 - WFLA-TV and WTVT (television) begin broadcasting.
- 1956 – Britton Plaza Shopping Center in business.
- 1957 – Lowry Park Zoo opens.
- 1959 – Busch Gardens theme park in business.

=== 1960s-1990s ===
- 1960 – Population: 274,970.
- 1962 – Museum of Science and Industry founded.
- 1965 - Curtis Hixon Hall opens
- 1966 – Franklin Exchange Building constructed.
- 1970 – Population: 277,767.
- 1972 - Sant'Yago Knight Parade begins.
- 1977
  - New Florida State Fairgrounds hosts first fair
  - Floriland Cinema in business.
- 1978 – Cracker Country (museum) established.
- 1979
  - May 8: Storm.
  - Tampa Museum of Art founded.
- 1980
  - Hillsborough Area Regional Transit established.
  - Population: 271,523.
- 1981 – Feeding America Tampa Bay active (approximate date).
- 1982 – Foreign trade zone and Ybor City Museum Society established.
- 1984 – Tampa-Hillsborough County Public Library System established.
- 1986 – Barnett Plaza (hi-rise) built.
- 1987
  - Tampa Bay Performing Arts Center opens.
  - Children's Museum founded.
- 1988 – Rivergate Tower built.
- 1989 – Tampa Bay History Center founded.
- 1990
  - Tampa Convention Center opens
  - Tampa International Gay and Lesbian Film Festival begins.
  - Population: 280,015.
- 1992 – AmSouth Building and SunTrust Financial Centre constructed.
- 1995 – Florida Aquarium opens.

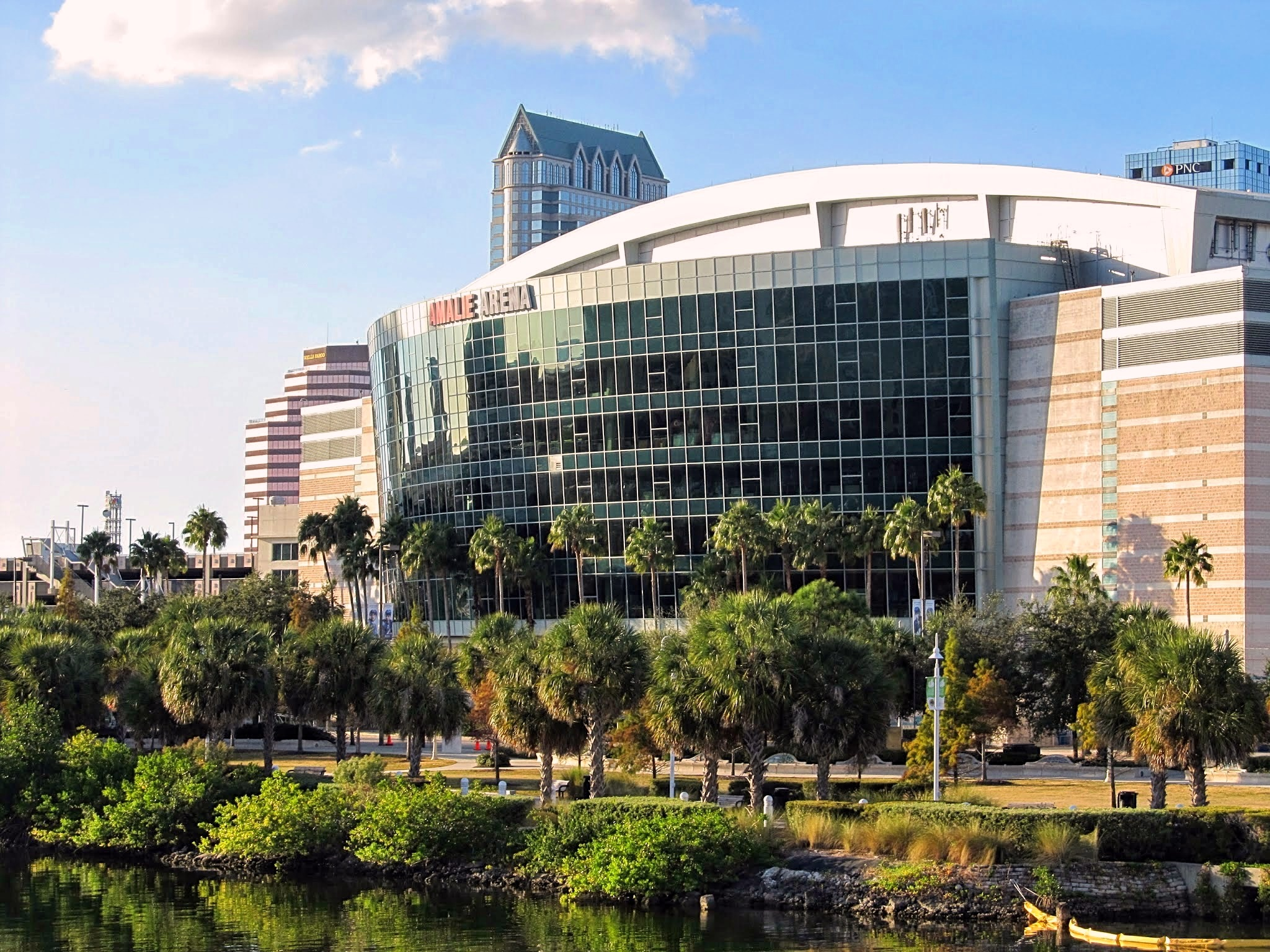
The Ice Palace (now Benchmark International Arena)

- 1996
  - City website online.
  - Ice Palace arena opens.
- 1997 - Tampa Police Museum founded.
- 2000 - Channelside 9 Cinemas in business.

== 21st century ==
- 2001
  - Tampa Gallery of Photographic Arts opens.
  - Ruby (programming language) conference held in city.
- 2002
  - January 5: 2002 Tampa plane crash.
  - TECO Line Streetcar begins operating; Centennial Park Station and Tampa Bay Federal Credit Union Station open.
- 2003 – Whiting Station opens.
- 2004
  - Ford Amphitheatre opens.
  - First segments of Tampa Riverwalk open
- 2007
  - SkyPoint built.
  - Kathy Castor becomes U.S. representative for Florida's 11th congressional district.
- 2009 – Tampa Bay History Center opens.
- 2010
  - Population: city 335,709; metro 2,783,243.
  - Curtis Hixon Waterfront Park opens
- 2011
  - Florida Voices begins publication.
  - Bob Buckhorn becomes mayor.
  - Population: 346,037; metro 2,824,724.
- 2012 – 2012 Republican National Convention held in Tampa
- 2014 – Tampa Baseball Museum opens.
- 2018-21 – First phase of Water Street district construction

== See also ==
- History of Tampa, Florida
- History of Ybor City
- List of mayors of Tampa, Florida
- National Register of Historic Places listings in Hillsborough County, Florida
- Timelines of other cities in the Central Florida area of Florida: Clearwater, Lakeland, Largo, Orlando, St. Petersburg

== Bibliography ==
- John R. Richards, ed. (1886). "Tampa". Florida State Gazetteer and Business Directory. New York: South Publishing Company. OCLC 12186532.
- Wen Galvez (1897). Tampa: impresiones de emigrado (in Spanish). Establecimiento Tipográfico Cuba.
- "Tampa", Rand, McNally & Co.'s Handy Guide to the Southeastern States, Chicago: Rand, McNally & Co., 1899
- "Tampa". Florida Gazetteer and Business Directory 1907-1908. R. L. Polk & Co. 1907.
- Rinaldi's Guide Book to the City of Tampa, Tampa, 1915, OL 24343079M
- "Tampa". Florida State Gazetteer and Business Directory. R. L. Polk & Co. 1918. + part 2
- "Tampa". Automobile Blue Book. USA. 1919.
- Federal Writers' Project (1939), "Tampa", Florida; a Guide to the Southernmost State, American Guide Series, ISBN 9781623760090 – via Google Books (also via Open Library)
- Durward Long (1966). "Historical Beginnings of Ybor City and Modern Tampa". Florida Historical Quarterly. 45 (1): 31–44. JSTOR 30145699.
- Durward Long (1971). "Making of Modern Tampa: A City of the New South, 1885-1911". Florida Historical Quarterly. 49 (4): 333–345. JSTOR 30140624.
- Ory Mazar Nergal, ed. (1980), "Tampa", Encyclopedia of American Cities, New York: E. P. Dutton, OL 4120668M
- D.M. Stowers, Jr.; Michael Levasseur (1980), "Tampa Bay Storm of May, 1979", Florida Geographer, 14, ISSN 0739-0041 – via Florida Atlantic University
- Gary R. Mormino, "Tampa: From Hell Hole to the Good Life", in Richard M. Bernard and Bradley R. Rice, eds., Sunbelt Cities: Politics and Growth Since World War II (Austin, 1983)
- Frommer's Portable Tampa Bay & St. Petersburg, 1998, OL 9936122M
- Patricia Dillon (1999). "Clubwomen and Civic Activism: Willie Lowry and Tampa's Club Movement". Florida Historical Quarterly. 77 (4): 429–444. JSTOR 30150827.
- "South of Orlando: Tampa", Orlando & Central Florida, Lonely Planet, 2003, OL 19289916M – via Open Library
- Pablo Medina (2004). "Tampa Cubans and the Culture of Exile". Antioch Review. 62 (4): 635–643. doi:10.2307/4614730. JSTOR 4614730.
- Kevin M. McCarthy (2007). "Tampa". African American Sites in Florida. Pineapple Press Inc. p. 99+. ISBN 978-1-56164-385-1.
- Steve Rajtar (2007). Guide to Historic Tampa. The History Press. ISBN 978-1-59629-253-6.
- Cameron B. LeBlanc (2009). "Preserving the Memory of Ybor City, Florida". Southern Spaces. doi:10.18737/M7K890.
