= Timeline of Orlando, Florida =

The following is a timeline of the history of the city of Orlando, Florida, United States.

== 19th century ==
- 1843 - Orlando settled as "Jernigan"
- 1875
  - Town of Orlando incorporated.
  - William Jackson Brack becomes mayor.
- 1878 - Orange County Reporter newspaper begins publication.
- 1880
  - South Florida Railroad begins operating.
  - Mount Zion Missionary Baptist Church established.
- 1884 - Orange County Jail built.
- 1886
  - Orlando Black (school) opens.
  - Orlando Street Railway begins operating (approximate date).
  - English Club formed.
- 1889 - Church Street Station built.
- 1891 - St. James Cathedral built.
- 1892
  - Courthouse built.
  - Lake Eola Park established.
- 1900 - Florida Christian Recorder newspaper begins publication.

== 20th century ==
=== 1900s-1960s ===
- 1905 - City Hall built.
- 1910 - Population: 3,894.
- 1913 - Grand Theater opens.
- 1914 - Commission form of government effected.
- 1918 - Orange General Hospital opens.
- 1920 - Population: 9,282.
- 1921
  - Beacham Theater opens.
  - Jones High School active.
- 1923
  - Orlando Utilities Commission established; municipal electric plant begins operating.
  - Albertson Public Library opens.
  - Angebilt Hotel opened on March 14.
- 1924
  - Edgewater Heights, Lorna Doone Park, and Orwin Manor become part of Orlando.
  - WDBO radio begins broadcasting.
  - Orlando Museum of Art founded.
  - Orange Court Hotel built.
- 1925 - Glendonjo Park and Spring Lake Terrace become part of Orlando.
- 1926
  - Country Club Estates, Ivanhoe Plaza, Oakhurst Subdivision, Orlando Highlands, Princeton Court, and Silver Lake Park become part of Orlando.
  - Atlantic Coast Line Railroad station, Cathedral Church of St. Luke, and Municipal Auditorium built.
  - Well'sbuilt Hotel in business.
- 1927 - Orange County Courthouse built.
- 1928 - Orlando Municipal Airport begins operating.
- 1930 - Population: 27,330.
- 1934 - Orlando Dixie Sun newspaper begins publication.
- 1936
  - Orlando Stadium opens.
  - Cypress Gardens opens in nearby Winter Haven.
- 1940 - Orlando Army Air Base established.
- 1943
  - Pinecastle Army Airfield in operation.
  - DDT pesticide "Neocide" developed in United States Department of Agriculture lab in Orlando.
- 1945 - Negro Chamber of Commerce established.
- 1946 - Ben White Raceway opens.
- 1949 - Gatorland opens.
- 1950
  - Population: 52,367.
  - Florida Symphony Orchestra established
- 1952 - William R. Boone High School and Edgewater High School are built.
- 1954
  - WDBO-TV (television) begins broadcasting.
  - Bishop Moore High School built.
- 1956 - Colonial Plaza shopping centre in business.
- 1957
  - Orange County Historical Commission established.
  - Martin Company missile manufactory begins operating near Orlando.
  - Interstate 4 highway constructed.
- 1958 - WLOF-TV (television) begins broadcasting.
- 1960
  - Central Florida Museum opens.
  - Population: 88,135.
- 1961 - Harry P. Leu Gardens deeded to city.
- 1963 - UCF founded in East Orlando
- 1967
  - Carl T. Langford becomes mayor of Orlando.
  - Disney-controlled City of Bay Lake and City of Reedy Creek incorporated near Orlando.
- 1968
  - Florida Technological University opens.
  - Naval Training Center Orlando and Roman Catholic Diocese of Orlando established.

=== 1970s-1990s ===
- 1970
  - Lake Highland Preparatory School founded.
  - Population: 99,006 city; 344,311 county.
  - University Drive-In cinema built.
- 1971
  - Disney World in business.
  - Historical Society of Central Florida headquartered in Orlando.
- 1973
  - Orlando Fashion Square Mall opens
  - Sentinel Star newspaper began publication.
  - SeaWorld theme park in business.
- 1974
  - East-West Expressway constructed.
  - Disney's Discovery Island in business.
- 1975 - Metropolitan Orlando Women's Political Caucus and Orlando Lutheran Academy founded.
- 1976
  - Orlando International Airport in operation.
  - Harbor House of Central Florida founded as Spouse Abuse, Inc.
- 1977
  - Orlando Regional Medical Center established.
  - Wet 'n Wild Orlando theme park in business.
- 1979
  - Orlando Opera incorporated.
  - Basilica of Mary (church) built.
- 1980
  - July: Racial unrest.
  - Bill Frederick becomes mayor.
  - Population: 128,291 city; 471,016 county.
- 1981 - Bill McCollum becomes U.S. representative for Florida's 5th congressional district.
- 1982
  - Second Harvest Food Bank of Central Florida established.
  - Epcot theme park in business in nearby Lake Buena Vista.
- 1983 - Orange County Convention Center opens.
- 1984 - Orlando Science Center active.
- 1986 - The Peabody Orlando hotel and Disney's Living Seas in business.
- 1987 - Dr. Phillips High School opens.
- 1989
  - Orlando-UCF Shakespeare Festival begins.
  - Orlando Arena (later the Amway Arena) opens.
  - Orlando Magic begin play.
- 1990
  - Universal Orlando theme park in business.
  - Orlando Weekly newspaper begins publication.
  - Population: 164,693 city; 677,491 county.
  - Zora Neale Hurston Festival begins in nearby Eatonville.
- 1991
  - UCF Arena opens.
  - Orlando Predators football team formed.
- 1992
  - Cypress Creek High School and Orlando Philharmonic Orchestra established.
  - Orlando International Fringe Theater Festival begins.
- 1993
  - Naval Air Warfare Center Training Systems Division in operation.
  - Glenda Hood becomes mayor.
  - Florida Symphony Orchestra ceases operations
- 1994
  - June–July: Some 1994 FIFA World Cup games held in Orlando.
  - Mormon temple built.
- 1996 - City website online (approximate date).
- 1998
  - Muvico Pointe cinema in business.
  - Mennello Museum opens.
  - Disney's Animal Kingdom theme park in business.
- 1999 - Cinemark Festival Bay Mall (cinema) in business.

== 21st century ==
- 2001 - Olympia High School established
- 2002 - Millenia Mall in business.
- 2003
  - Freedom High School established.
  - Buddy Dyer becomes mayor.
- 2004 - Hurricane Charley directly strikes Orlando area with wind gusts to at least 105 mph Over 60% of Orlando loses power.
- 2007 - CFE Arena opens.
- 2010
  - Amway Center event venue opens.
  - Orlando City Soccer Club formed.
  - Population: 238,300.
- 2011 - Daniel Webster becomes U.S. representative for Florida's 8th congressional district.
- 2015
  - Orlando Eye ferris wheel built.
  - Population: 270,917 (estimate).
- 2016 - Murder of Christina Grimmie and Orlando nightclub shooting
- 2017 - Universal's Volcano Bay in business

== See also ==
- Orlando history
- List of mayors of Orlando, Florida
- List of amusement parks in Greater Orlando
- Timelines of other cities in the Central Florida area of Florida: Clearwater, Lakeland, Largo, St. Petersburg, Tampa

== Bibliography ==
- John R. Richards, ed. (1886). "Orlando". Florida State Gazetteer and Business Directory. New York: South Publishing Company. OCLC 12186532.
- Orlando, Florida: Indelible Photographs, Orlando: H.A. Abercromby, 1890, OL 23366645M
- "Orlando", Handy Guide to the Southeastern States, Chicago: Rand, McNally & Co., 1899 – via Internet Archive
- "Orlando". Florida Gazetteer and Business Directory 1907-1908. R. L. Polk & Co. 1907.
- "Orlando". Florida State Gazetteer and Business Directory. R. L. Polk & Co. 1918.
- Federal Writers' Project (1939), "Orlando", Florida; a Guide to the Southernmost State, American Guide Series, ISBN 9781623760090
- E. Bacon. 1977. Orlando: A centennial history. Chuluota, Fla.: Mickler House.
- L. Argrett Jr. 1991. A history of the black community of Orlando, Florida. Fort Bragg, Calif.: Cypress House Press.
- Kevin Archer (1997). "The Limits to the Imagineered City: Sociospatial Polarization in Orlando". Economic Geography. 73 (3): 322–336. doi:10.2307/144487. JSTOR 144487.
- Walt Disney World & Orlando, Frommer, 1998, OL 9936049M
- Married to the Mouse: Walt Disney World and Orlando. By Richard E. Foglesong. (New Haven: Yale University Press, 2001).
- Walt Disney World & Orlando for Dummies 2004, For Dummies, 2003, OL 8042293M
- Wendy Taylor (2003), Orlando & Central Florida, Lonely Planet, OL 19289916M
- Geraldine Fortenberry Thompson (2003). Orlando, Florida. Black America. Charleston, South Carolina: Arcadia.
- Tana Mosier Porter (2004). "Segregation and Desegregation in Parramore: Orlando's African American Community". Florida Historical Quarterly. 82 (3): 289–312. JSTOR 30149526.
- Tana Mosier Porter (2009). "Orlando". Historic Orange County: The Story of Orlando and Orange County. HPN Books. ISBN 978-1-893619-99-9.
- Stephanie Gaub Antequino; Tana Mosier Porter (2012). Lost Orlando. Arcadia Publishing. ISBN 978-0-7385-9173-5.
- Jeffrey C. Billman (October 29, 2013), "13 things you should know about Orlando history", Orlando Weekly
- American Cities Project (November 11, 2013). "Orlando". America's Big Cities in Volatile Times: City Profiles. Washington, DC: Pew Charitable Trusts.
