= History of St. Petersburg, Florida =

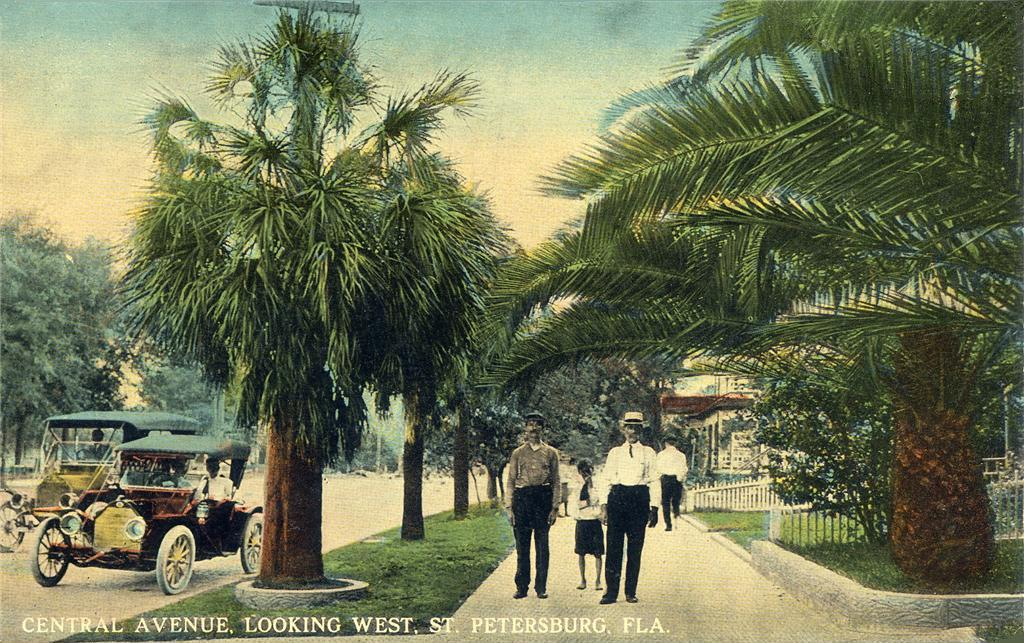
Central Avenue c. 1910

This region of Pinellas was first settled in the 1830s and 1840s by Odet Phillippe, a French Huguenot from Charleston, SC, along with the McMullen Family from Quitman, Georgia and the British Richard Booth family who planted citrus groves and raised cattle. Following the Civil War, during the Reconstruction era, the city was founded by John C. Williams, formerly of Detroit, who purchased the land in 1876, and by Peter Demens, who was instrumental in bringing the terminus of the Orange Belt Railway there in 1888. St. Petersburg was incorporated on February 29, 1892, when it had a population of only some 300 people.

It was named after Saint Petersburg, Russia, where Peter Demens had spent half of his youth. A local legend says that John C. Williams and Peter Demens flipped a coin to see who would have the honor of naming the city. Peter Demens won and named the city after his home, while John C. Williams named the first hotel after his birthplace, Detroit (a hotel built by Demens). The Detroit Hotel still exists downtown, but has been turned into a condominium. The oldest running hotels are the historic Cordova Inn, built in 1921, formally Hotel Cordova and The Heritage Hotel, built in 1926.

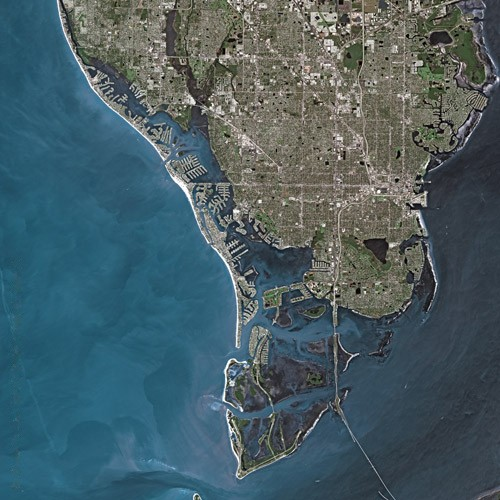
St. Petersburg seen from Spot satellite

Philadelphia publisher F. A. Davis turned on St. Petersburg's first electrical service in 1897 and its first trolley service in 1904. The city's first major industry was born in 1899 when Henry W. Hibbs (1862–1942), a native of Newport, North Carolina, established his wholesale fish business at the end of the railroad pier, which extended out to the shipping channel. Within a year, Hibbs Fish Company was shipping more than 1,000 pounds (450 kg) of fish each day.

Dredging of a deeper shipping channel from 1906 to 1908 opened St. Petersburg to larger shipping. Further dredging improved the port facilities through the 1910s. By then the city's population had quadrupled to 4,127.

In 1914, airplane service across Tampa Bay from St. Petersburg to Tampa and back was initiated, generally considered the first scheduled commercial airline flight. The company name was the St. Petersburg-Tampa Airboat Line, and the pilot was Tony Jannus, flying a Benoist XIV flying boat. The Tony Jannus Award is presented annually for outstanding achievement in the airline industry. Jannus Live, a local music/entertainment venue on Central Avenue in downtown, is also named after him.

The city population continued to multiply during the 20th century, booming in the 1940s and 1950s and through the 1970s as the town became a popular retirement destination for Americans from midwestern cities, reaching 238,647 in the 1980 census. By that time, however, the population had leveled off, and has grown by only 10,000 since then. In the decade from 2000 to 2010, the population of the city dropped by approximately 4000 residents, while in the same period the population of Florida increased by over two and a half million residents.

== See also ==
- Timeline of St. Petersburg, Florida

== Bibliography ==
- Arsenault, Raymond (1996). St. Petersburg and the Florida Dream 1888-1950. Gainesville, Florida: University Press of Florida.
- Ayers, R. Wayne (2001). Images of America: St. Petersburg The Sunshine City. Charleston, South Carolina: Arcadia Publishing.
- Buckley, James (1983). Street Railways of St. Petersburg, Florida. Forty Fort, Pennsylvania: Harold Cox.
- Federal Writer’s Project (1939). Florida: A Guide to the Southernmost State. New York, New York: Oxford University Press.
- Fuller, Walter P. (1972). St. Petersburg and Its People. St. Petersburg, Florida: Great Outdoors Publishing Company.
- Grismer, Karl (1948). The Story of St. Petersburg. St. Petersburg, Florida: P.K. Smith and Company.
- Hartzell, Scott Taylor (2002). Voices of America St. Petersburg An Oral History. St. Petersburg, Florida: Arcadia Publishing.
- Pierce, Robert N. (1993). A Sacred Trust Nelson Poynter and the St. Petersburg Times. Gainesville, Florida: University Press of Florida.
- Stanton, Robert (2006). Streetcar to the Jungle: Trolleys in the Streets of St. Petersburg. Seminole, Florida: Self-published.
- Stephenson, Robert Bruce (1997). Visions of Eden: Environmentalism, Urban Planning and City Building in St. Petersburg, Florida, 1900-1995. Columbus, Ohio: Ohio State University Press.
- Wilson, Jon (2013). The Golden Era in St. Petersburg Postwar Prosperity in the Sunshine City. Charleston, South Carolina: History Press.
