= Orange County Regional History Center =

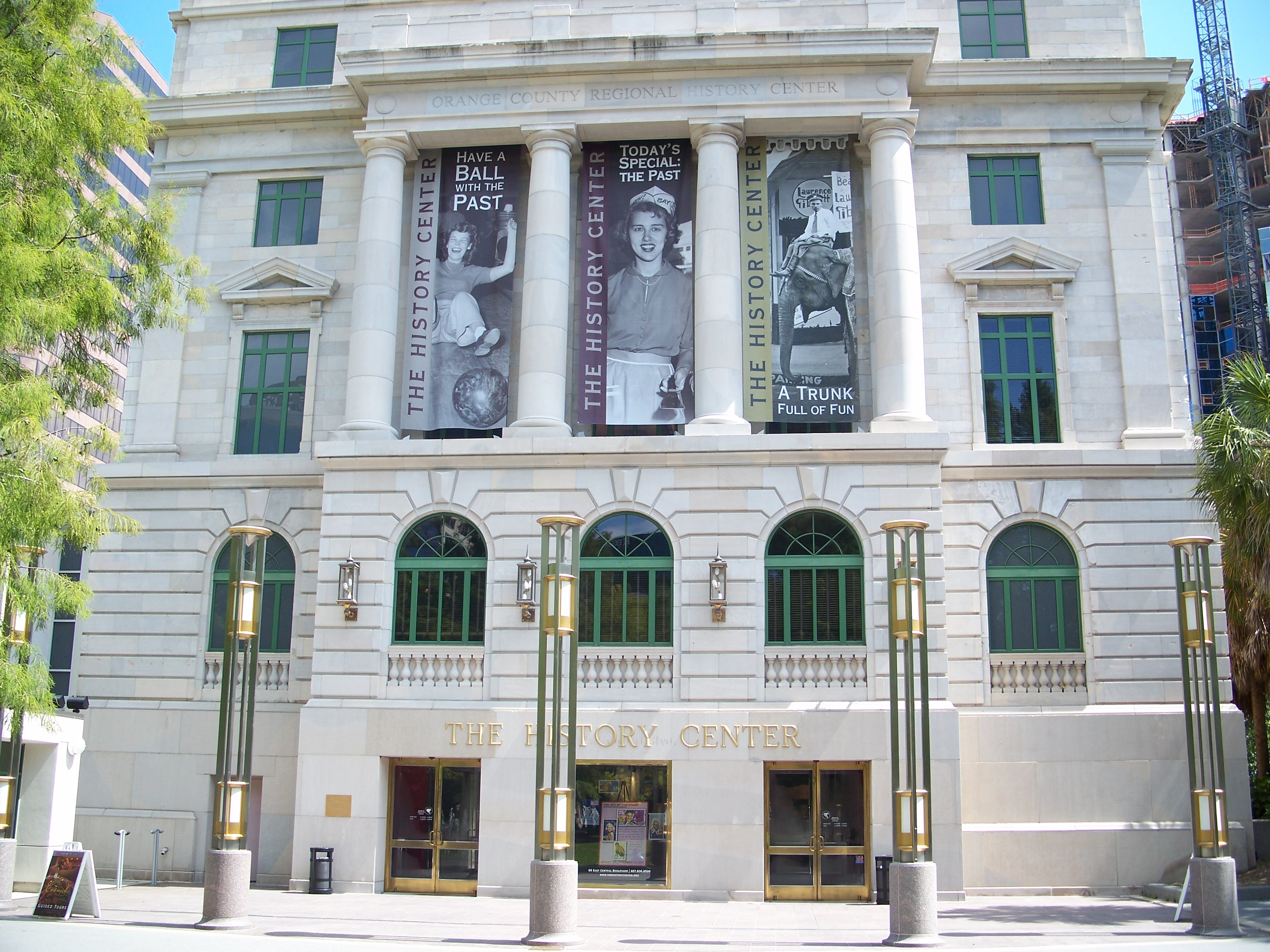

- Location within Florida
- Established: 1942
- Location: 65 East Central Boulevard; Orlando, Florida
- Coordinates: 28.543127°N 81.377916°W
- Type: History museum
- Director: Azela Santana
- Website: www.thehistorycenter.org

The Orange County Regional History Center is a private non-profit history museum located in downtown Orlando, Florida, United States. Located in the historic Orange County Courthouse, the five-story museum consists of exhibits presenting local and regional history starting from 2,000 years ago.

== History ==
In 1892, a red-brick courthouse was built in the newly established city limits of Orlando. In 1927, a neoclassical building, now the current home of the History Center, was added and became the main courthouse. When the red-brick courthouse was demolished in 1957, the Board of County Commissioners established a historical commission to carry on the work. In 1960 a Courthouse annex was built next to the 1927 Courthouse. In 1976 the Orange County Historical Museum in Orlando's Loch Haven Park opened and became the precursor to the History Center. In 1989, the Courthouse annex closed due to asbestos. In 1995, Orange County debuted its current, high-rise courthouse, and a task force of community leaders unanimously recommended that the 1927 courthouse become a larger, regional history museum. In 1998 the Courthouse annex was demolished and Heritage Park was built on the site. The Orange County Regional History Center opened in September 2000.

The History Center is housed in the historic 1927 Orange County courthouse and home to the Historical Society of Central Florida’s collections. The five-story building was built for nearly $1 million by Orlando's first registered architect, Murry S. King. Construction began in May 1926, and the building was dedicated on October 12, 1927. After King's death in 1926, work on the building was completed by his son, James B. King. The jail was housed on the top floor with quarters for the jailor and his wife, an infirmary.

== The Joseph L. Brechner Research Center ==
The Orange County Regional History Center has its own library and archives, located in the Joseph L. Brechner Research Center, which is free to the public by appointment.

The Joseph L. Brechner Research Center, located on the fifth floor of the History Center, was created through a donation from the late Marion Brody Brechner in honor of her husband, an award-winning journalist and freedom-of-information advocate.

The Brechner Research Center houses the special collections of the Historical Society of Central Florida, a research library, and archives. The Research Center's library and archives feature more than 5,000 volumes.

== Exhibits ==
The History Center has both traveling exhibitions and permanent exhibitions on display. The museum collections are housed throughout three of the five floors of the building with the Atrium and Emporium Gift Shop on the first floor and the Joseph L. Brechner Research Center and Library on the fifth floor.

== Educational programming ==
- History on the Go-this free program is offered to Orange County Public Schools. These programs focus on Central Florida history and are performed at the schools. Presentations include plays and puppet shows as well as curriculum materials for teachers designed to meet Sunshine State Standards
- Home School Days-this program is specifically designed for home school students and their families.
- School Break Camps- they offer camps during school breaks and summer. Holiday Break Camp is a four-day program offered during Winter break for kids 6 to 10 years old. Summer Camp is a nine-week program for kids entering Grades 1-9.
