= Timeline of Largo, Florida history =

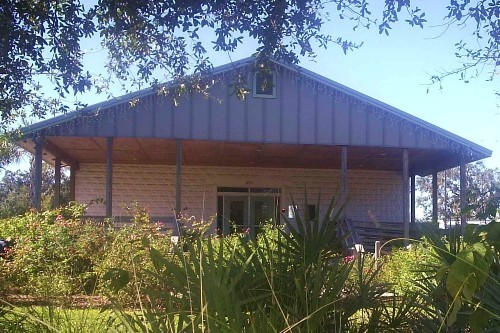
The Largo Area Historical Society meets at the Largo Feed Store at Largo Central Park

This is a timeline of history of the city of Largo, Florida, United States.

== 1513–1841 ==
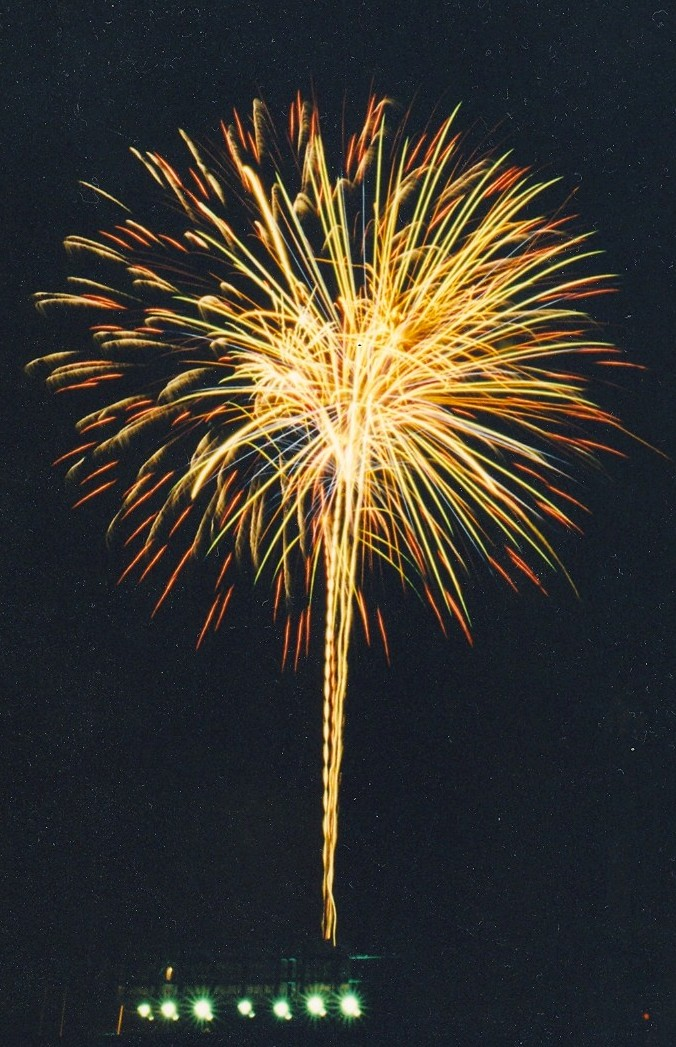
Fireworks, Central Park, Largo, Florida. July 4, 2006

- 1513 – March 27 Ponce de Leon discovers Florida.
- 1515–1519 Spanish explorers visit Pinellas barrier islands while trading with Tocobaga.
- 1528 Panfilo de Narvaez expedition explores the Pinellas Peninsula.
- 1539 Hernando de Soto expedition names present Tampa Bay "La Bahia de Espiritu Santo."
- 1702–1713 Queen Anne's War. Tocobaga virtually annihilated. English raids reach Tampa Bay. Pinellas largely deserted.
- 1739–1748 War of Jenkins' Ear. English mapping expeditions visit Pinellas Peninsula.
- 1757 Spanish expedition renames Tampa Bay "La Bahia de San Fernando", after the Spanish king. Names entrance to Tampa Bay "La Punta de Pinal de Jimenez" (Point of Pines).
- 1763 Spain cedes Florida to England at end of the French and Indian War.
- 1783 Treaty of Paris (1783) ends American Revolutionary War. England cedes Florida to Spain.
- 1817–1818 First Seminole War.
- 1821 Spain cedes Florida to United States.
- 1824 U S Army establishes Fort Brooke (later to become Tampa, Florida.)
- 1834 Territorial Legislature establishes Hillsborough County, Florida.
- 1835–1842 Second Seminole War.
- 1842 Armed Occupation Act provides for land grants in unsettled parts of Florida.

== 1841–1902 ==
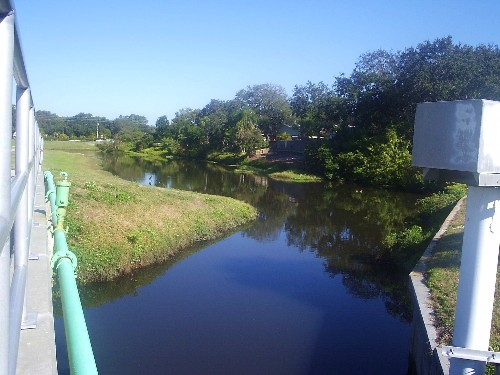
Section of McKay Creek just south of 8th (Taylor) Avenue SW.

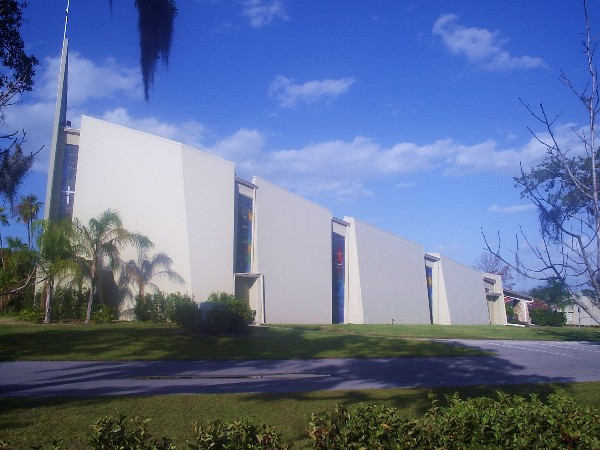
Anona Methodist Church

- 1843 Three claims filed under the Armed Occupation Act in Largo Area, including that of Charles, George, and Alexander McKay.
- 1844 Surveyor notes Lake Tolulu (later Lake Largo).
- 1845 Florida Statehood.
- 1848 Great Gale of 1848 wreaks havoc on local settlements. Water rises high enough to connect Gulf with Tampa Bay across Pinellas Peninsula.
- 1852 Daniel McMullen homesteads in Largo area.
- 1854 Members of McMullen family establish First Free School.
- 1861–1865 American Civil War. Many Largo residents leave area. Some join the Cow Cavalry.
- 1874 Anona Elementary founded (oldest school in Pinellas County).
- 1882 Anona Methodist Church established. Hamilton Disston purchases vast landholdings in Florida, including portions of mid-Pinellas and with it, Lake Tolulu. Lake Tolulu is renamed "Lake Largo" by Disston's agent.
- 1888 Orange Blossom Railroad arrives. Largo receives its name. September 4 M. Joel McMullen becomes Largo's first postmaster. First post office opens in home of Gideon Blitch.
- 1897 Mrs A K Meigs donates Meigs cemetery to become Largo Cemetery.
- 1902 John Stansell Taylor builds his first citrus packing house, foreshadowing the importance citrus will have for Largo.

== 1905–1945 ==
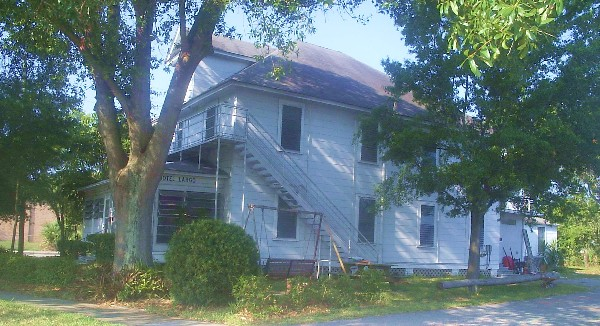
The Largo Hotel

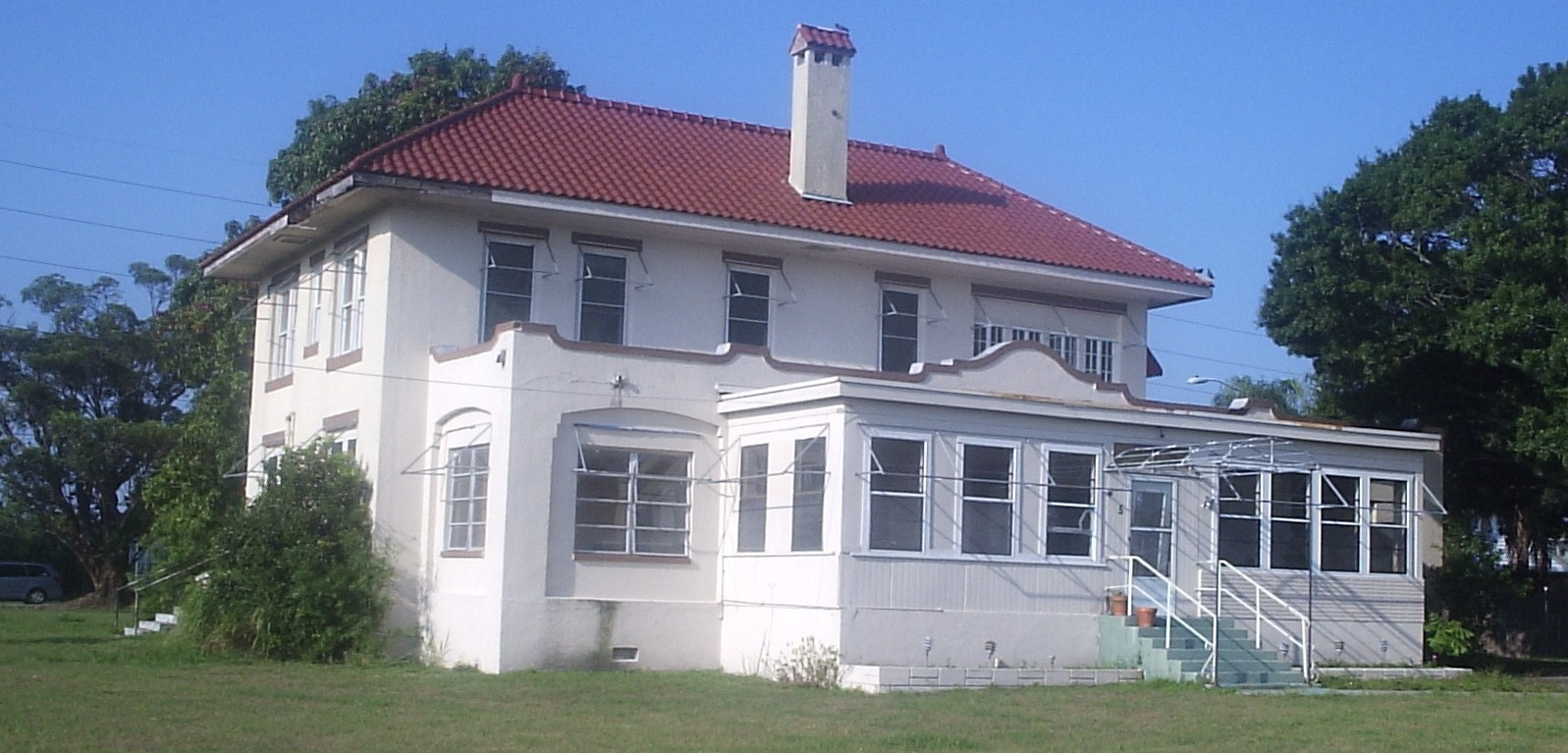
Home of Senator John S. Taylor built around 1913 at the corner of 8th Avenue S.W. and 4th Street S.W.

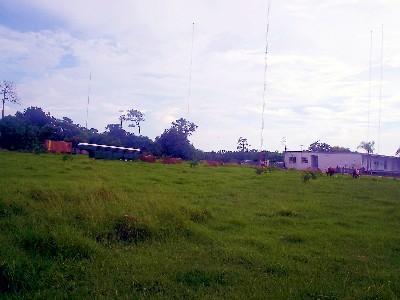
Remnant of pasture at 8th Avenue SW and Donegan Road.

- 1905 Town of Largo incorporated. M. Joel McMullen Becomes Largo's first mayor.
- 1907 Pinellas "Declaration of Independence" marks major milestone on the road to creating Pinellas County. Largo's first bank opens. Largo hosts rally in favor of independence from Hillsborough County. Louis Johnson becomes mayor.
- 1908 Largo Hotel, Largo's first hotel is built.
- 1909 Pinellas Groves, a development company, develops 20,000 acres (80 km^{2}) of farms in and beyond present day Largo. Seth Brown Mayor till 1911.
- 1910 Largo's population is 291. Work begins on rock road from Clearwater to Largo.
- 1911 John Stansel Taylor is mayor and is succeeded by S. E. Smith. (1911–1913)
- 1912 Pinellas County created. Largo's first public water system begins operations.
- 1913 Largo becomes first town in Pinellas to adopt council-manager form of government. New charter establishes town limits at 9/16th's of a square mile. New charter authorizes city manager to act as police chief.
- 1914
  - Largo Women's Club establishes Largo Public Library. Turner A. Duren mayor.
  - Largo High School established. (public)
- 1915 Largo votes bond issue to build paved roads, town-owned water system and sewers. S. E. Smith mayor.
- 1916 Lake Largo – Cross Bayou drainage project drains Lake Largo and land to the east and south of town. Largo votes bond issue to build paved roads, town-owned water system and sewers. Largo Public Library officially opens with 560 books. Largo becomes bird sanctuary.
- 1920 Largo's population is 599. Cattle industry thrives. B. H. Allen mayor.
- 1921 Citrus City Grower's association organized. William F. Belcher mayor.
- 1923 Robert L. Youngblood mayor.
- 1924 C E Donegan's certified dairy farm. Largo hires police chief and one other officer. Largo High School built on site of what is now the County School Administration Building.
- 1925- May 25 Legislature creates City of Largo. Largo's boundaries extended three miles (5 km) westward into the Gulf. Citrus and turpentine production are important industries.
- 1927 City continues to undertake bond obligations to fund improvements as local economic growth begins to slow. First Largo Fire Station built.
- 1928 Cities accountant recommends refinancing of $1,000,000 in bond debt.
- 1929–1939 Great Depression. Legislative Act of 1925 nullified. Largo reverts to 1913 boundaries and charter. WPA projects create Taylor Lake and Lake Walsingham as well as Auditorium at 4th Street NW and West Bay Drive. John S Taylor builds citrus packing plant at corner of East Bay Drive and Missouri Avenue.
- 1930 Largo's population is 1,429.
- 1940 Largo's population is 1,031.
- 1941–1945 World War II.

== 1946–1970 ==
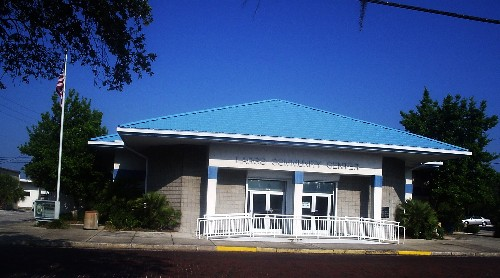
The Largo Community Center was first built in the 1930s. The front portion was rebuilt after a fire destroyed the auditorium on Thanksgiving Day 1988.

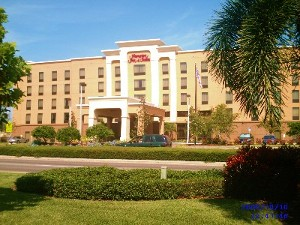
Hampton Inn built in 2005 on the site of the Largo Police station built in 1976 on West Bay Drive, across from Largo Central Park.

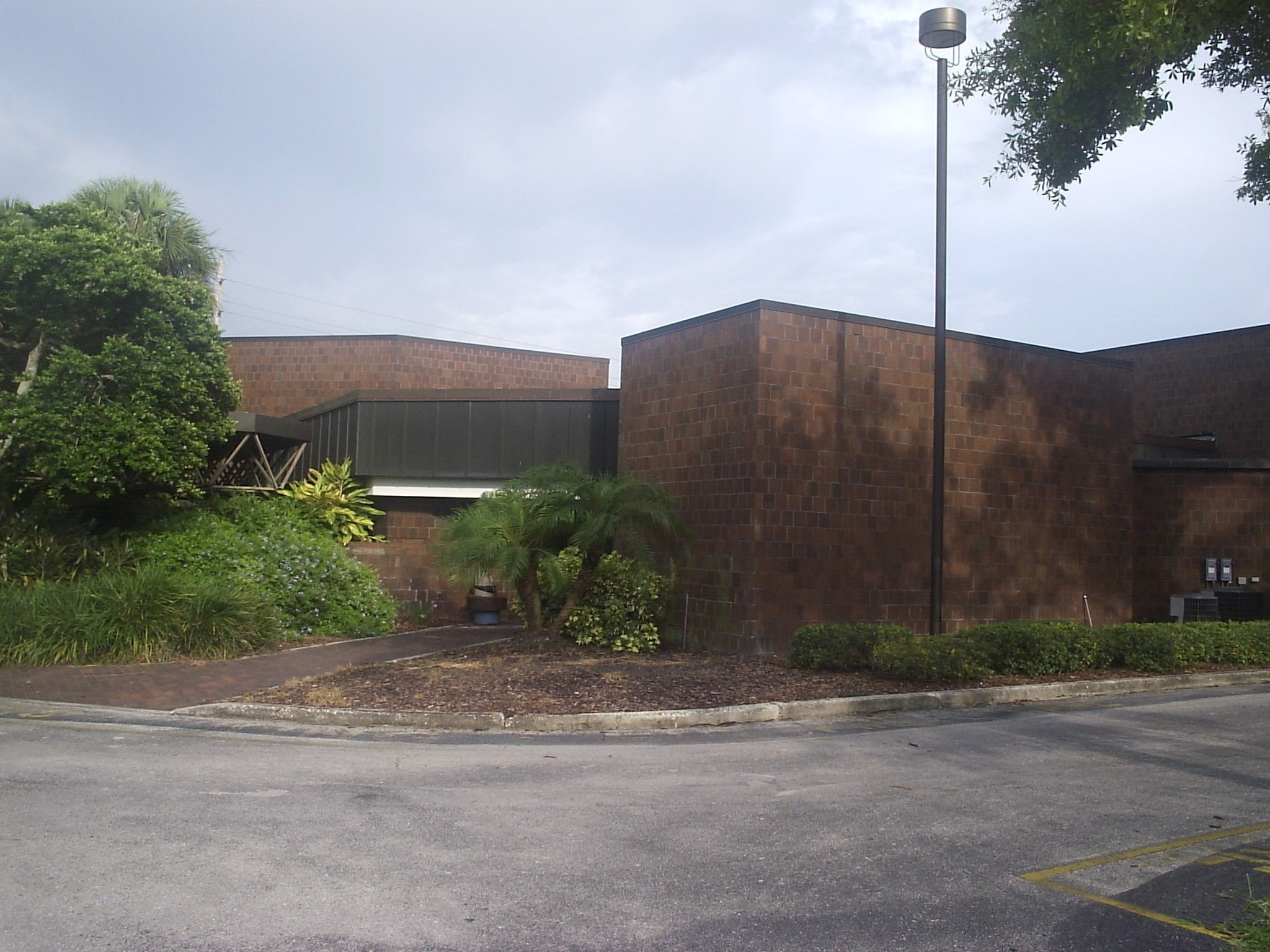
1977 Largo Library building in July 2006.

- 1946 Largo Public Library has more than 3,000 books. Supreme Court orders Largo to pay bond debts resulting in 37 mil ad valorem tax rate.
- 1948 Largo Theater on West Bay Drive. Largo gets its first police car. Police department begins to expand.
- 1950 Cigarette tax eases financial burden. Population 1,547. Police operate out of one room police station.
- 1952 Pinellas Central Bank (later, Southeast First Bank of Largo) opens—Largo's first bank since the Great Depression. Mildred Helms Elementary opens.
- 1954 Pinellas Shopping Center opens.
- 1955 Annexation referendum results in tripling of Largo's area and population.
- 1957 Largo High School opens new campus on Missouri Avenue.
- 1958 Largo Public Library has 1450 patrons and a circulation of 14,000.
- 1959 Largo Police crisis. In a closed session, the Commission votes 3–2 to allow the City Manager to fire the Police Chief. Public uproar results in the recall of those commissioners who voted to fire the Police Chief. The new Commission fires the City Manager and rehires the Police Chief. Citizen's committee builds new police station and donates it to the City.
- 1960 Largo's population is 5,302. Largo begins construction on new Library building. Largo Recreation Department formed.
- 1962 Town Hall built at 296 1st Avenue SW. Largo Library building opens.
- 1962- December – 1963- January Worst freeze in over 100 years, combined with urbanization and rising property tax assessments, severely stresses citrus industry.
- 1965 Largo proclaimed "Clean Air Capital" by Chamber of Commerce.
- 1966 Largo Police Department has 22 officers.
- 1968 Last year ad valorem taxes levied until 1972. Largo Recreation department has two facilities—the Largo Club Center and the Auditorium built during the Depression by the WPA.
- 1969 Largo Public Library's circulation is ~125,000. February 11* Greater Largo Recreation Complex and Park Development Board appointed.
- 1970 Largo's population is 24,230. Largo Fire Department begins phase out of volunteer fire fighters.

== 1971 – 1999 ==
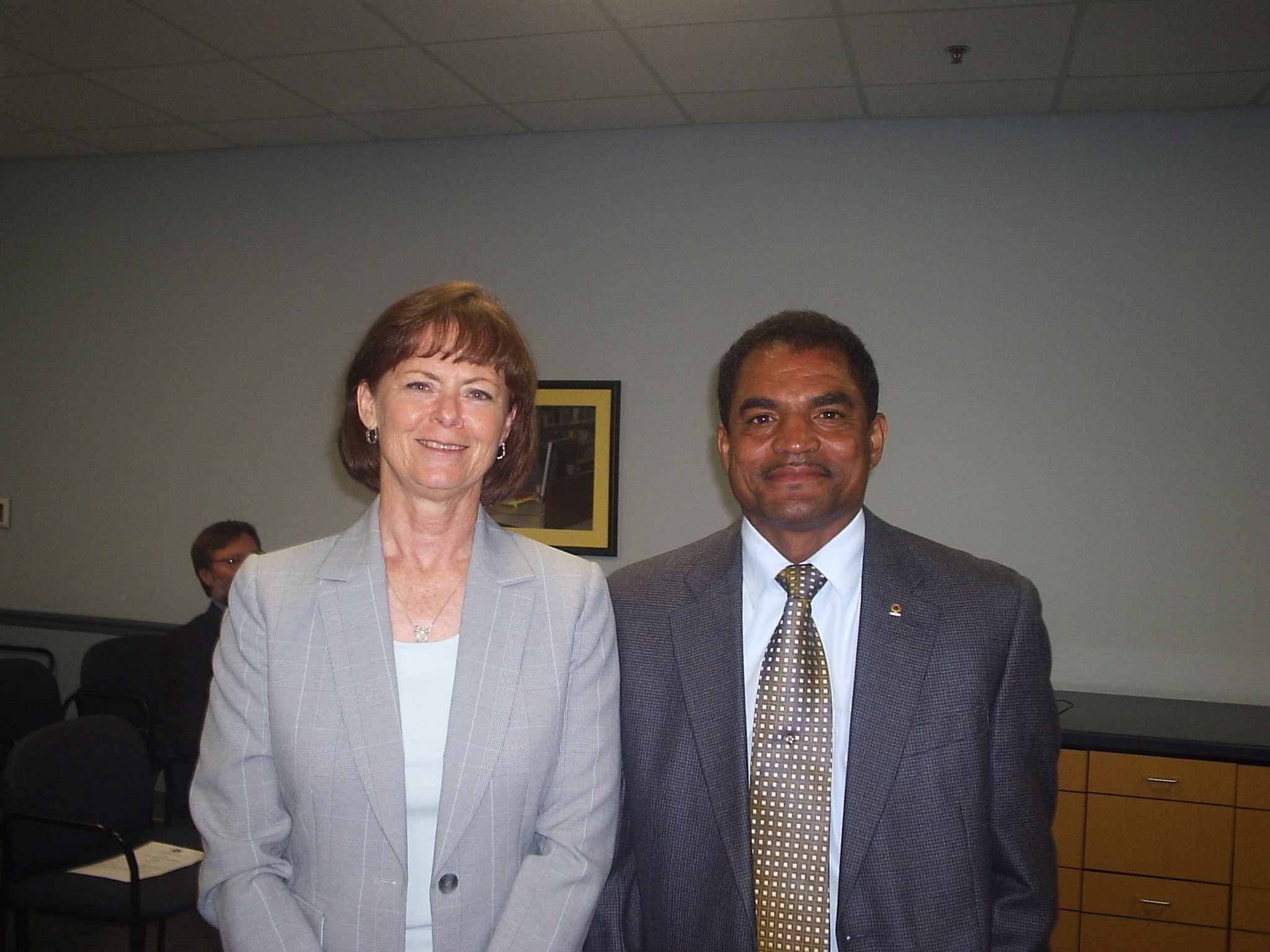
Gerard and Woods

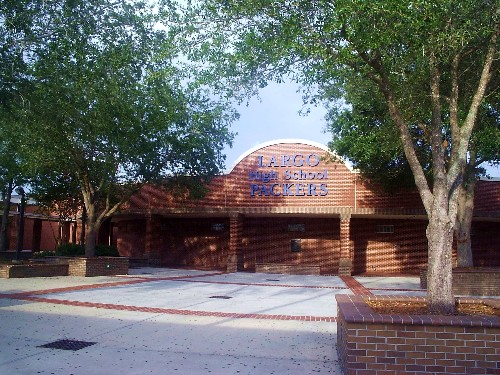
Largo High School in July 2006.

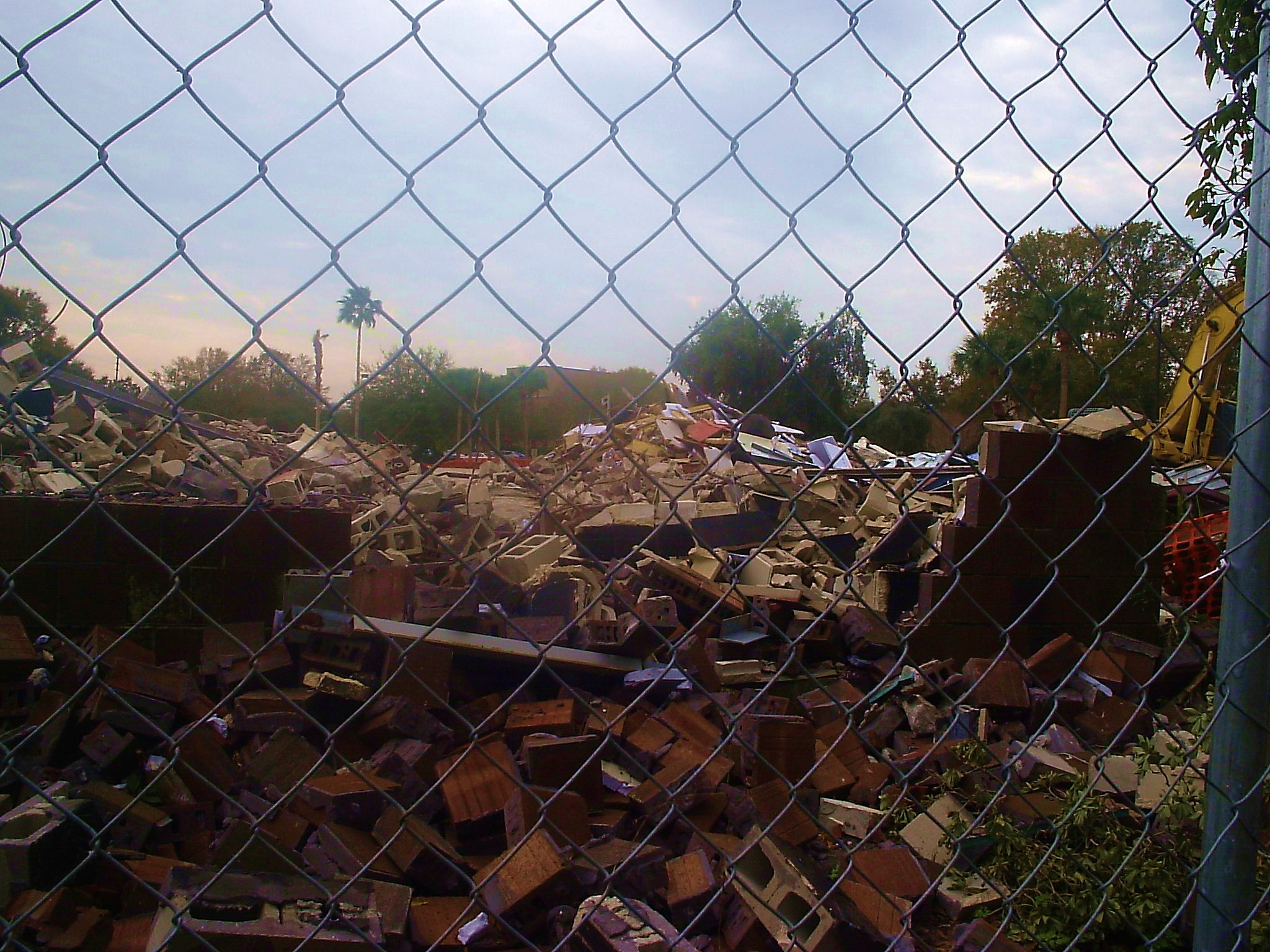
The 1977 Largo Library was demolished to make way room for a more modern arts and recreation center.

- 1972 Highland Recreation Complex dedicated.
- 1974
  - May 7 Largo adopts a new charter creating City of Largo. Ad valorem tax rate is 1.29 mils. John A Jenkins donates land on East Bay Drive and east of Third Street SE for new library building. Largo Public Library circulation is about 180,000.
  - Largo High School's Band of Gold and former members form a community Band of Gold and, under the guidance of band director Robert R. Cotter, wins two gold medals at the World Music Competition in Kerkrade, Holland. Town of Largo comes out to greet the band upon their return with a motorcade from Tampa Airport and celebration back at Largo HS.
- 1975 Largo Recreation Department grows to 211 activities with 267,00 participants.
- 1976 Largo Fire Department grows to 60 employees. Police administration building at 100 East Bay dedicated.
- 1977 The Library moves to the site at 351 East Bay Drive donated by John A Jenkins with 30,000 books.
- 1978 Largo High School's Band of Gold, under the guidance of band director Robert R. Cotter, wins gold medals at World Music Competition in Kerkrade, Holland.
- 1980 Largo's population is 58,977.
- 1984 Southwest Recreation Complex dedicated.
- 1995 Largo Central Park opens on site of former John S Taylor packing plant.

== 2000 - present ==
- 2000 Charter amendment adopted to end annexation wars among municipalities and county. (Annexation).
- 2002 The 1977 library building is deemed inadequate for forecast growth. Construction of 90,000-square-foot (8,400 m^{2}) library becomes campaign issue.
- 2004 Florida is struck by four hurricanes that largely miss Largo. Minor damage slightly delays construction of new library.
- 2005 The new 90,000-square-foot (8,400 m^{2}) library opens at 120 Central Park Drive with more than 200,000 items. The Largo Fire Department has 140 employees and operates five fire stations.
- 2006 Charter amendments pass. Pat Gerard, Largo's first female mayor, elected. Rodney J. Woods, Largo's first commissioner of African-American descent, elected. Largo wins legal victory when court rules Pinellas County acted wrongly in limiting the annexation authority of municipalities. (Lindberg)
- 2007
  - City demolishes 1977 library building because refurbishment would cost more than building something else. City manager Steve Stanton announces his intention to undergo sex reassignment therapy, and is consequently dismissed.
  - Largo Fire Chief Jeff Bullock resigns. Is replaced by Mike Wallace.
- 2009 Former Mayor Bob Jackson won't sue Largo to get name on ballot, and Mayor Pat Gerard 'will be automatically re-elected for another three-year term with Jackson's disqualification.'
- 2012
  - Largo and Pinellas County designate a large section of Ulmerton Road as a Florida Brownfield area.
  - Pinellas County begins construction on the new $81 million Public Safety Complex on Ulmerton Road in Largo.
  - Largo residents approve referendum for the City to enact an Economic Development Ad Valorem Tax Abatement Incentive for businesses.
  - Florida Blue purchases Diagnostic Clinic Medical Group
- 2013
  - Downtown Largo Master Stormwater Ponds retrofitted and a new integrated walking park was added to enhance the area.
  - Largo High School adds an International Baccalaureate (IB) Diploma Program. They are the third high school in Pinellas to offer the program.
  - The City of Largo opens the new $17 million Highland Recreation Complex.
  - Police Chief John Carroll retires and Jeff Undestad named successor.
  - Largo Skate park opens adjacent to the Bayhead Action Park in downtown Largo.
  - Fire Chief Mike Wallace announces retirement from Largo Fire Rescue.
  - In September, Shelby Willis appointed Fire Chief for Largo. First female for Largo and the only female fire chief in Pinellas County.
- 2014
  - Largo makes improvements to their recycling program by introducing Mixed Recycling.
  - Tech Data builds a new 45,000 square foot expansion to their headquarter operations in Largo.
  - Woody Brown becomes Largo's new Mayor.
  - Largo begins the multi-million dollar reconstruction of the city's sewer and stormwater systems.
  - largo named the 4th Best Place to Retire by Livability.com
  - Gateway North a 342-unit Class A apartment complex is completed in Largo.
- 2015
  - Largo named one of the 2015 Best Towns to Live in Florida.
  - Largo Medical Center opens the Transplant Institute of Florida. The Institute is the first in Pinellas County and conducts kidney transplants.
  - Nerdwallet.com ranks Largo #4 in the Best Places to Start a Business in Florida.
- 2016
  - Norton "Mac" Craig retires and Henry Schubert becomes next City Manager for Largo.
  - Forbes "25 Best Places to Retire" announces that Largo is #4 on their list.
- 2017
  - GoodCall.com ranked Largo as the #41st "2017 Best Cities for New Grads"
  - Vology locates their headquarter operations to the City of Largo.
  - newly constructed Class A apartment complex "158 Ridge" opens in downtown Largo.
  - Largo adds first all electric vehicle to their fleet.
  - Largo ranked #2 in the "Top 10 Boomtowns" of 2017 by SmartAsset.com

== See also ==
- Timelines of other cities in the Central Florida area of Florida: Clearwater, Lakeland, Orlando, St. Petersburg, Tampa

== Sources ==
- About Largo Page. December 18, 2005.
- Annexation, May 23, 2006 Largo City Council work session agenda.
- About Pinellas County. Online. December 18, 2005.
- City of Largo Staff. Citizen's Academy Handbook. Largo. 2003.
- Coughlin, Leo. Around Here Clearwater Gazette. Online. June 23, 2005.
- Fuller, Walter P. St. Petersburg and its People. Great Outdoors Publishing. St. Petersburg. 1972.
- Helfand, Lorri (2006). "Largo gets new mayor, black commissioner". Saint Petersburg Times. Archived from the original on October 1, 2007.
- Largo Bicentennial Book Committee. (LBBC1979)Largo, then till . . . . Largo Area Historical Society. 1979.
- Largo History Page(LHP) Online. December 18, 2005.
- Largo Area Historical Society. (LAHS From Pines and Palmettos—A portrait of Largo. The Donning Company Publishers. Virginia Beach, Va. 2005.
- Largo Leader Rumors surface about downtown development. June 9, 2006.
- Lindberg, Anne. "Ruling may rekindle turf wars". St. Petersburg Times. Archived from the original on October 1, 2007.
- Milanich, Jerald T., Florida Indians and the Invasion from Europe. University Press of Florida: Gainesville. 1995. in Who Were the Tocobago Indians? Online. December 20, 2005.
- New hotel brings hope for progress to Largo
- Pinellas County Planning Department as staff for the Pinellas County Planning Council. (PCPD) Pinellas County Historical Background. No city. No date.
- de Quesada Jr, A.M. and Luisi, Vincent. Images of America Pinellas County. Tempus Publishing. Charleston, SC. 1998.
- Straub, William L. (1929). History of Pinellas County, Florida, narrative and biographical. St. Augustine, Florida: The Record Company. OCLC 1837952.
