= Mazzaro Italian Market =

Italian cuisine market in St. Petersburg, Florida, U.S.

Mazarro Italian Market
- Location: 2909 22nd Ave N, St. Petersburg, FL 33713; St. Petersburg, Florida; 27.792417°N 82.673615°W
- Opening date: 1993
- Days normally open: Monday - Saturday
- Website: http://www.mazzarosmarket.com/
- Interactive map of Mazarro Italian Market

Mazzaro Italian Market (also Mazzaro's Italian Market) is an Italian cuisine fine food market located in St. Petersburg, Florida. Initially established in 1993 as a coffee roaster, but expanded greatly after its initial success. It hosts wine tastings and book signings. It is known for its cheeses, olives, deli sandwiches, bakery items, handmade pastas and pre-made dishes.
