= Old Orange County Courthouse (Florida) =

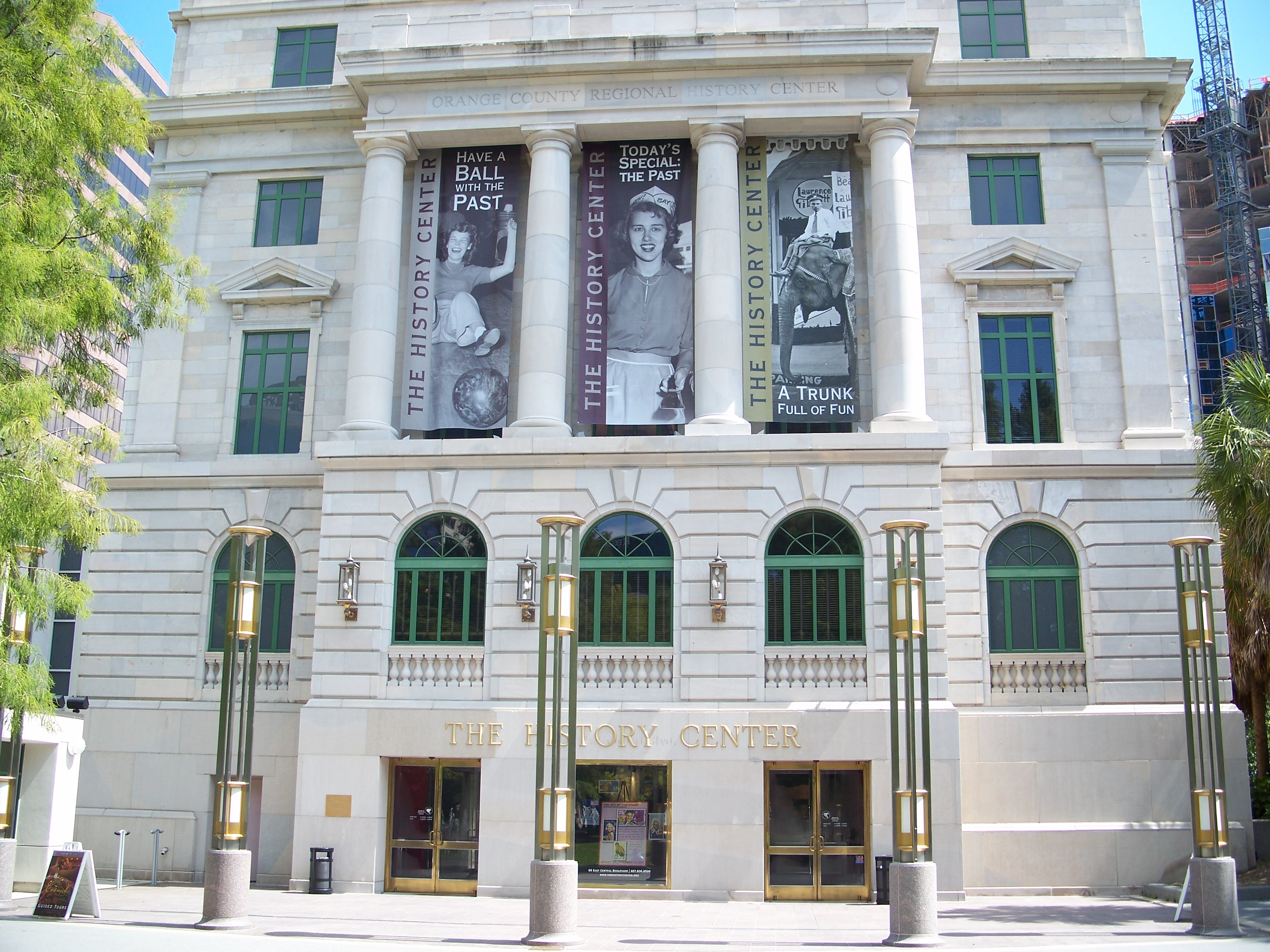
- Interactive map of the Old Orange County Courthouse area

General information
- Architectural style: Beaux Arts
- Location: 65 East Central Boulevard; Orlando, Florida, United States
- Coordinates: 28.542179°N 81.377889°W
- Completed: 1927
- Client: Orange County, Florida

Design and construction
- Architects: Murray S. and James R. King

The old Orange County Courthouse, located in Orlando, Florida, United States, serves as the home of the Historical Society of Central Florida and the Orange County Regional History Center. Constructed in 1927, the Courthouse stands in the vicinity of a number of previous judicial buildings. An earlier courthouse was built in 1892 and demolished in 1957. A Courthouse Annex was also constructed in 1960 which was demolished in 1998 because of asbestos.

== Famous trials ==
The notorious serial killer Ted Bundy was tried for the murder of Kimberly Leach at the Orange County Courthouse beginning on January 7, 1980. Defense attorneys Julius Africano and Lynn Thompson attempted a plea of not guilty by reason of insanity, but on February 7 the verdict of "Guilty" was issued.

The name "Ted Bundy" is carved into one of the tables in the historic courtroom. This was definitely not done by Ted Bundy himself. Bundy never set foot in that section of the building (his trial took place in the attached annex which has now been demolished), and many eyewitness accounts of the bailiffs whose care he was under confirm this.
