= Centro Ybor station =

TECO line station in Tampa

Centro Ybor
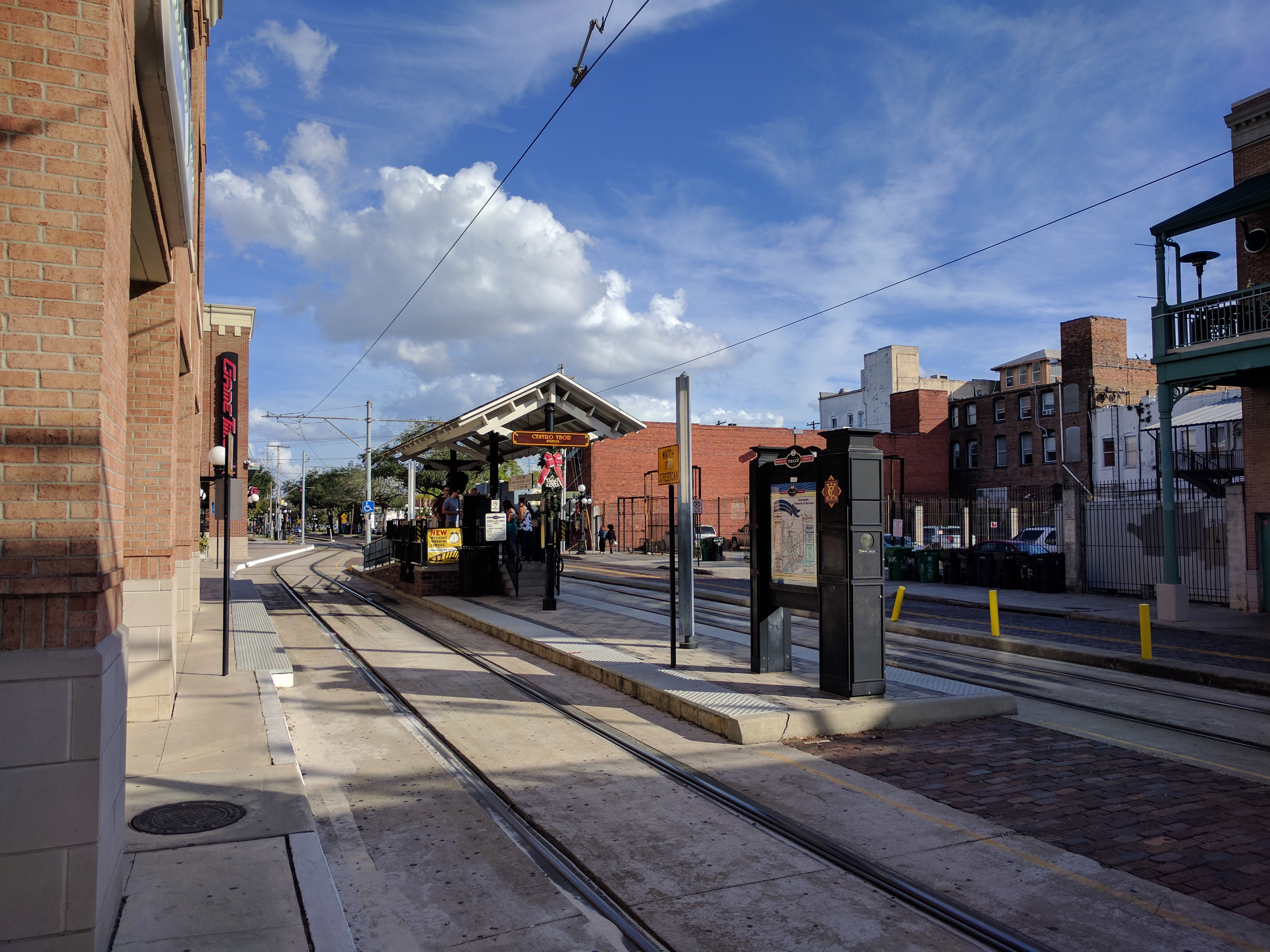
- The platform at Centro Ybor station

General information
- Location: 16th Street and 8th Avenue; Centro Ybor City, FL
- Coordinates: 27°57′39.8″N 82°26′28.4″W
- Owner: HARTline
- Platforms: 1 island platform
- Tracks: 2

Construction
- Structure type: at-grade
- Accessible: yes

History
- Opened: October 20, 2002
- Former names: Tampa Bay Federal Credit Union

Services
Preceding station	HART	Following station
Streetcar Society toward Whiting	TECO Line	Centennial Park Terminus
Location

Centro Ybor (formerly known as Tampa Bay Federal Credit Union) is a TECO Line streetcar station in historic Ybor City. The station has one island platform, located on a passing siding, that allows for trams to pass by each other on the single track line. Just west of the stations, there are two pedestrian overpasses over 8th Avenue that are part of the Centro Ybor complex.

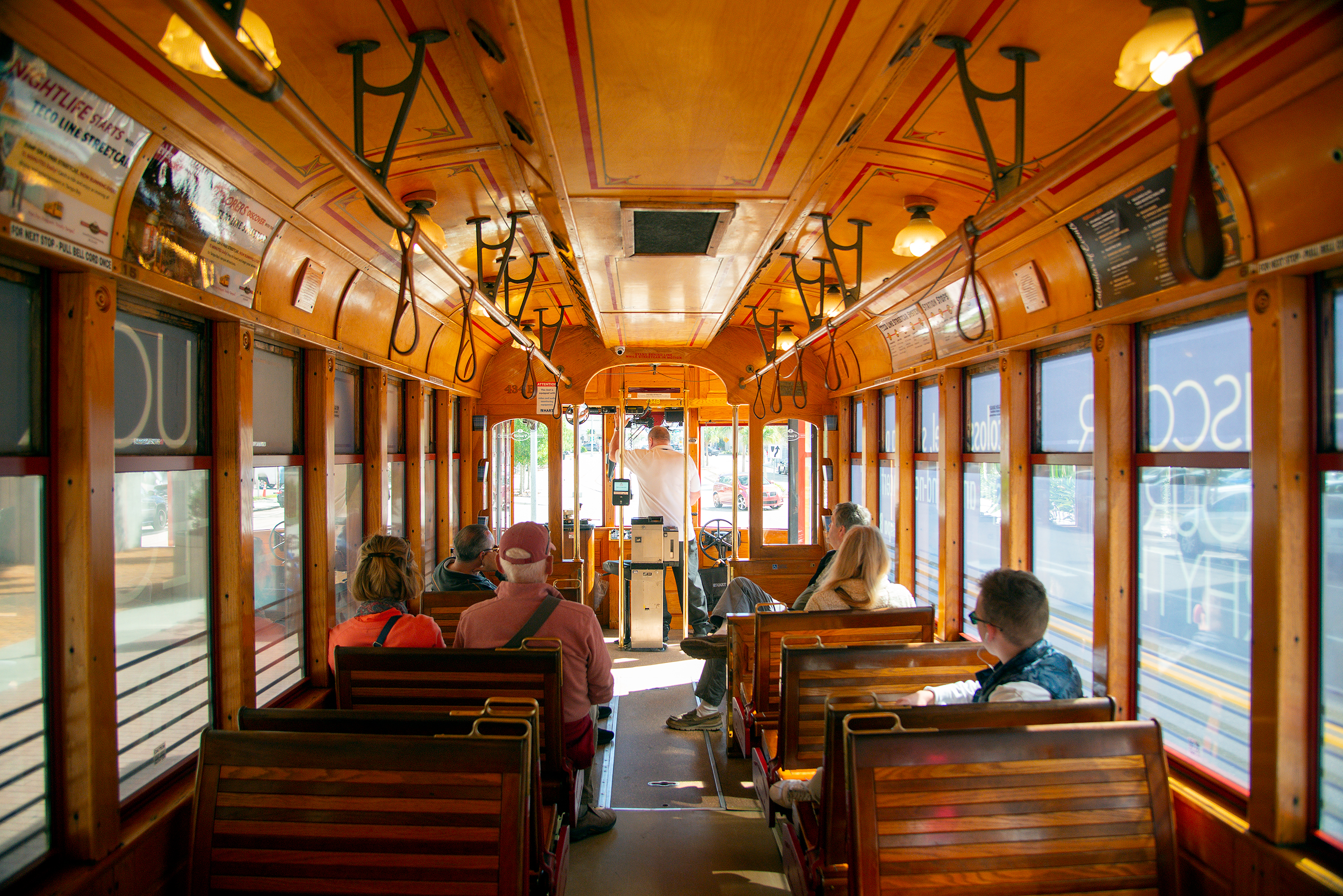
Interior of a TECO car

== Within walking distance ==
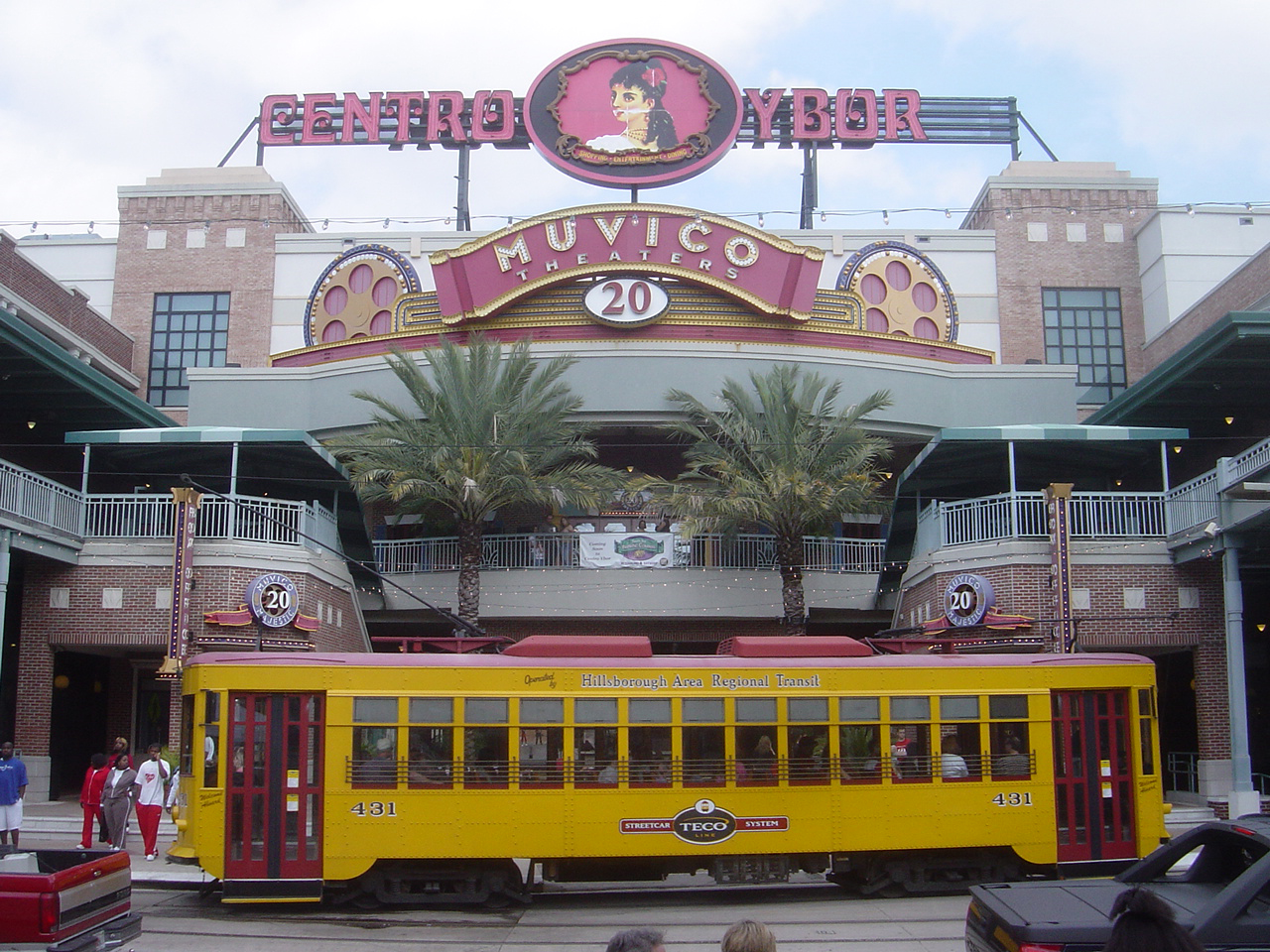
Looking at the Centro Ybor complex just west of the station

- Centro Ybor
- Ybor City Historic District
- Centro Ybor Museum

== See also ==
- Light rail in the United States
- List of streetcar systems in the United States
- Streetcars in North America
- Transportation in Florida
