= Abraham Munn =

Founder of Lakeland, Florida

Abraham Godwin Munn
- Born: c. 1818; New Jersey
- Died: 1910
- Occupations: Founder, Lakeland, Florida
- Spouses: Rebecca Morton Munn Ariana Godwin Munn
- Children: Morris G. Munn; Samuel Morton Munn

Abraham Munn (c. 1818 – 1910) was the founder of the city of Lakeland, Florida. Hailing originally from New Jersey, Munn gained notoriety as a producer of agricultural implements, through Munn & Company, in Louisville, Kentucky. This company was incorporated into Brennan & Co. Southwestern Agricultural Works when Thomas Brennan became a partner in 1882. In 1884, at the Munn property that is now part of Lakeland, the South Florida Railroad passed through, connecting Kissimmee to Tampa. Munn provided local amenities and a railroad station to supplement the line, as well as plots of land adjacent to the line. In 1885, the area was incorporated as Lakeland, Florida. The central park of Lakeland is named Munn Park in honor of the city's founder.
