= Munn Park Historic District =

Historic district in Florida, United States

- U.S. National Register of Historic Places
- U.S. Historic district
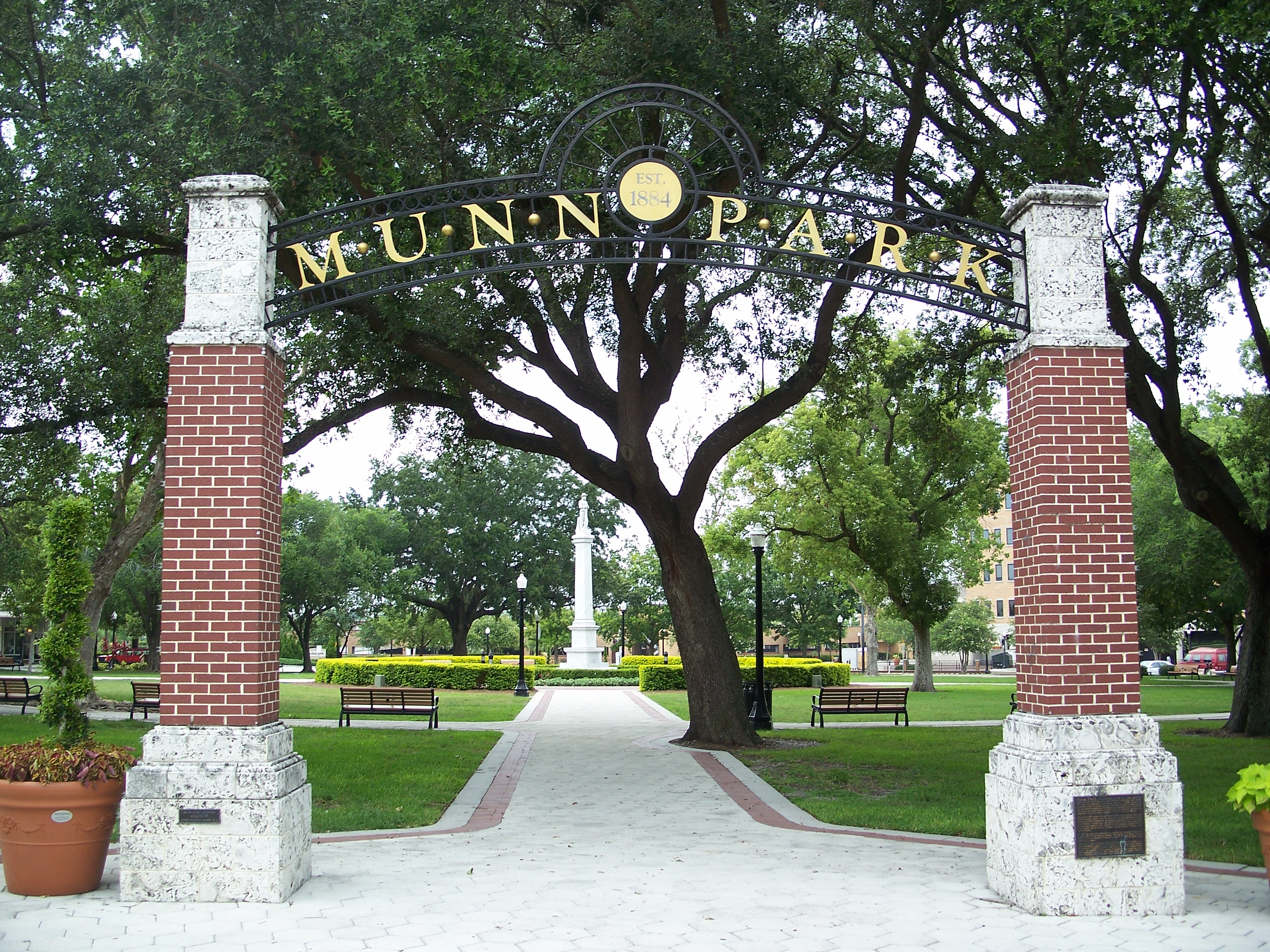
- One of the entrances to the park

- Location within Florida Location within the United States
- Location: Lakeland, Florida
- Coordinates: 28°2′37″N 81°57′17″W
- Area: 650 acres (2.6 km^{2})
- NRHP reference No.: 97001228
- Added to NRHP: November 3, 1997

The Munn Park Historic District is a U.S. historic district (designated as such on November 3, 1997) located in Lakeland, Florida. It is named in honor of the city's founder, Abraham Munn. The district is bounded by East Bay Street, North Florida Avenue, East Orange Street, and East Main Street. It contains 48 historic buildings and 1 object.

The central feature of the district is Munn Park. On June 3, 1910, the Daughters of the Confederacy erected a Confederate monument in the center of the park. It was removed March 22, 2019.

== Gallery ==
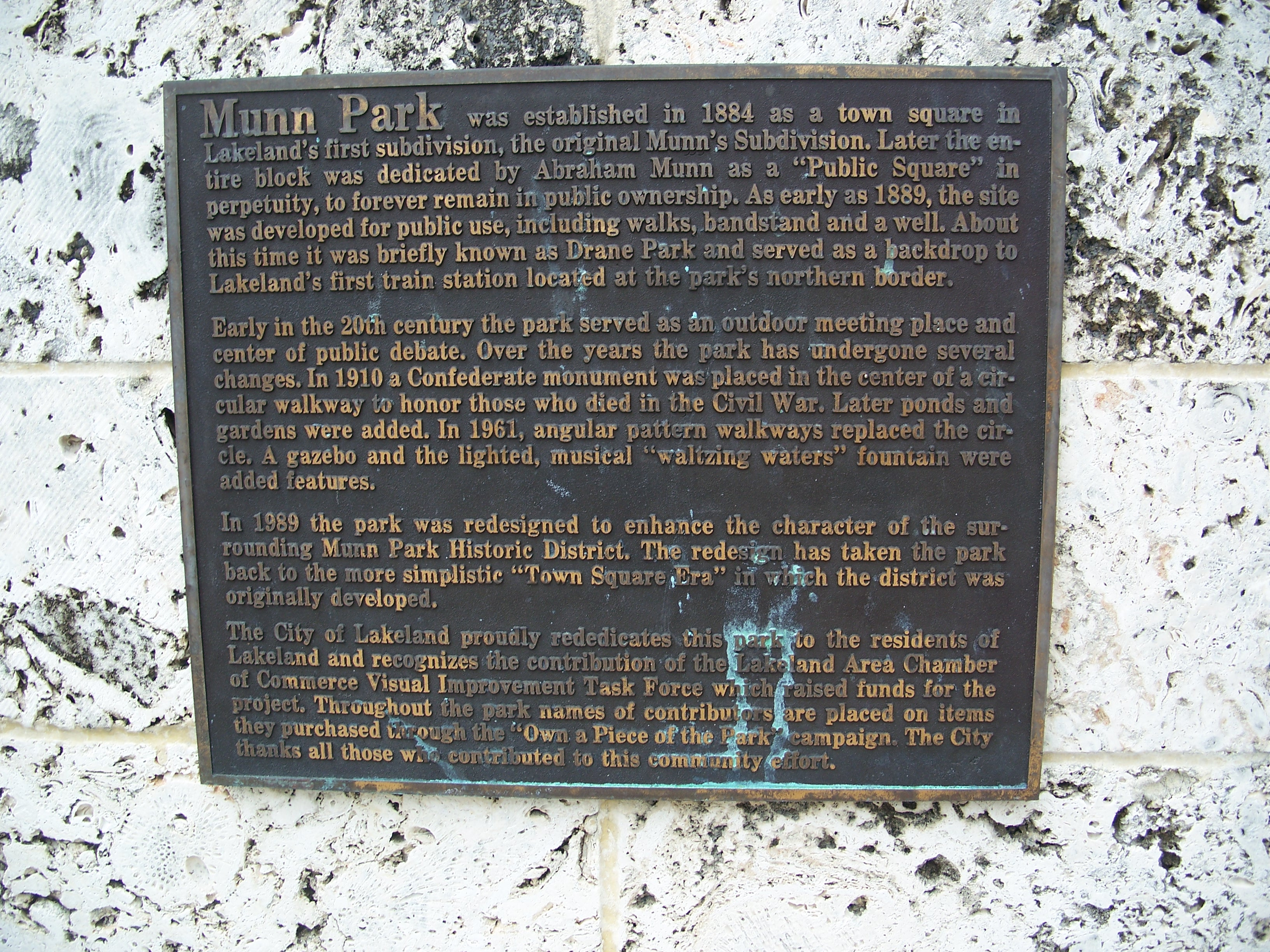
Informational plaque

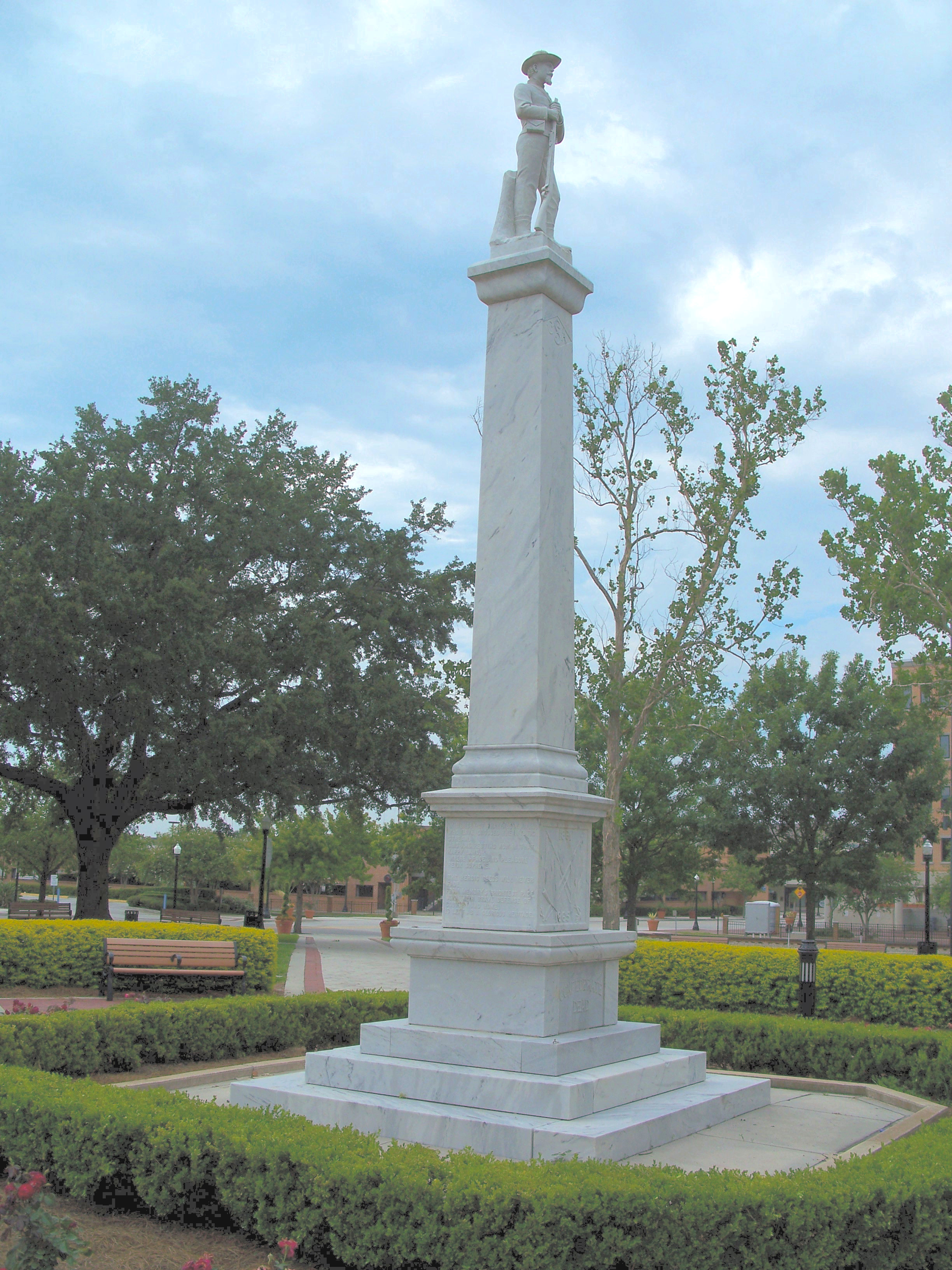
Confederate statue

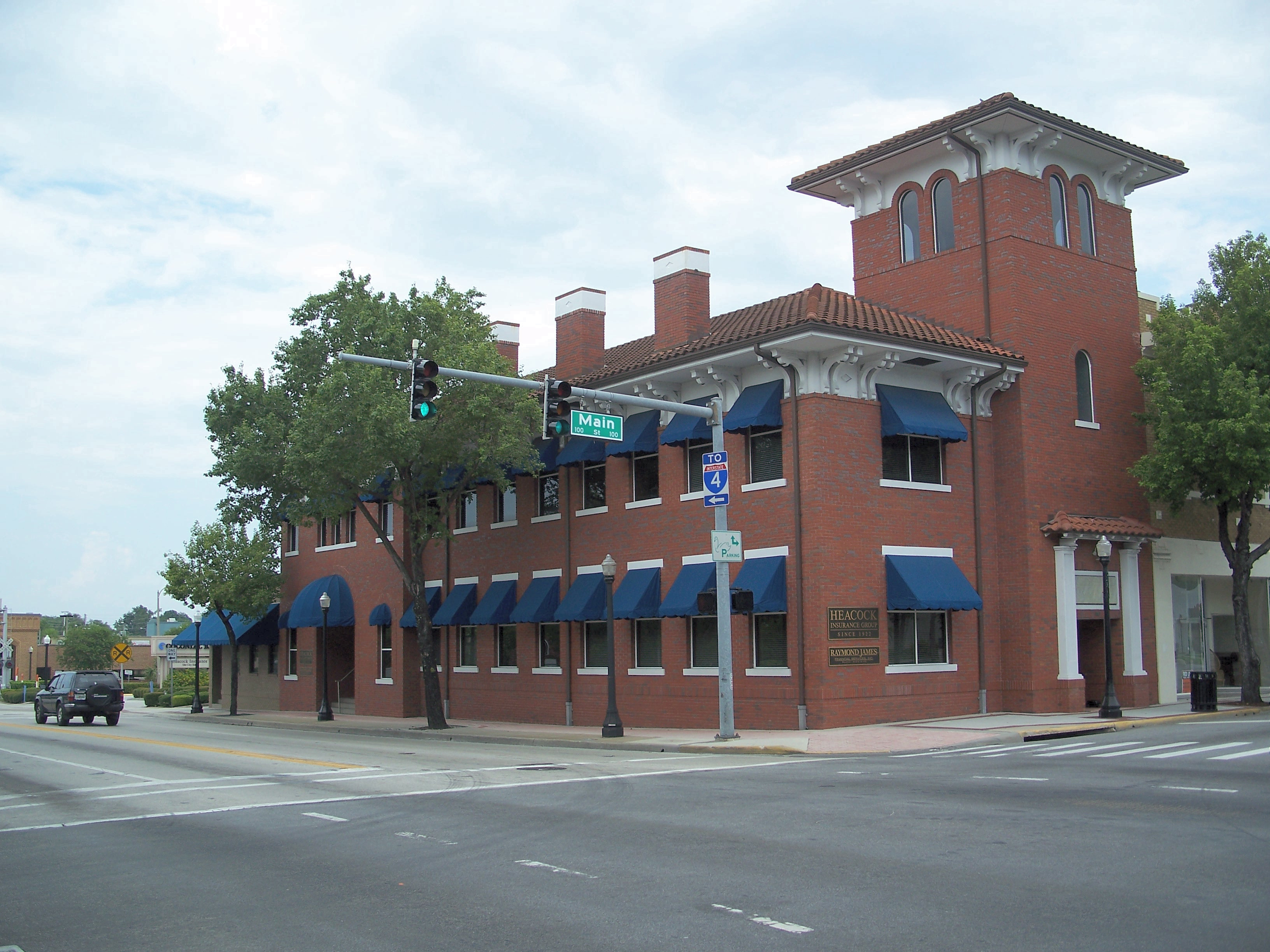
Old city hall

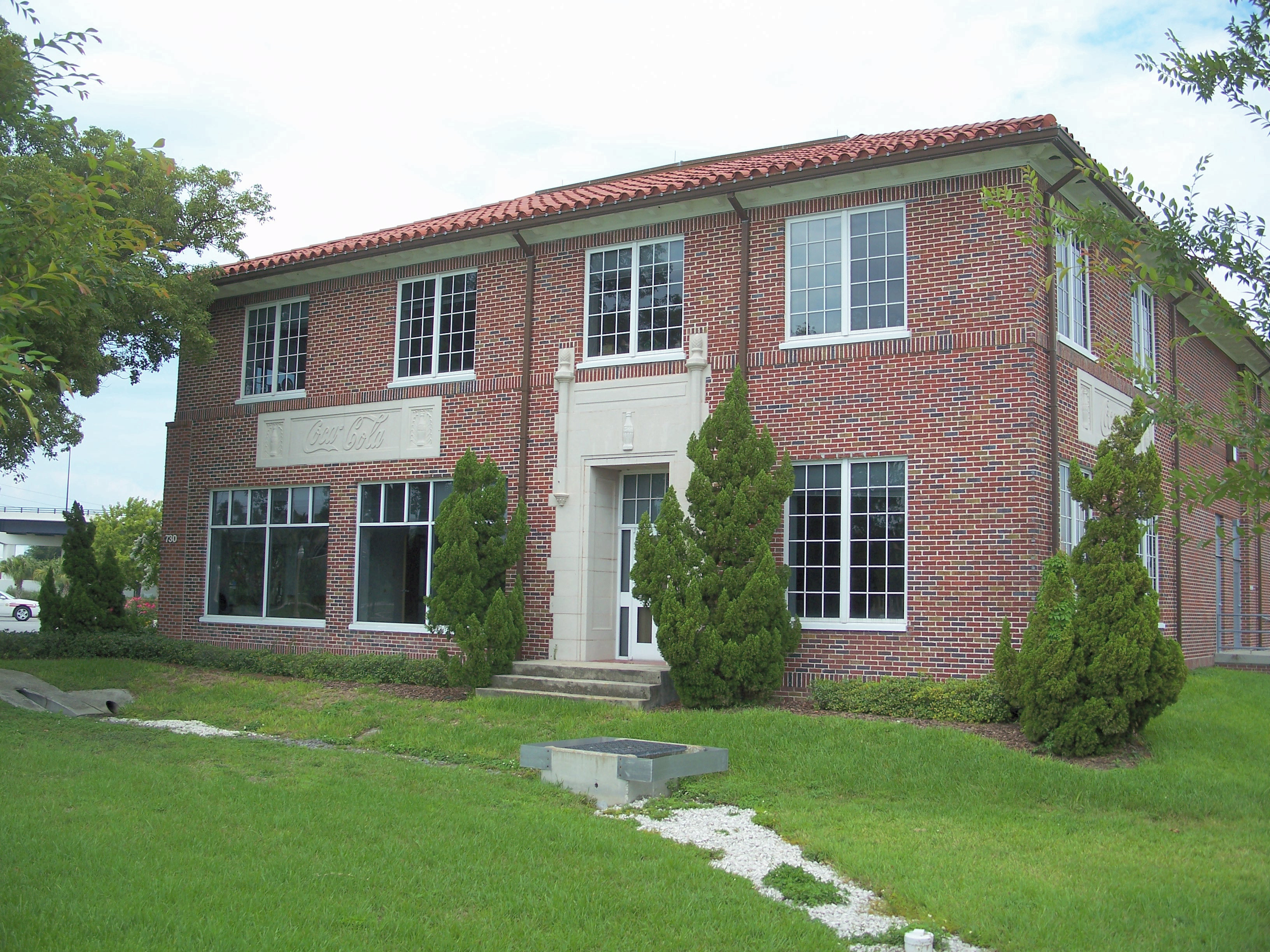
Old Coca-Cola building, now home to the fire department
