= Historical Society of Central Florida =

The Historical Society of Central Florida
- Formation: 1942; 84 years ago
- Type: Historical Society
- Headquarters: Orange County Regional; History Center
- Location(s): 65 East Central Boulevard; Orlando, Florida
- Website: www.thehistorycenter.org

The Historical Society of Central Florida, formerly the Orange County Historical Society, is a historical society located in Orlando, Florida, United States. Located at the Orange County Regional History Center in the old Orange County Courthouse, the Historical Society collects and preserves the regional history of Central Florida.

== See also ==
- List of historical societies in Florida
