= St. Petersburg–Tampa Airboat Line =

Early airline which operated in Florida, United States (Jan-May 1914)

SPT Airboat Line
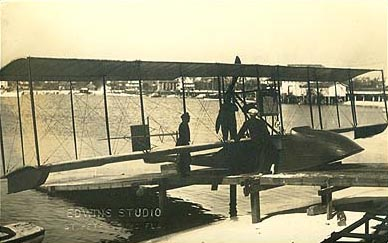
IATA	ICAO	Call sign
-	-	-
- Founded: 1913; 113 years ago
- Commenced operations: January 1, 1914; 112 years ago
- Ceased operations: May 5, 1914; 112 years ago
- Fleet size: 2
- Destinations: St. Petersburg, Tampa
- Headquarters: Tampa, Florida, U.S.
- Key people: Thomas W. Benoist

The St. Petersburg–Tampa Airboat Line (SPT Airboat Line) was the first scheduled airline in the United States using a fixed wing aircraft. The airline provided service between St. Petersburg, Florida and neighboring Tampa across Tampa Bay, a distance of about 23 miles (37 km). It was in service from January to May 1914.

== History ==
P. E. Fansler brought in Thomas W. Benoist to start a service using his new airboats to create a service to connect the two cities that were as much as a day's travel apart in 1913 depending on means of travel: 2 hours by boat, 20 hours by car, 4 to 12 hours by train. By plane, the travel time was about 23 minutes. A 3-month contract was signed with the St. Petersburg board of trade on the 10th anniversary of the Kitty Hawk flight on December 17, 1913, according to which the Board of Trade agreed to guarantee meeting the expenses of the airline should it not break even. The hangars promised for the airline were not completed, and the company's green-hulled airboat Number 44 went missing for several days leading up to the launch date as the freight train carrying it could not be located. (Refer to Benoist Type XIV for further information on the airboats used on the St. Petersburg-Tampa Airboat Line, including clarification on the wide-spread The Lark of Duluth and Benoist Number 44 conflation confusion, which was straightened out via the reliance on primary sources, in this case, numerous 1913-1914 newspaper articles and Aero and Hydro publications.)

On January 1, 1914, the SPT Airboat Line became the first scheduled winged airline service in the United States. (Note: On March 22, 1913, Compagnie générale transaérienne started the world's first scheduled passenger-carrying fixed-wing flights within France and before that was operating a seaplane service in Switzerland on lakes Lucerne and Geneva.) That same day, Antony H. Jannus piloted the airline's Benoist Type XIV on its maiden flight between St. Petersburg and Tampa. Due to widespread media coverage by the St. Petersburg Times, there were reportedly over 3,000 spectators at a parade accompanied by an Italian band at the departure point. An auction was then conducted for the first round-trip ticket. It was won with a final bid of $400 by the former mayor of St. Petersburg, Abram C. Pheil. Pheil then boarded the wooden, open-air craft for the 23-minute flight that rarely exceeded an altitude of 5 feet (1.5 m) above the water of Tampa Bay. Two additional Benoist air boats were added to the fleet soon after. One was used to ferry passengers; it was a 3-person-capacity Benoist Number 45 equipped with a 75hp Roberts motor. And the second one was a one-person capacity airboat used to train pilots. Ticket prices were $5 per one-way flight (equivalent to $161 in 2025). The first air-cargo was a bundle of St. Petersburg Times newspapers. Freight rates were $5 per 100 pounds.

The airline continued to make flights until May 5, 1914, five weeks after contract termination. From start to finish, the airline covered over 7,000 miles (11,000 km), 172 flights, and 1,205 passengers.

Commenting on the significance of the St. Petersburg–Tampa Airboat line, Thomas Benoist, the builder of the Benoist airboats, said, "Some day people will be crossing oceans on airliners like they do on steamships today." The airline served as a prototype for today's global airline industry.

== Aircraft ==
A Benoist XIV was used for flights.

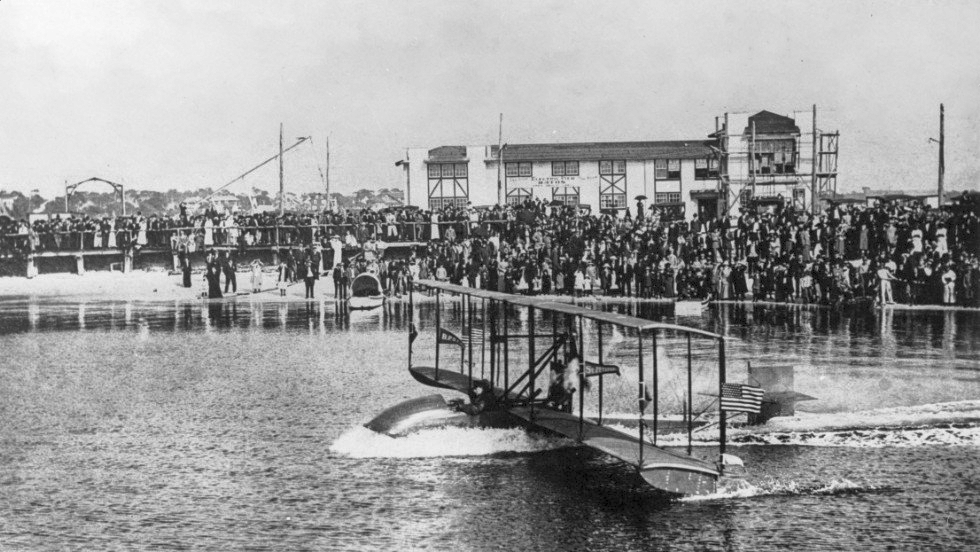
First takeoff run, January 1, 1914.

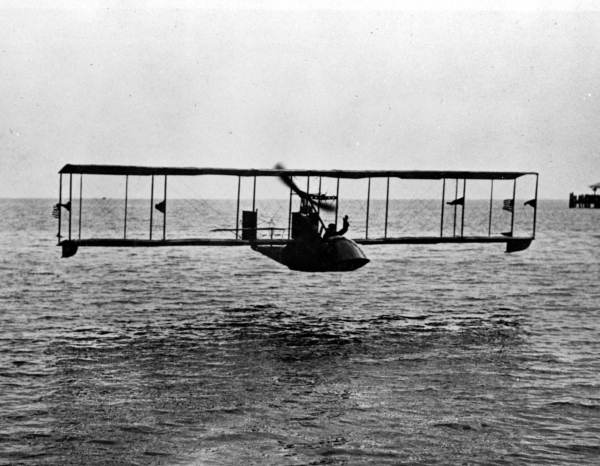
Airplane over Tampa Bay in 1914

== See also ==
- List of airlines by foundation date
- List of defunct airlines of the United States
