= Parkshore Plaza =

29-story skyscraper located in downtown St. Petersburg, Florida

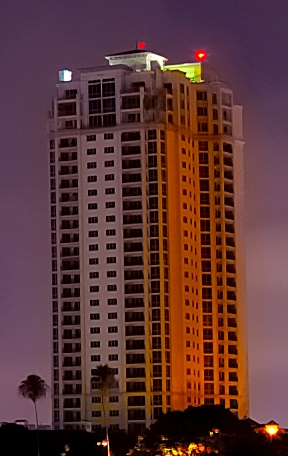
- Parkshore Plaza at night

- Location within Florida
- Alternative names: (North) Opus Tower

General information
- Status: Completed
- Type: Residential Condominium
- Architectural style: Post Modernism
- Location: North Downtown, 300 Beach Drive Northeast, St. Petersburg, Florida, United States
- Coordinates: 27.7753°N 82.6347°W
- Construction started: 2004
- Completed: 2006
- Cost: US$85 million – 100 million

Height
- Height: 108.2 m (355 ft)

Technical details
- Floor count: 29
- Floor area: 379,988 sq ft (35,302.0 m^{2})
- Lifts/elevators: 4

Design and construction
- Architecture firm: SB Architects
- Developer: Opus South Corporation
- Structural engineer: DeSimone Consulting Engineers
- Services engineer: Hufsey Nicolaides Garcia Suarez Associates Inc.

Other information
- Number of rooms: 117

Parkshore Plaza is a 29-story skyscraper located in downtown St. Petersburg, Florida. Before the Parkshore Plaza announcement, another tower called The Villas One was going to be constructed in the same lot. Original construction of the Villas was going to begin in 2002, however was cancelled in late 2002. After the cancellation of the first tower, the Parkshore Plaza was announced in early 2003. Construction of the tower began in 2004, and was completed by the summer of 2006. At 108.2 m (355 ft), it was the tallest condominium tower in St. Petersburg until 2009, following the constriction of two new condominium towers Ovation and Signature Place. The Parkshore Plaza contains 117 total units, 96 of which are located in the tower itself and 21 are city-homes.

== See also ==
- List of tallest buildings in St. Petersburg, Florida
