= One St. Petersburg =

American high rise condominium located in the city of St. Petersburg, Florida

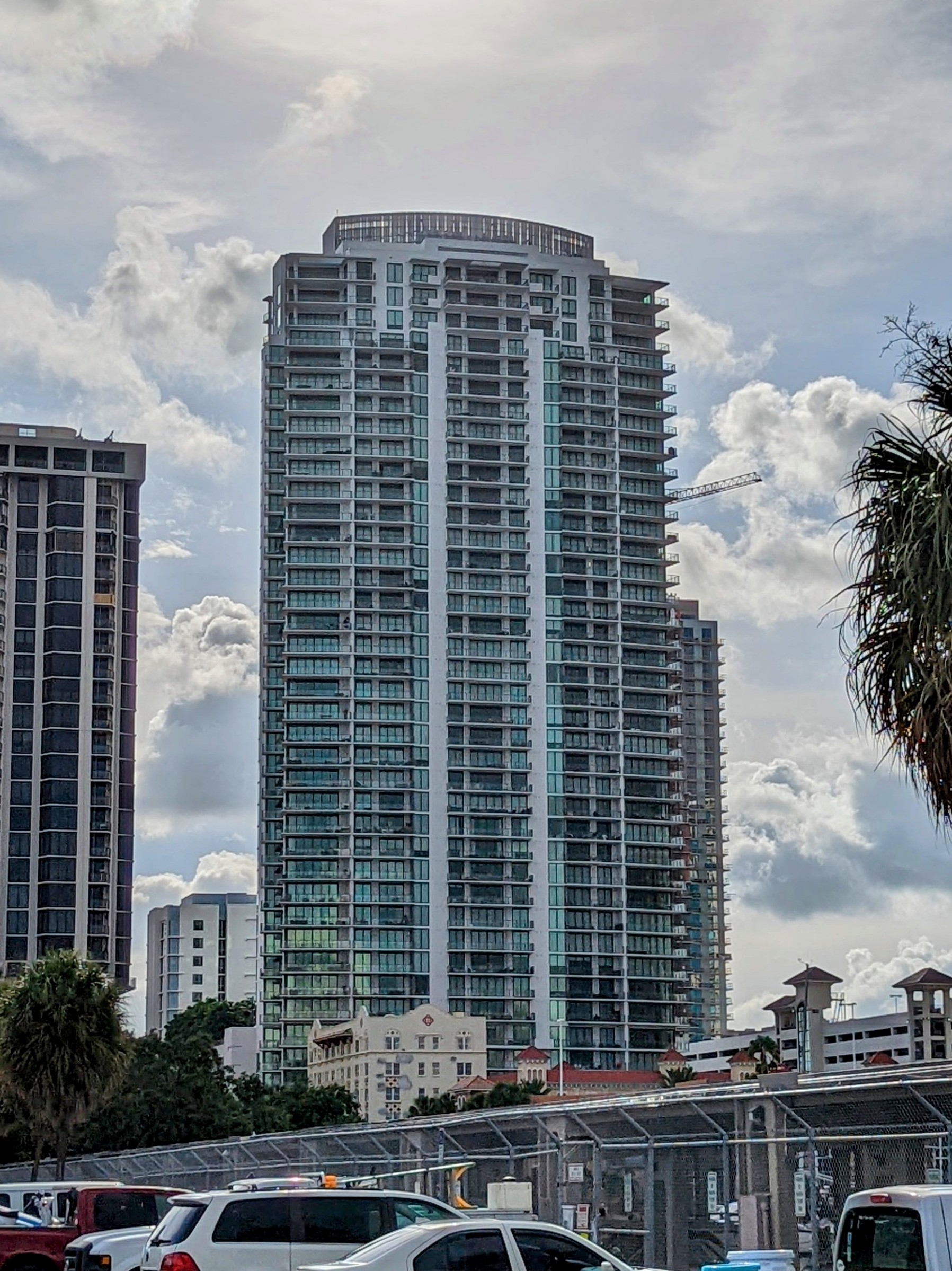
- Alternative names: One

General information
- Status: Completed
- Type: Condominium; Hotel
- Architectural style: Modern
- Location: Downtown, 100 1st Avenue North, St. Petersburg, Florida, United States
- Coordinates: 27°46′16″N 82°38′03″W
- Groundbreaking: November 11, 2015
- Construction started: November 17, 2015
- Estimated completion: 2019
- Inaugurated: 2019
- Cost: US$120 million

Height
- Roof: 450 ft (140 m); N/A

Technical details
- Floor count: 41; 13
- Floor area: 800,000 sq ft (74,000 m^{2}); 152,000 sq ft (14,100 m^{2})
- Grounds: 2.2 acres

Design and construction
- Developer: Kolter Group
- Known for: Tallest Building in Saint Petersburg, Florida and Tallest Building in Pinellas County, Florida

Other information
- Number of rooms: 253; 174

Website
- One St. Petersburg

One St. Petersburg is a 41-story high rise condominium located in the city of St. Petersburg, Florida, United States. Standing 450 feet (140 m) tall, it is the tallest building in St. Petersburg and Pinellas County. The high rise contains 253 condominium rooms that range from 1,400 to 2,500 square feet. The building's second high rise includes a hotel across the lot with 174 rooms, 13 stories high. The ground level of the building contains retail space. Construction began on November 16, 2015, and was completed in 2019, after a delay from the original planned date of 2018.

== Gallery ==
Hotel of the high-rise under construction in November 2016

== See also ==
- List of tallest buildings in St. Petersburg
