= 400 Central =

Residential building in Florida, United States

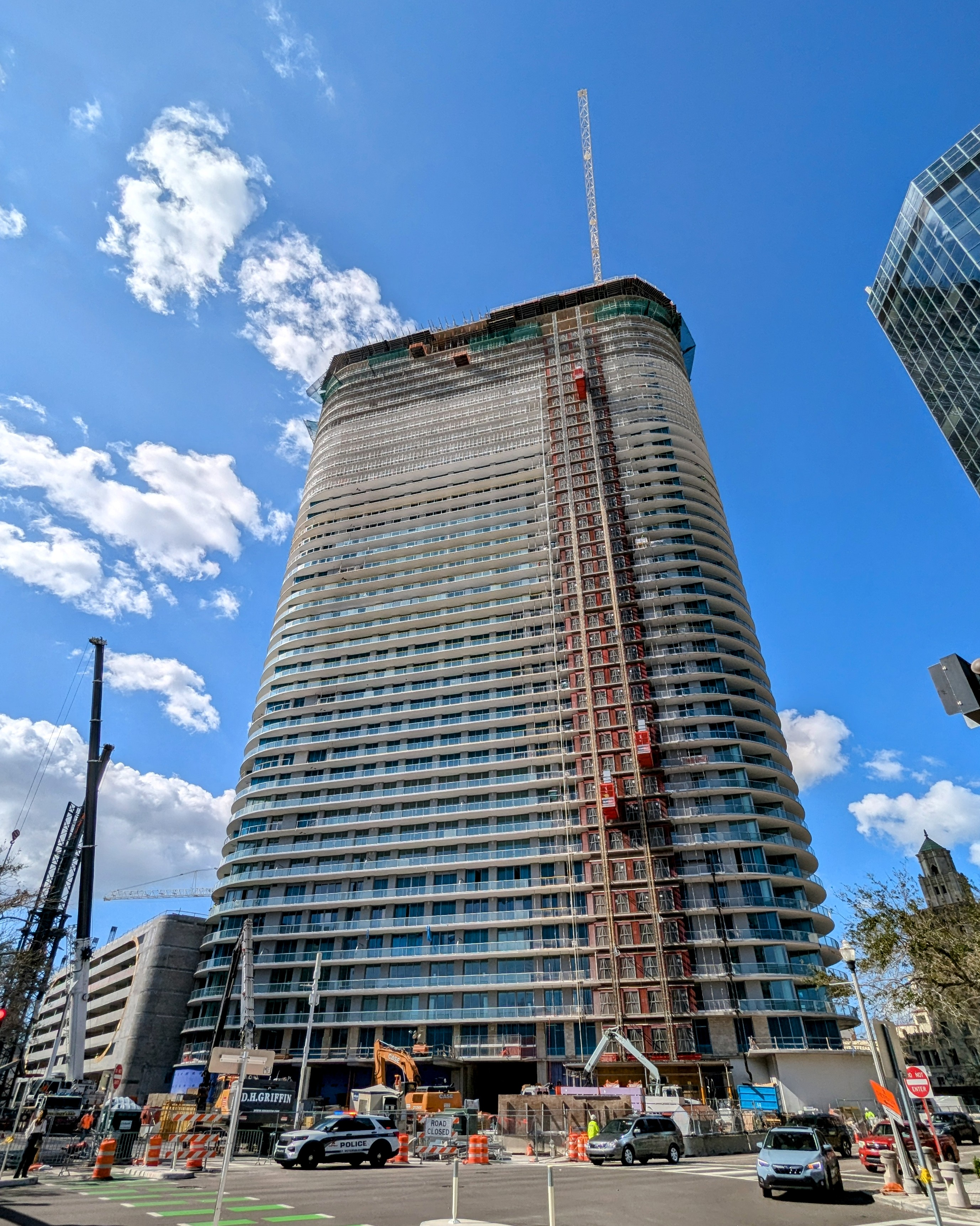
- Under construction, October 2024
- Interactive map of the 400 Central area

General information
- Status: Topped-out
- Type: Residential
- Location: 400 Central Ave, St. Petersburg, Florida
- Coordinates: 27°46′15″N 82°38′20″W

Height
- Roof: 515 ft (157 m)

Technical details
- Floor count: 46

Design and construction
- Architect: Arquitectonica
- Developer: Red Apple Group
- Main contractor: Suffolk Construction Company, Inc.

400 Central, also known as Residence 400 Central or Residences at 400 Central, is a 515 feet (157 m) tall residential building in St. Petersburg, Florida. Located at the intersection of Central Avenue and 4th Street, it is the tallest building currently topped-out in St. Petersburg and is the tallest residential building in the Tampa Bay area.

Developed by the Red Apple Group, the design features a stadium shaped residential condominium, aligned diagonally to the street grid, towering over a mixed-use office and retail base structure. A previous plan to develop a hotel within the complex was scrapped in 2021. Construction on 400 Central began in October 2022.

== Incidents ==
=== Crane collapse during Hurricane Milton ===
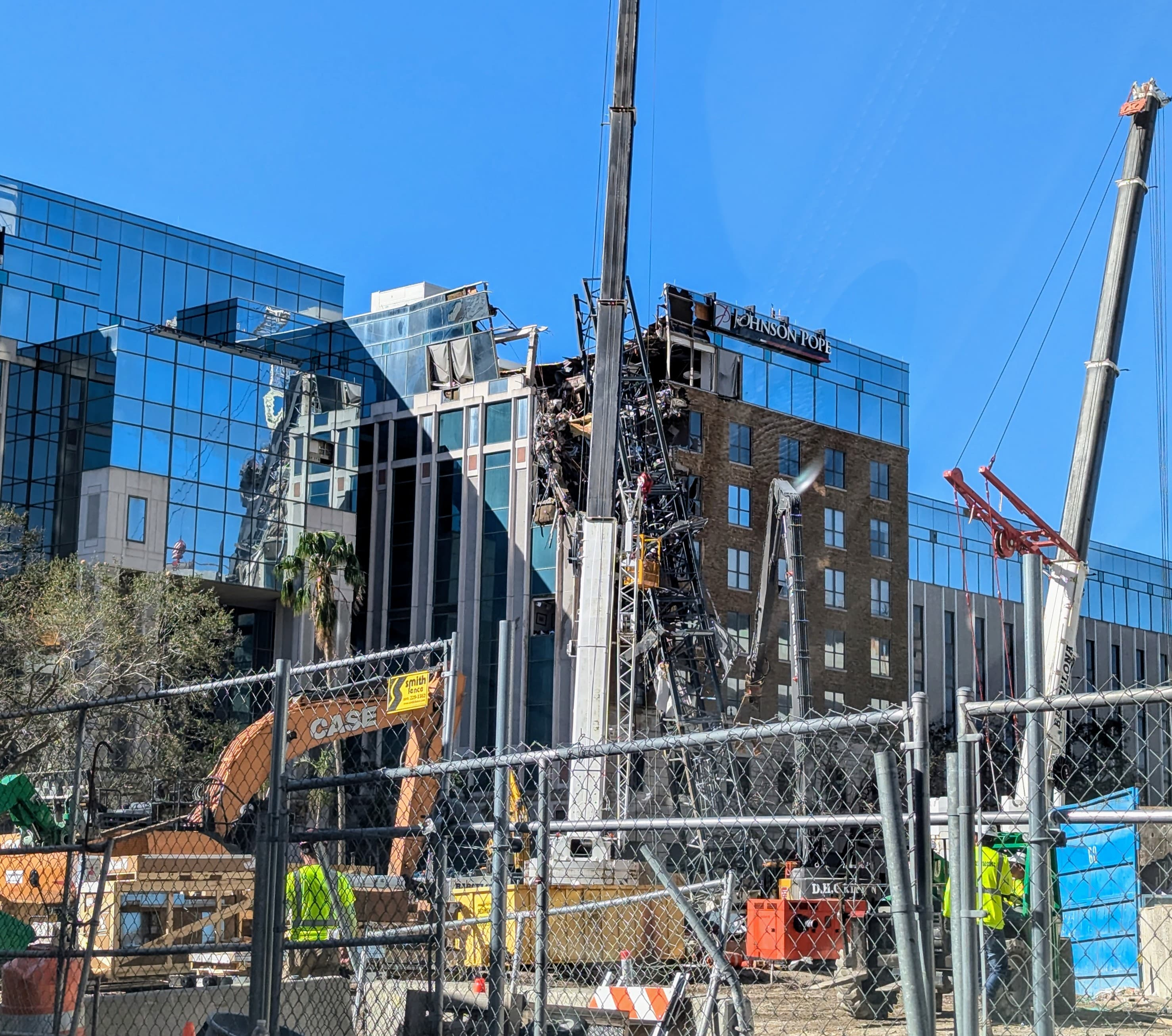
The collapsed construction crane lying on the Tampa Bay Times building.

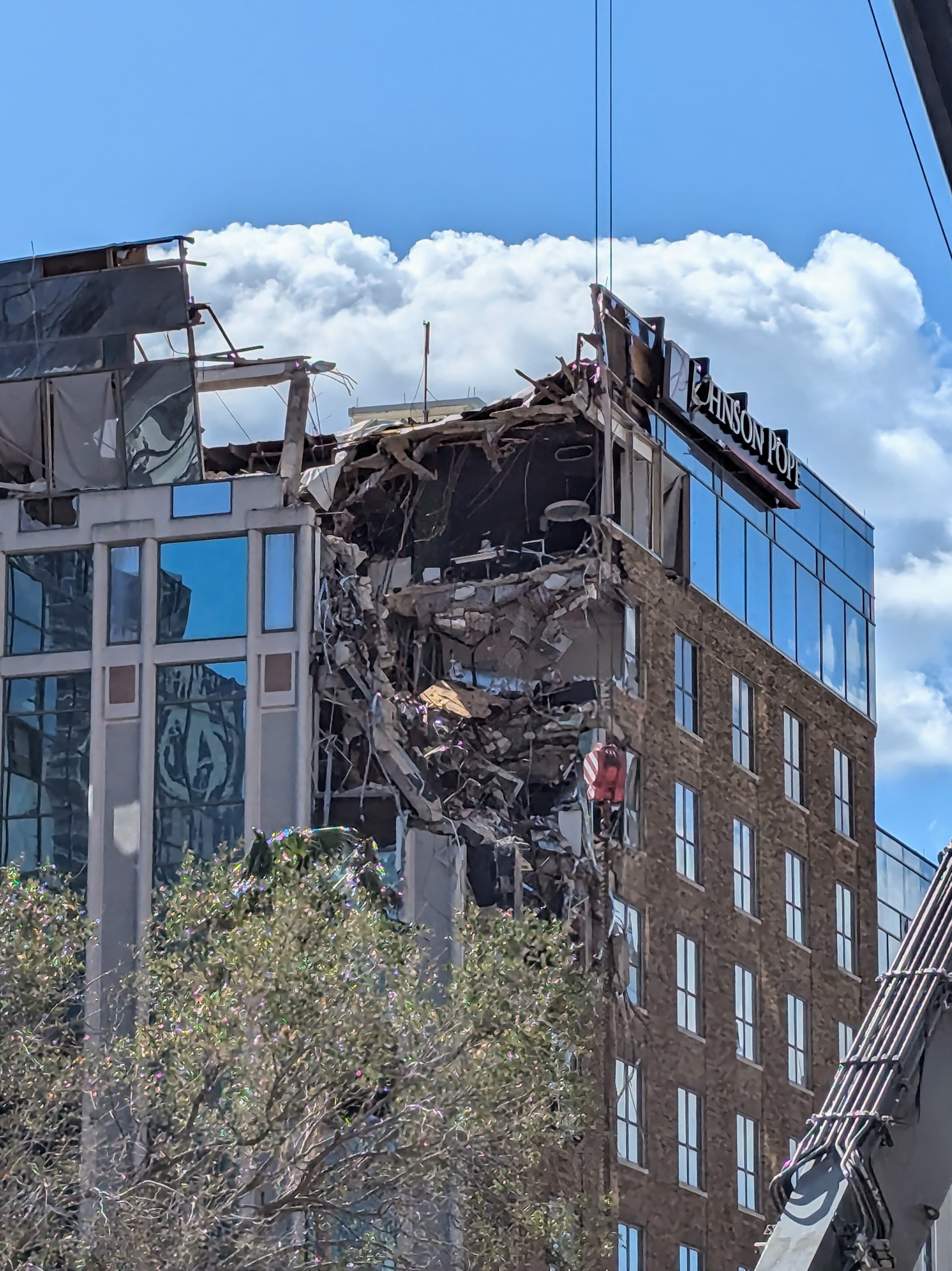
Damage to the northeastern corner of 490 First Ave S.

On October 9, 2024, a construction crane of 400 Central collapsed during Hurricane Milton, causing extensive structural damage to several floors of the adjacent 490 First Ave S, more commonly known as the Tampa Bay Times building. No injuries were reported as the area had already been evacuated prior to the storm. The crane collapse also obstructed First Avenue South, a major road leading to downtown St. Petersburg, blocking eastbound traffic for several blocks.

City officials said the cranes were rated to be safe for winds up to 120 mph (190 km/h). The highest wind gust reported in the city during Hurricane Milton was 101 mph (163 km/h) at the Albert Whitted Airport.

== See also ==
List of tallest buildings in St. Petersburg, Florida
