= 200 Central Avenue =

Skyscraper in St. Petersburg, Florida

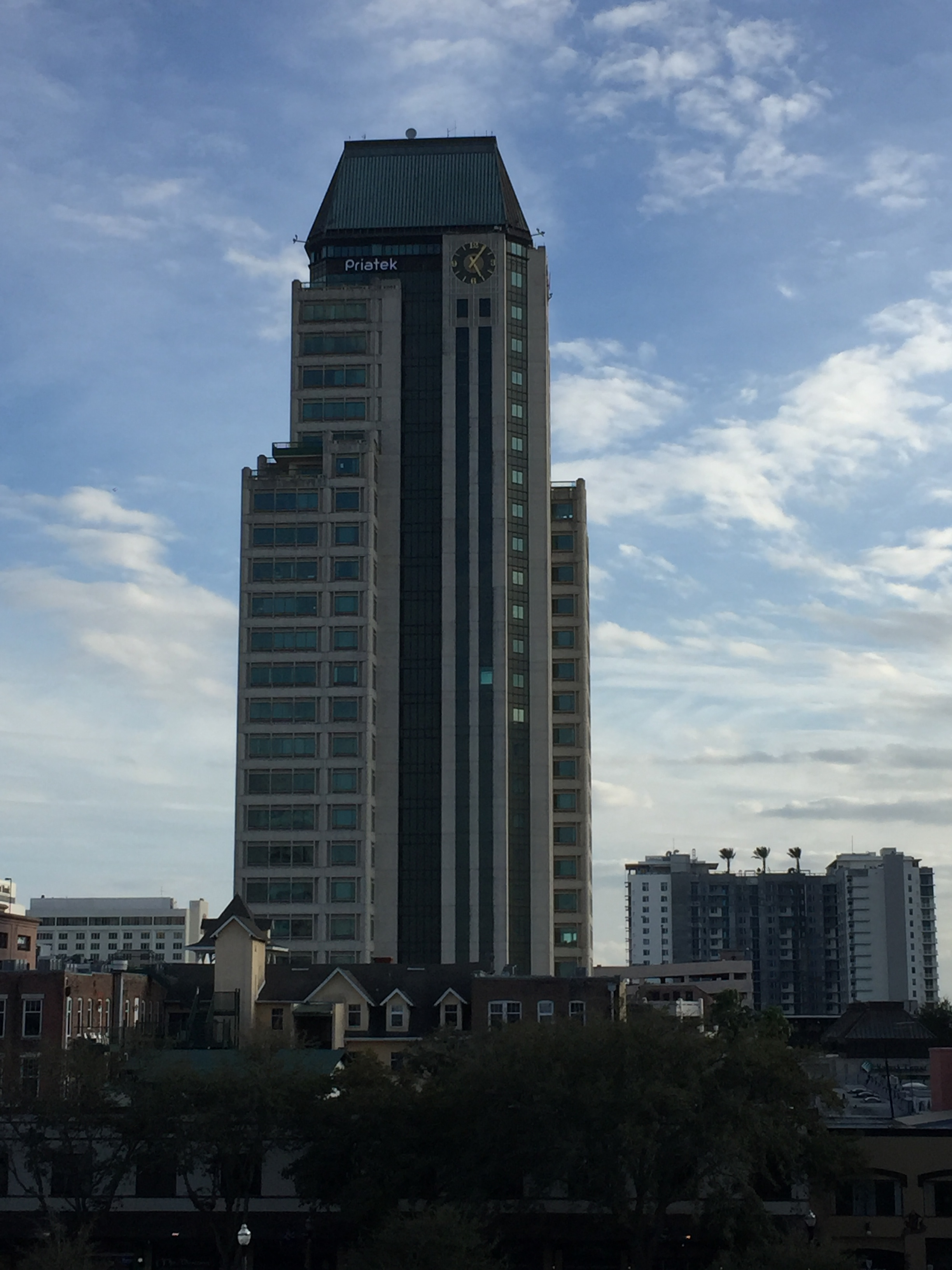
- View of the tower occupied under the name Priatek
- Former names: Priatek Plaza; Bank of America Tower; NationsBank Tower; Barnett Bank Tower
- Alternative names: One Progress Plaza

General information
- Status: Completed
- Type: Commercial offices
- Location: 200 Central Avenue, St. Petersburg, Florida
- Coordinates: 27.77054°N 82.63591°W
- Completed: 1990
- Owner: Feldman Equities
- Operator: Kucera Properties

Height
- Roof: 117.65 m (386.0 ft)

Technical details
- Floor count: 28
- Floor area: 295,200 sq ft (27,420 m^{2})
- Lifts/elevators: 8

Design and construction
- Architect: Jung Brannen Associates

200 Central Avenue, or 200 Central, is a 28-story skyscraper designed by Jung Brannen Associates located at the corner of Central Avenue and 2nd Street South in downtown St. Petersburg, Florida. The skyscraper is formerly known as One Progress Plaza, Bank of America Tower, and Priatek Plaza. It was completed in 1990, and at 117.65 m (386.0 ft), it is one of the tallest buildings in the city, and has the largest tenant occupancy in a commercial office building on the entire South West coast of Florida.

On September 18, 2015, Kucera Properties announced that the tower would be renamed Priatek Plaza after the company Priatek. Priatek, which occupies about 8,000 square feet (740 m^{2}) on the 23rd floor of the tower, had moved its headquarters into the tower after Kucera Properties had offered them an undisclosed amount. The official dedication ceremony for the new plaza's name was held on September 17, 2015.

200 Central Avenue changed ownership on May 28, 2026, with the acquisition by Feldman Equities.

Other major tenants located in 200 Central Avenue include, Merrill Lynch, Raymond James, and ARK Invest.
