= List of tallest buildings in St. Petersburg, Florida =

Skyline of St. Petersburg
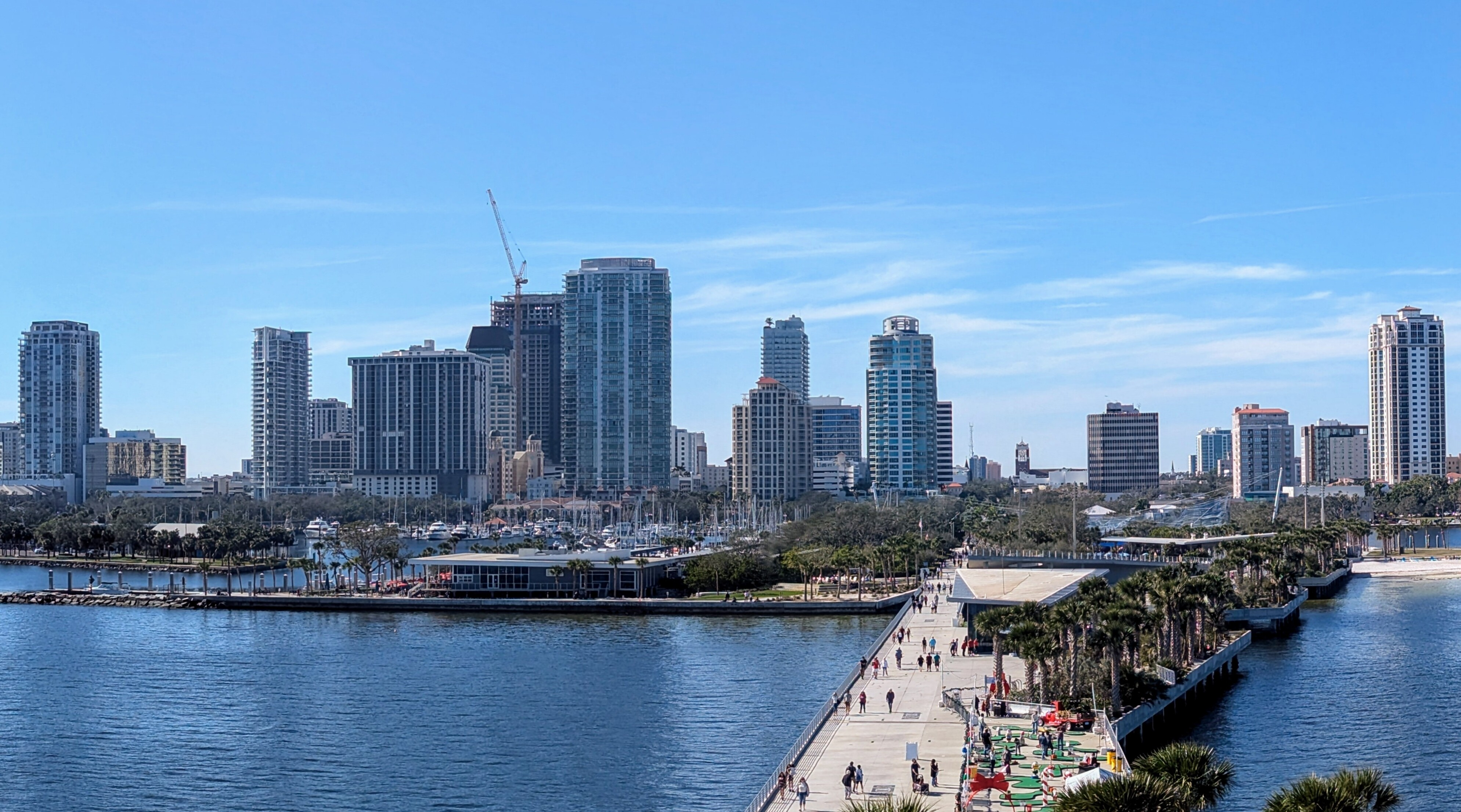
- Downtown St. Petersburg in 2024
- Tallest building: 400 Central (2025)
- Tallest building height: 515 ft (157 m)
- First 150 m+ building: 400 Central

Number of tall buildings (2026)
- Taller than 100 m (328 ft): 10 + 1 T/O
- Taller than 150 m (492 ft): 1

Number of tall buildings — feet
- Taller than 200 ft (61.0 m): 22 + 1 T/O
- Taller than 300 ft (91.4 m): 12 + 1 T/O

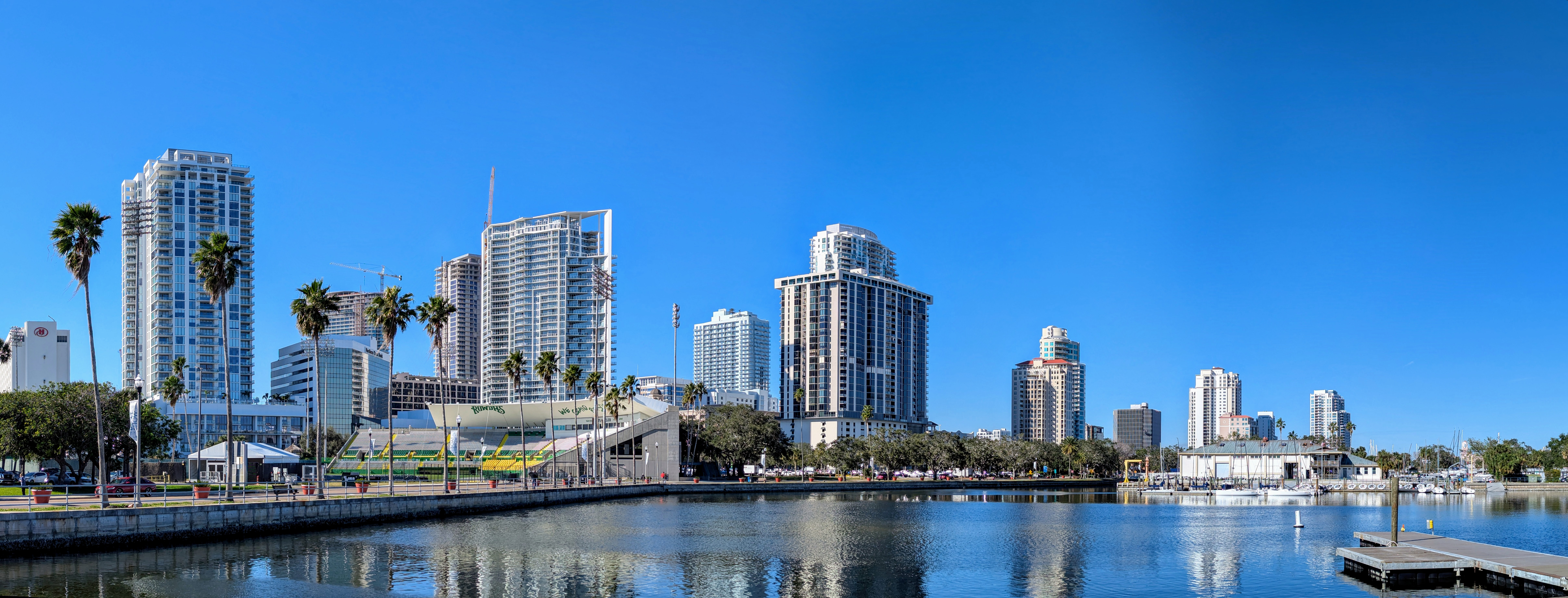
St. Petersburg skyline from Bayshore Drive South

St. Petersburg is the fifth largest city in Florida and the second largest city in the Tampa Bay Area, with a population of 258,308 as of 2020. The city is home to over 55 high-rises, out of which 22 are over 200 feet (61 m) tall as of 2026. Twelve buildings stand taller than 300 ft (61 m). The tallest building in St. Petersburg is 400 Central, a 515 ft (157 m), 46-story residential tower completed in 2025. 400 Central is the first and only building to surpass the 492 ft (150 m) mark. Previously, the title of the city's tallest was held by the 456 ft (139 m), 41-story One St. Petersburg, another residential building. St. Petersburg's tallest buildings are concentrated in Downtown St. Petersburg. Together with Tampa, the Tampa Bay Area has a total of 28 buildings taller than 300 feet (91 m).

The first high-rises in St. Petersburg appeared in the 1960s. Bayfront Tower, built in 1975 near the city's coast on Tampa Bay, was the first to surpass 300 ft (91 m) in height. Several office buildings were constructed in the late 20th century, including Plaza Tower in 1978, First Central Tower in 1984, and 200 Central Avenue in 1990. 200 Central Avenue, at a height of 386 ft (118 m), held the record for the tallest building in the city for nearly 30 years.

From the 1990s to the late 2000s, an economic boom in luxury condos took place in St. Petersburg, encouraged by a combination of tourism and wealthy residents. This led to the completion of residential towers such as Signature Place and Ovation, then the city's second and third tallest buildings. Signature Place in particular has been credited for representing a major transition in St. Petersburg's modern architecture and surviving the 2008 financial crisis. An even larger construction boom has been occurring since the late 2010s, with four buildings eclipsing 200 Central Avenue in height since 2018: One St. Petersburg, Saltaire, Art House, and 400 Central.

== History ==
Number of buildings by height in St. Petersburg by the end of each year, based on the information in this article. Click on the legend to toggle a specific height on or off. View chart definition.

== Map of tallest buildings ==
The map below shows the location of buildings taller than 200 ft (61 m) in St. Petersburg, all of which are in or near the city's downtown. Each marker is numbered by the building's height rank, and colored by the decade of its completion.

Buildings taller than 200 ft (61 m) in St. Petersburg, Florida.
- 1970s
- 1980s
- 1990s
- 2000s
- 2010s
- 2020s
1 400 Central
2 One St. Petersburg
3 Art House
4 Saltaire
5 200 Central Avenue
6 Signature Place
7 Ascent St. Petersburg
8 Ovation
9 Parkshore Plaza
10 Bayfront Plaza
11 400 Beach Drive
12 First Central Tower
13 The Nolen
14 The Florencia
15 Morgan Stanley Tower
16 Evo Apartments
17 Duke Energy Office Building
18 Plaza Tower
19 Camden Pier District
20 Modera St. Petersburg
21 Bliss
22 Reflection St. Pete

== Tallest buildings ==
This list ranks completed buildings in St. Petersburg that stand at least 200 ft (61 m) tall as of 2026, based on standard height measurement. This includes spires and architectural details but does not include antenna masts. The “Year” column indicates the year of completion. Buildings tied in height are sorted by year of completion with earlier buildings ranked first, and then alphabetically.

Was the tallest building in St. Petersburg upon completion
Topped out but not yet completed

Rank	Name	Image	Location	Height ft (m)	Floors	Year	Purpose	Notes
1	400 Central		27°46′15″N 82°38′20″W	515 (157)	46	2025	Residential	Tallest building in St. Petersburg since 2025 and the tallest structure in Pinellas County. Tallest building completed in St. Petersburg in the 2020s.
2	One St. Petersburg		27°46′18″N 82°38′03″W	456 (139)	41	2018	Mixed-use	Tallest building in St. Petersburg from 2018 to 2025. Mixed-use residential and hotel building. Tallest building in St. Petersburg completed in the 2010s.
3	Art House	—	27°46′15″N 82°38′12″W	450 (137.1)	42	2025	Residential	
4	Saltaire		27°46′06″N 82°38′05″W	408 (124.4)	35	2023	Residential	
5	200 Central Avenue		27°46′14″N 82°38′09″W	386 (117.7)	28	1990	Office	Tallest building in St. Petersburg from 1990 to 2018. Tallest building completed in St. Petersburg in the 1990s. Originally known as One Progress Plaza and previously known as the Bank of America Tower and Priatek Plaza.
6	Signature Place		27°46′11″N 82°38′04″W	381 (116.1)	36	2009	Residential	Tallest residential building in St. Petersburg from 2009 to 2018. Tallest building completed in St. Petersburg in the 2000s.
7	Ascent St. Petersburg		27°46′21″N 82°38′10″W	378 (115.2)	36	2024	Residential	Mixed-use residential and hotel building with an AC Marriott Hotel.
8	3rd & 3rd	—	27°46′08″N 82°38′15″W	375 (114)	33	2026	Residential	Topped out in 2026
9	Ovation		27°46′23″N 82°38′01″W	358 (109.1)	26	2009	Residential	
10	Parkshore Plaza		27°46′31″N 82°37′59″W	355 (108.2)	29	2006	Residential	
11	Bayfront Plaza		27°46′15″N 82°38′01″W	333 (101.5)	29	1975	Residential	Tallest building in St. Petersburg from 1975 to 1990. Tallest building in St. Petersburg completed in the 1970s.
12	400 Beach Drive		27°46′38″N 82°37′56″W	316 (96.3)	29	2007	Residential	Also referred to as '400 Beach'.
13	First Central Tower	—	27°46′15″N 82°38′17″W	300 (91.4)	17	1984	Office	Tallest building in St. Petersburg completed in the 1980s.
14	The Nolen	—	27°46′34″N 82°38′00″W	288 (87.8)	23	2025	Residential	
15	The Florencia	—	27°46′21″N 82°38′01″W	275 (83.8)	23	2000	Residential	
16	Morgan Stanley Tower		27°46′23″N 82°38′07″W	266 (81)	17	1985	Office	Previously known as the Wachovia Bank Building, Wells Fargo Plaza, SouthTrust Bank Building, and Bank of Florida Tower.
17	Evo Apartments	—	27°46′09″N 82°38′15″W	250 (76.2)	23	2023	Residential	
18	Duke Energy Office Building		27°46′21″N 82°38′12″W	234 (71.3)	16	2007	Office	Originally known as the Progress Energy Office Building.
19	Plaza Tower		27°46′27″N 82°38′00″W	210 (64)	15	1978	Office	
20	Camden Pier District	—	27°46′03″N 82°38′12″W	208 (63) (Note: Sources do not state the exact height of this building. This figure was determined using Google Earth by subtracting the altitude of the building's lowest main pedestrian open-air entrance from its highest architectural point.)	18	2016	Residential	Formerly known as AER.
21	Modera St. Petersburg	—	27°46′09″N 82°39′24″W	206 (62.8)	20	2024	Residential	
22	Bliss	—	27°46′34″N 82°37′58″W	204 (62.2)	19	2017	Residential	
23	Reflection St. Pete	—	27°46′32″N 82°38′39″W	200 (61)	18	2024	Residential	

== Tallest under construction or proposed ==
=== Under construction ===
The following table includes buildings under construction in St. Petersburg that are planned to be at least 200 ft (61 m) tall as of 2026, based on standard height measurement. The “Year” column indicates the expected year of completion. Buildings that are on hold are not included.

Name	Height ft (m)	Floors	Year	Purpose	Notes
275 5th Street South	–	24	2028	Residential	

=== Proposed ===
The following table includes approved and proposed buildings in St. Petersburg that are planned to be at least 200 ft (61 m) tall as of 2026, based on standard height measurement. The “Year” column indicates the expected year of completion. Buildings that are on hold are not included.

Name	Height ft (m)	Floors	Year	Purpose	Notes
Waldorf Astoria Residences	539 (164)	50	2026	Residential	
333 1st Street South Tower 1	509 (155)	44	—	Residential	
333 1st Street South Tower 2	509 (155)	44	—	Residential	
Roche Bobois St. Pete Tower	375 (114)	29	2029	Residential	
450 1st Ave N	330 (101)	28	—	Residential	
Trails Edge Apartments	299 (91)	23	—	Residential	
511 3rd Avenue South	285 (87)	22	—	Residential	
The Pelican	221 (67)	21	—	Residential	
Abacus Tower	212 (65)	21	—	Residential	
Lecesse Tower	212 (65)	18	—	Residential	
Sky St. Pete	212 (65)	20	—	Residential	
234 3rd Avenue North	—	28	—	Residential	
3rd Ave N & 5th Street Tower	—	23	—	Residential	
699 1st Avenue North	—	21	—	Residential	

== Timeline of tallest buildings ==
This lists buildings that once held the title of the tallest building in St. Petersburg.

Name	Image	Years as tallest	Height ft (m)	Floors	References
Bayfront Plaza		1975–1990	333 (101.5)	29	
200 Central Avenue		1990–2018	386 (117.7)	28	
One St. Petersburg		2018–2025	456 (139)	41	
400 Central		2025–present	515 (157)	46	

== See also ==
- List of tallest buildings in Florida
- List of tallest buildings in Fort Lauderdale
- List of tallest buildings in Jacksonville
- List of tallest buildings in Miami
- List of tallest buildings in Miami Beach
- List of tallest buildings in Orlando
- List of tallest buildings in Sunny Isles Beach
- List of tallest buildings in Tampa
