= Dexter's and Trooper's Laws =

Dexter's Law and Trooper's Law

Florida Legislature
- Citation: SB 150 (Trooper's Law); HB 255 (Dexter's Law)
- Territorial extent: Florida
- Assented to: May 28, 2025
- Effective: July 1, 2025 (Dexter's Law); October 1, 2025 (Trooper's Law)

Summary
- Increases and expands punishments for animal cruelty

Keywords
- Animal cruelty
- Status: In force

Trooper's Law (SB 150) and Dexter's Law (HB 255) are a pair of animal rights laws signed into Florida law by Governor Ron DeSantis on May 28, 2025. The two laws expanded penalties for animal abuse in response to two cases of dogs being abused by owners in the state.

== Background ==
=== Dexter ===
Dexter was a dog found on May 14, 2024, decapitated in a plastic bag in Fort De Soto Park. The dog was adopted from the Pinellas County Animal Shelter a few days prior. His owner, Domingo Rodriguez, was found guilty of animal cruelty on February 14, 2025.

=== Trooper ===
Trooper is a Bull Terrier that was found on the side of Interstate 75 restrained to a fence before Hurricane Milton impacted Florida. Giovanny Aldama Garcia, Trooper's owner, was arrested in October 2024, accused of animal cruelty. Trooper was found by a member of the Florida Highway Patrol, from which he derived his name. Trooper was adopted in December 2024.

== Legislative history ==
In the Florida Senate, Trooper's Law was sponsored by Don Gaetz and filed January 7. It was unanimously passed by the Senate in March 2024. Dexter's Law was sponsored by Linda Chaney in the Florida House of Representatives.

The two laws were signed by Governor Ron DeSantis on May 28, 2025.

Dexter's Law took effect July 1, 2025. Trooper's Law took effect October 1, 2025.

== Provisions ==
Trooper's Law makes restraining pets prior to natural disasters a third-degree felony. The punishment is jail time up to five years and a $10,000 fine.

Dexter's Law creates a registry of animal abusers and requires law enforcement to post online the names of those who have offended animal cruelty laws. It also increases the punishment for severe cruelty to animals. A 1.25 multiplier is to be added to the punishment of those charged with aggravated animal cruelty. The registry of animal abusers went online January 1, 2026.
