= Hurricane Milton =

Category 5 Atlantic hurricane in 2024

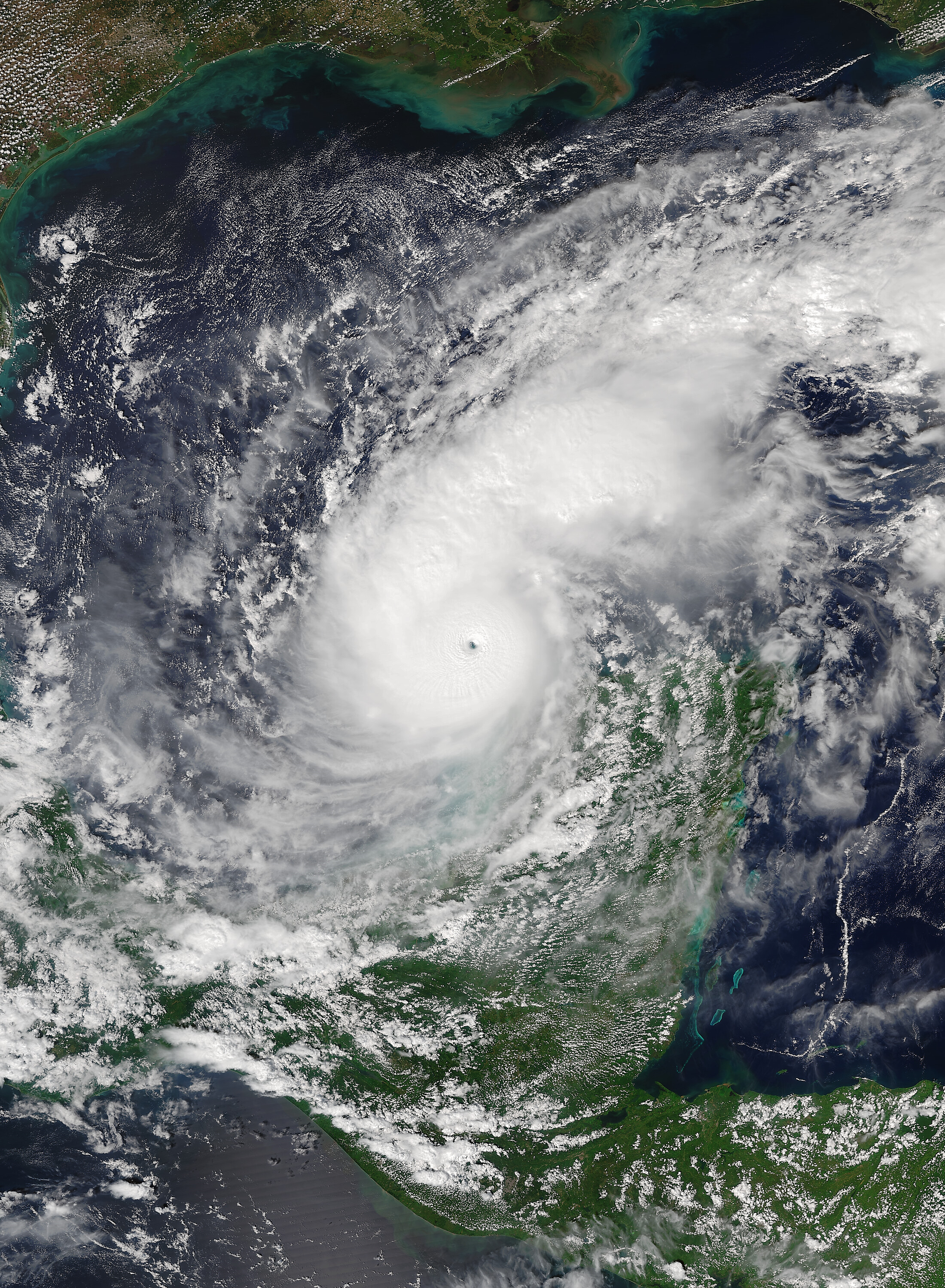
- Milton at peak intensity just north of the Yucatán Peninsula on October 7

Meteorological history
- Formed: October 5, 2024
- Extratropical: October 10, 2024
- Dissipated: October 12, 2024

Category 5 major hurricane
- 1-minute sustained (SSHWS/NWS)
- Highest winds: 180 mph (285 km/h)
- Lowest pressure: 895 mbar (hPa); 26.43 inHg (Tied for lowest recorded in the Gulf of Mexico)

Overall effects
- Fatalities: 45 total
- Missing: 6
- Damage: $34.4 billion (2024 USD)
- Areas affected: Eastern Mexico; Northern Yucatán Peninsula; Western Cuba; Southeastern United States (particularly Florida; Georgia, coastal South Carolina); Northern Bahamas
- Part of the 2024 Atlantic hurricane season
- Effects: Tornado outbreak; Aftermath: Misinformation; Other wikis: Commons: Milton images

Hurricane Milton was an extremely powerful and destructive tropical cyclone which caused major damage and fatalities in Florida in October 2024. It is tied with 2005's Hurricane Rita for the most intense Atlantic hurricane ever recorded in the Gulf of Mexico. Milton significantly impacted the west coast of the U.S. state of Florida, less than two weeks after Hurricane Helene devastated the state's Big Bend region; further exacerbating damage and hindering clean-up efforts in previously affected regions. The thirteenth named storm, ninth hurricane, fourth major hurricane, and second Category 5 hurricane of the extremely active 2024 Atlantic hurricane season, Milton was the strongest tropical cyclone to occur worldwide in 2024. The hurricane also spawned a deadly tornado outbreak in one of the most intense tropical cyclone-produced outbreaks recorded. Total damages as a result of Milton were estimated to be $34.3 billion (2024 USD), making it the ninth-costliest Atlantic hurricane on record.

Milton formed from a complex of factors, beginning with a long-tracked tropical wave that moved off the coast of Africa in mid-September 2024. After reaching the western Caribbean Sea and interacting with a broad Central American gyre, it then consolidated in the Bay of Campeche and became a tropical depression on October 5, becoming a tropical storm shortly after. Gradual intensification occurred as it slowly moved eastward, becoming a hurricane early on October 7. Later that day, Milton underwent explosive intensification and became a Category 5 hurricane with winds of 180 mph (285 km/h). At peak intensity, it had a pressure of 895 millibars (26.43 inHg), making it, at the time, the fourth-most intense Atlantic hurricane on record, tying the pressure record in the Gulf of Mexico with Rita in 2005. Milton weakened to a Category 4 hurricane after an eyewall replacement cycle and reintensified into a Category 5 hurricane the following day. Increasing wind shear caused the hurricane to weaken as it turned northeast towards Florida, falling to Category 3 status before making landfall near Siesta Key late on October 9. Afterwards, Milton rapidly weakened as it moved across the state into the Atlantic Ocean. It became extratropical on October 10 as it became embedded within a frontal zone. The remnants gradually weakened and passed near the island of Bermuda before becoming indistinguishable and dissipating on October 12.

The hurricane killed a total of 45 people: 42 in the United States, and 3 in Mexico as Milton passed north of there, where preparations were taken due to its close proximity. Damage caused in Mexico and the Yucatan Peninsula wasn't as severe, with flooding and heavy rainfall being the primary impacts. Ahead of Milton, Florida declared a state of emergency in which many coastal residents were ordered to evacuate. Cleanup efforts from Helene over a week prior were affected in order to ensure the safety of citizens. Milton brought a major storm surge of up to 10 ft (120 in) to areas just to the south of the Tampa Bay, including Siesta Key; due to the southward track, the Tampa metropolitan area avoided a worst-case scenario, and instead observed a reverse storm surge. High wind gusts and very heavy rainfall caused significant flooding and infrastructural damage across central Florida, particularly near Tampa and around the point of landfall, where most damage from Milton occurred. In the aftermath of the storm, partially as a result of the proximity to the 2024 United States presidential election in November and clean-up efforts from Helene, misinformation spread across affected communities about the nature of the storms and about rescue operations conducted by the Federal Emergency Management Agency (FEMA).

== Meteorological history ==
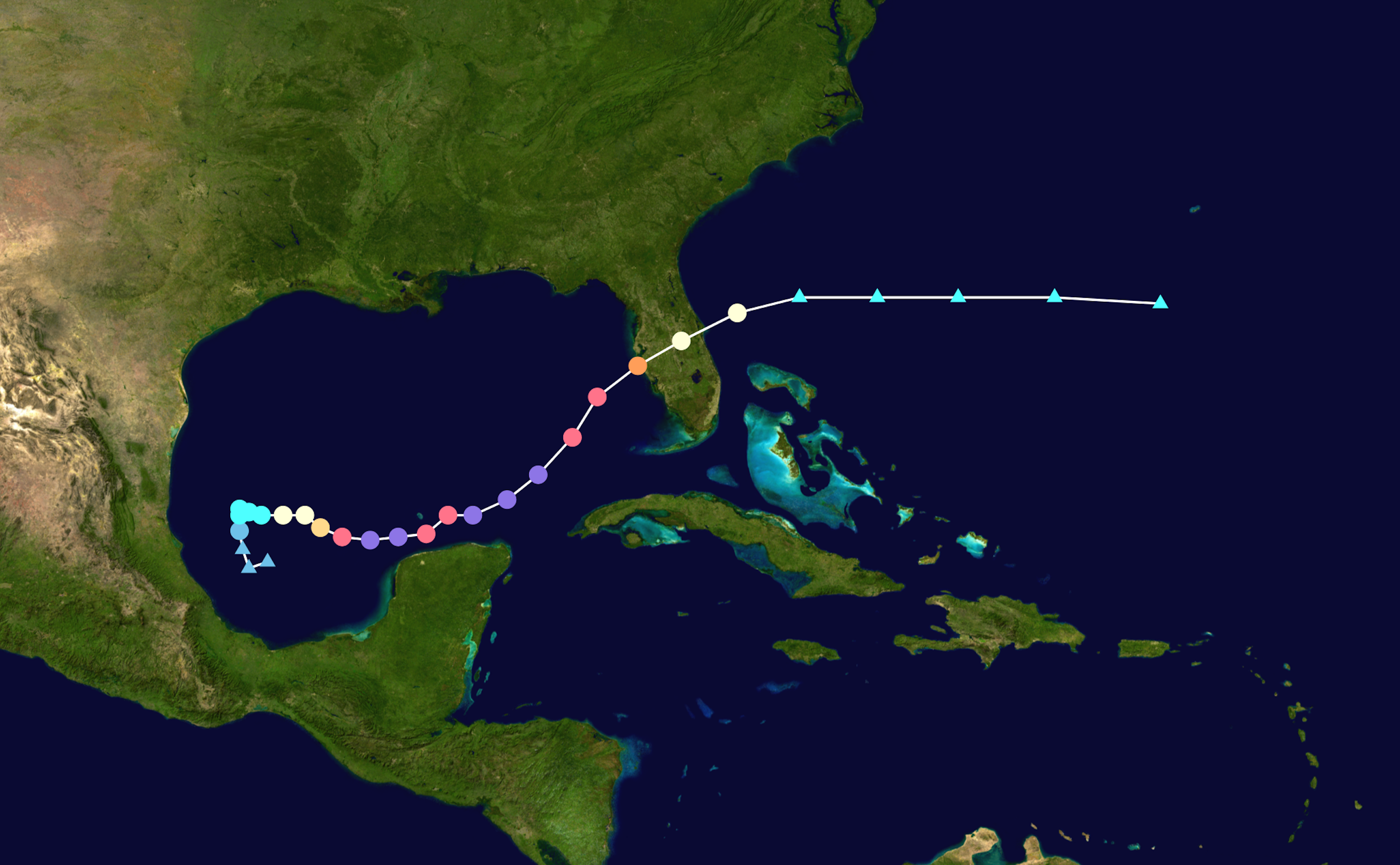
Map plotting the storm's track and intensity, according to the Saffir–Simpson scale Map key Saffir–Simpson scale Tropical depression (≤38 mph, ≤62 km/h) Tropical storm (39–73 mph, 63–118 km/h) Category 1 (74–95 mph, 119–153 km/h) Category 2 (96–110 mph, 154–177 km/h) Category 3 (111–129 mph, 178–208 km/h) Category 4 (130–156 mph, 209–251 km/h) Category 5 (≥157 mph, ≥252 km/h) Unknown Storm type Tropical cyclone Subtropical cyclone Extratropical cyclone, remnant low, tropical disturbance, or monsoon depression

The origins of Milton were complex and involved several areas of low pressure during the second half of September and beginning of October 2024. A tropical wave first moved off the western coast of Africa on September 14 with little convection and moved very slowly westward. The wave then interacted with two other disturbances to its west near the Cabo Verde Islands on September 18, still with little to no convection, with the combined system becoming slightly better organized by September 22. By September 26, as the wave passed through the Lesser Antilles, the National Hurricane Center (NHC) began outlining an area for possible development of the disturbance once it reached the western Caribbean Sea. The wave then interacted with a Central American gyre (CAG), a broad area of low pressure centered over Central America–which earlier had contributed to the formations of Hurricane Helene and Hurricane John in the Eastern Pacific–before the combined system degenerated to a broad trough on October 1. The southern end of this disturbance then interacted with the remnants of an unnamed tropical storm in the Eastern Pacific Ocean and a stationary front, and consolidated in the Bay of Campeche. By October 4, showing more signs of development, it was designated Invest 92L. Continued organization led to the formation of a tropical depression by 12:00 UTC on October 5, about 135 mi (217 km) east of Tampico, Mexico. Satellite wind data indicated the storm was producing gale-force winds six hours later, leading the NHC to upgrade the system to Tropical Storm Milton. Milton's radius of tropical storm-force winds was only 30 nautical miles (56 km), marking it as a relatively small storm.

Most intense Atlantic hurricanes
Rank	Hurricane	Season	Pressure	
Rank	Hurricane	Season	hPa	inHg
1	Wilma	2005	882	26.05
2	Gilbert	1988	888	26.23
3	"Labor Day"	1935	892	26.34
3	Melissa	2025	892	26.34
5	Rita	2005	895	26.43
5	Milton	2024	895	26.43
7	Allen	1980	899	26.55
8	Camille	1969	900	26.58
9	Katrina	2005	902	26.64
10	Mitch	1998	905	26.73
10	Dean	2007	905	26.73
Source: HURDAT

Milton initially moved slowly northwards, before further poleward movement ceased as a result of a ridge of high pressure building to its north and the development of a frontal low along the aforementioned front in the northwestern Gulf of Mexico. Spiral banding and consistent bursts of convection continued through the early morning of October 6, fostering further strengthening. By that afternoon, Hurricane Hunters had found that Milton had intensified into a hurricane, with an intermittent eye feature. At this point, almost all tropical cyclone forecast models, including the Statistical Hurricane Intensity Prediction Scheme (SHIPS) were explicitly forecasting very high chances of rapid strengthening to high-end intensities, with NHC forecaster Eric Blake describing the guidance as "bullish as [I've] seen in this part of the basin." Overnight, Milton commenced a period of explosive intensification, enabled by highly favorable environmental conditions consisting of very warm sea surface temperatures (SSTs) near 31 °C (88 °F), high mid-level relative humidity values and low wind shear. A pinhole eye measuring 4 nautical miles (7 km) soon developed within very deep convection of around −80 °C (−112 °F), with Milton becoming a major hurricane by 11:00 UTC on October 7 and soon after a Category 5 hurricane by 16:00 UTC on October 7, making it the second Category 5 hurricane of the season. At one point during this period, Hurricane Hunters measured a 13 mb (0.38 inHg) drop, from 925 mb (27.3 inHg) to 912 mb (26.9 inHg) in only an hour. Based on the continued extreme intensification rate and later data, it is estimated Milton reached its peak intensity at 20:00 UTC that day with maximum sustained winds of 180 mph (285 km/h) and a minimum central pressure of 895 mbar (26.43 inHg), the most intense since Wilma in 2005, and tied with Hurricane Rita as the fifth-most intense Atlantic hurricane on record. However, in their post-analysis report, the NHC stated that this intensity had a greater than normal degree of uncertainty. (Note: The uncertainty of Milton's peak intensity arises from the hurricane peaking in between center fixes. At 17:00 UTC, an Air Force Hurricane Hunter aircraft observed a minimum pressure of 912 mb (26.9 inHg) and flight-level winds of 182 mph (293 km/h), which equates to a surface wind estimate of 165 mph (266 km/h). By the time the next eye penetration occurred at 22:21 UTC, Milton's satellite presentation had begun to degrade due to an imminent eyewall replacement cycle, however Hurricane Hunters measured slightly higher flight-level winds of 185 mph (298 km/h), rounding down to similar intensities, and a lower pressure of 897 mb (26.5 inHg). The peak was chosen when the satellite presentation was determined to be the greatest, at 20:00 UTC based on the aforementioned trends. Dropwindsonde data also indicated surface wind speeds near 185 mph (298 km/h).) In the 17-hour period from 03:00 UTC to 20:00 UTC October 7, the pressure fell from 977 mbar (28.85 inHg) to 895 mbar (26.43 inHg), a drop of 82 mb (2.42 inHg), while the winds increased by 90 mph (145 km/h) in the same time period. This was also the third-fastest period of rapid intensification in the Atlantic after Wilma and Hurricane Felix, and the fastest in the Gulf of Mexico.

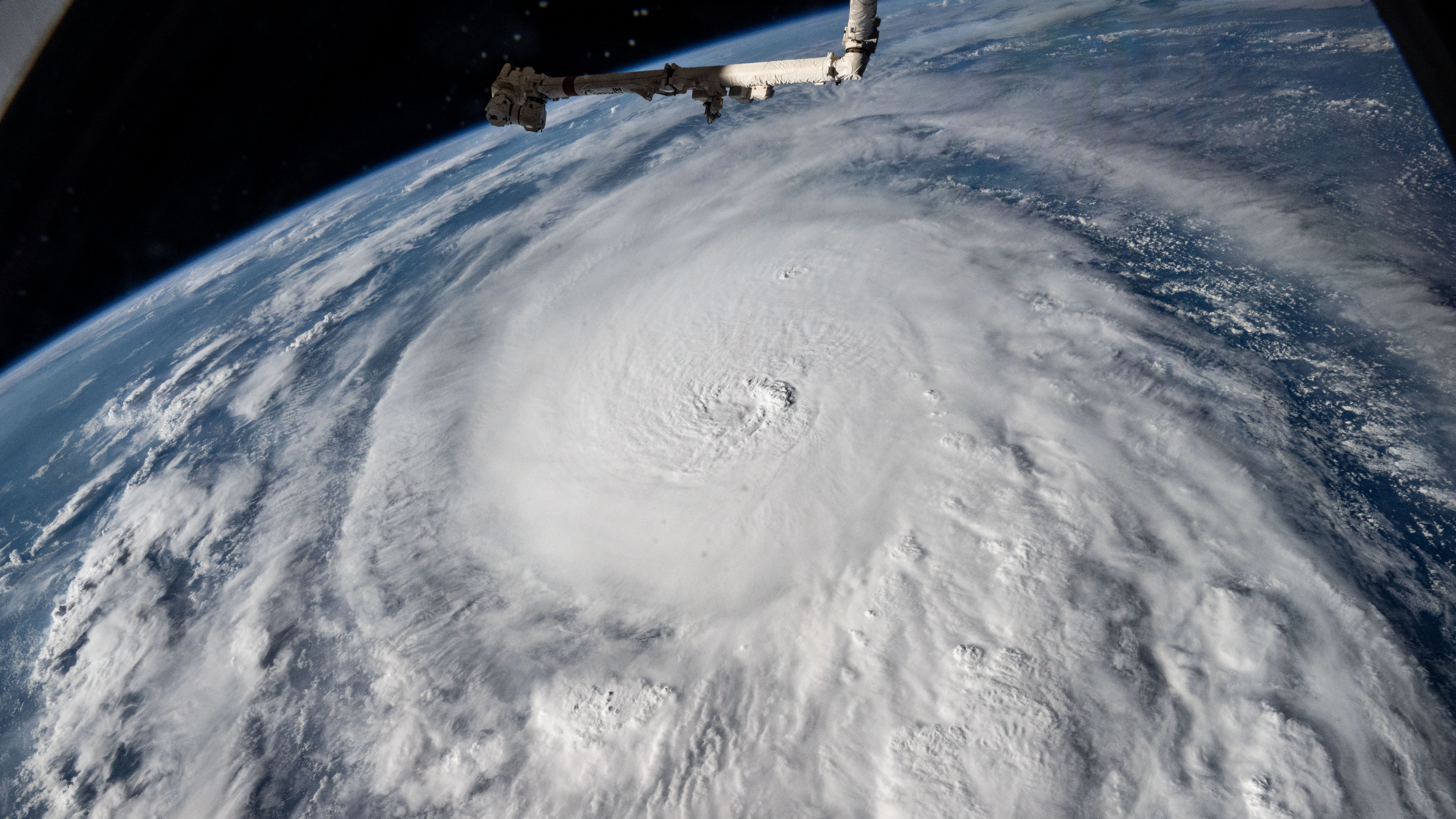
Hurricane Milton near the Yucatán Peninsula from the International Space Station on October 8

After peaking in intensity, further strengthening was halted by an eyewall replacement cycle, causing the storm to rapidly weaken to Category 4 intensity later that night, but a larger eye became increasingly well-defined, and Milton re-achieved Category 5 intensity by the afternoon of October 8, by which time the hurricane had undergone a second round of rapid deepening to a secondary peak with winds of 165 mph (270 km/h) and a pressure of 902 mbar (26.64 inHg) at 22:05 UTC on October 8. By this time, it began to turn towards the northeast and accelerate from the trough steering it towards Florida. The next day, October 9, Milton briefly weakened to a Category 4 hurricane before reaching Category 5 intensity for the third time at 08:25 UTC, with maximum winds of 160 mph (260 km/h) and a pressure of 907 mbar (26.78 inHg). A few hours later, increasing wind shear began to affect Milton, and the storm fell below Category 5 intensity early that morning. The eye of the hurricane became cloud-filled and increasingly ill-defined while the convection became more ragged-looking as strong southwesterly wind shear of 35–40 mph (56–65 km/h) overtook the hurricane. Milton made landfall at about 00:30 UTC on October 10 (8:30 p.m. local time on October 9) near Siesta Key, Florida, as a Category 3 hurricane with winds of 115 mph (185 km/h). However, the strongest winds associated with Milton did not reach the coast until about 90 minutes after the center moved ashore by which point the storm had weakened further. Milton quickly weakened over land and emerged over the Atlantic Ocean as a Category 1 hurricane while also becoming increasingly entangled within a nearby frontal boundary. On the afternoon of October 10, it transitioned to a hurricane-force extratropical low; and proceeded to gradually spin down and become increasingly diffuse as it passed near Bermuda, dissipating early on October 12.

=== Influence of climate change ===
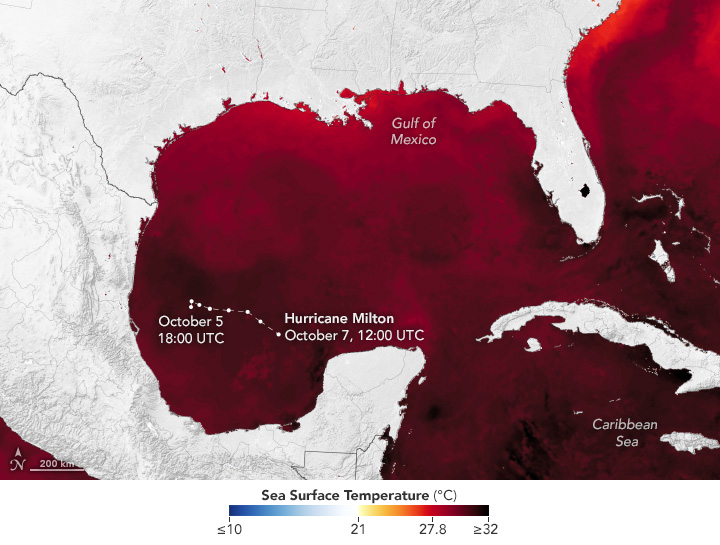
Map of the extremely warm sea surface temperatures that enabled Milton's rapid intensification, overlaid with its path through 12:00 UTC on October 7

According to scientists from Climate Central, the abnormally high sea surface temperature, which enabled the fast intensification of the hurricane, was made 400–800 times more probable due to climate change, based on the group's Climate Shift Index: Ocean (Ocean CSI) model. Scientists from the World Weather Attribution center calculated that 1 day rainfall events as those happened during the hurricane produce 20–30% more rain due to climate change while the wind speed of the hurricane increased by 10%. Using statistical modeling, the scientists hypothesized that "without climate change Milton would have made landfall as a Category 2 instead of a Category 3 storm".

== Preparations ==
=== Mexico ===
On October 6, 2024, the Mexican government issued a tropical storm watch for the northern coast of the Yucatán Peninsula, from Celestún to Cancún. The watch was upgraded to tropical storm warnings and hurricane watches later in the day, then hurricane warnings the following day. Some 2,711 people voluntarily evacuated from Isla Holbox, Quintana Roo Governor Mara Lezama reported. The Federal Electricity Commission (CFE) mobilized hundreds of workers and pieces of equipment to be placed in Campeche, Yucatán, and Quintana Roo in preparation for Milton. The Secretariat of the Navy announced that the Mexican Navy would be distributed around affected regions for distribution of resources. Services on the Tren Maya were suspended.

Panic buying was observed in Mérida ahead of the storm. Non-essential government services, including public transportation, were suspended in parts of Yucatán as Milton rapidly intensified on October 7. Governor Joaquín Díaz Mena ordered the closure of all schools and ports in Yucatán.

=== United States ===
==== Florida ====
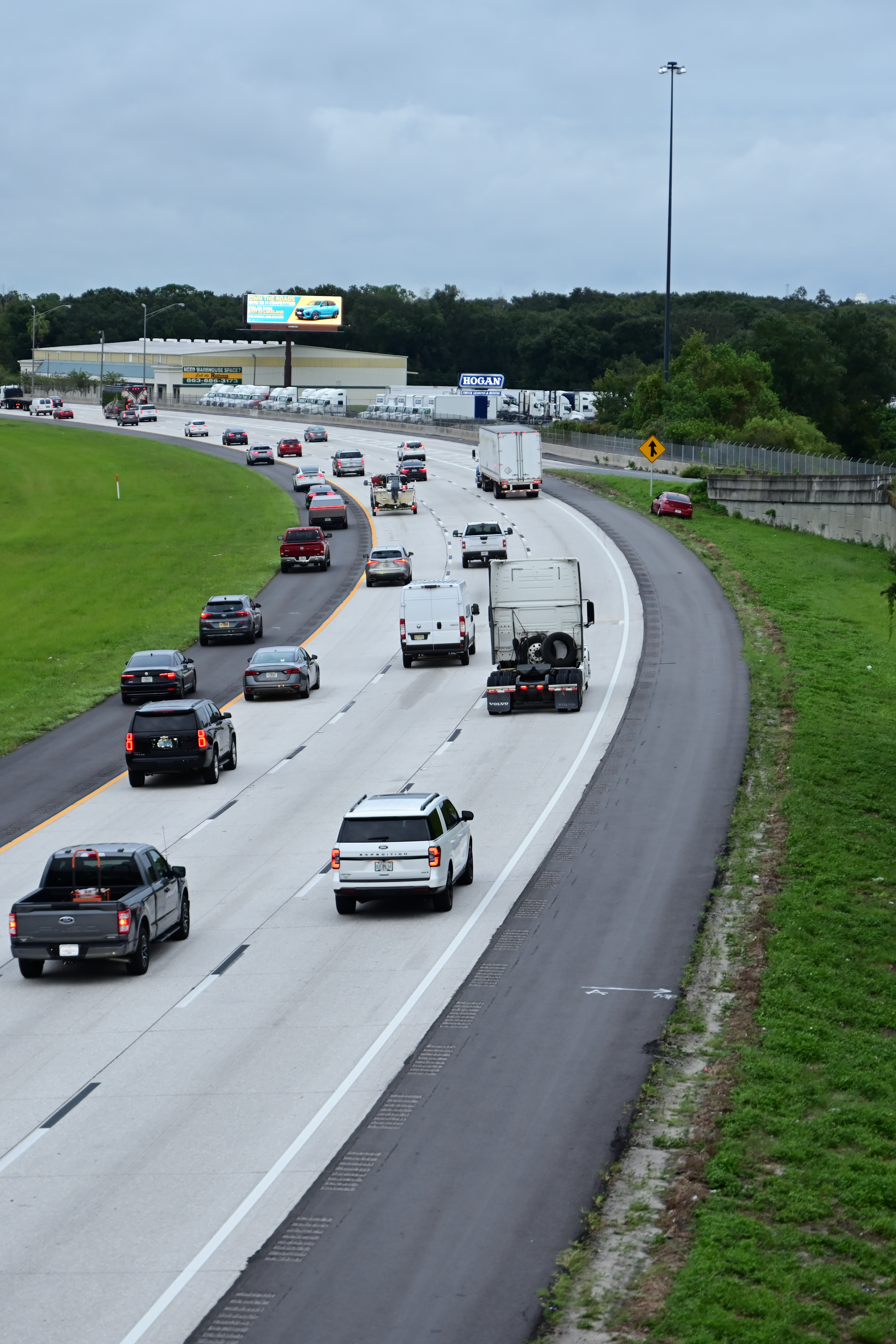
Emergency shoulder use (left shoulder only) on eastbound I-4 near Lakeland on October 7

On October 5, Florida Governor Ron DeSantis declared a state of emergency. He also issued an executive order requiring debris management sites and landfills in counties affected by Hurricane Helene to remain open around the clock to help remove debris before Milton made landfall. The order also increased the number of Florida National Guardsmen working on debris removal from 800 to 4,000 to keep debris becoming a hazard in Milton's high winds. Dump trucks were deployed to help remove mounds of debris. Sandbagging sites opened across the state.

Two days later, hurricane and tropical storm warnings were declared for the Florida West Coast, nearly 15 million people across Florida were under flood watches, and President Joe Biden approved an emergency declaration for the state. DeSantis ordered the Florida Department of Transportation and the Florida Division of Emergency Management to coordinate resources. He suspended tolls on many roads in western Florida, including Florida's Turnpike. Public schools in over 50 counties as well as 23 public colleges and universities across the state canceled classes or were closed, including the University of South Florida in Tampa and Florida Gulf Coast University in Lee County near Fort Myers. Rollins College evacuated campus. Several counties opened schools up as emergency shelters.

Amtrak suspended its Silver Service between Jacksonville and Miami from October 7 to 11 and canceled the Auto Train from October 8 to 10. Many airports throughout the state, particularly in Central and Southwest Florida, temporarily closed during the storm including Tampa International Airport, Sarasota–Bradenton International Airport, St. Pete–Clearwater International Airport, Palm Beach International Airport, and Orlando International Airport. Thousands of flights intending to arrive or depart from Florida were canceled. Several cruise lines had their schedule affected due to the storm. The October 7 launch of Hera occurred as planned, but the launch of the Europa Clipper spacecraft was delayed. SpaceX Crew-8's return was postponed to October 13. Brightline operations were suspended between West Palm Beach and Orlando station from October 8 to 10. Legoland Florida and Walt Disney World closed due to Milton. Starting on October 8, Busch Gardens Tampa Bay was to close for three days.

An estimated six million Floridians were ordered to evacuate, marking one of the largest evacuation orders since Hurricane Irma in 2017. The evacuation orders were primarily situated in Hillsborough and surrounding counties. Volusia and Marion counties also issued evacuation orders for homes at risk. Throughout the Tampa Bay area, comfort stations and locations to do basic utilities that were opened due to Helene were closed due to Milton. In Longboat Key, officials stated that residents should evacuate from the town. In coordination with the Florida Division of Emergency Management, Uber offered free rides to and from state shelters.

Zoos such as the Florida Aquarium, the Palm Beach Zoo, and ZooTampa activated their emergency plans and moved animals into higher ground locations or secure areas such as bathrooms. A few of the workers planned on staying at the zoos to continue to monitor the animals, feed them and provide care if needed. Some national organizations such as Wings of Rescue and Best Friends Animal Society, worked with others to evacuate shelter animals to partner shelters in other states.

The National Hockey League canceled the preseason finale for the Tampa Bay Lightning, which was initially postponed from Helene. Additionally, the Lightning's season-opener against the Carolina Hurricanes on October 12 was postponed. All University of Central Florida sporting events scheduled for October 9 and 10 were canceled as well. The South Florida Bulls football game against the Memphis Tigers was postponed from October 11 to 12 and moved from Tampa to Camping World Stadium in Orlando.

The National Football League's Tampa Bay Buccaneers relocated to New Orleans ahead of their game against the New Orleans Saints on October 13. Publix and Walmart altered store hours and closed several other of their locations in preparation for the storm and their locations among other stores faced shortages of items such as bottled water, alcohol, canned goods, and snacks due to panic buying. Gas station shortages occurred across the state, with 16.5% out by the afternoon of October 8, including 43% in the Tampa Bay area according to GasBuddy. Governor DeSantis said fuel replenishment efforts were underway and said that there was not a fuel shortage. The Florida Highway Patrol began escorting fuel tankers to help replenish gas stations ahead of landfall to aid in evacuation efforts. DeSantis also urged that people consider evacuating "tens of miles" instead of "hundreds of miles". The American Automobile Association advised Floridians to "take only what you need" and to avoid letting their gas tanks getting too low before looking for a place to fill up. Thirty-three Waffle House locations in Milton's projected path were closed, indicating a red level on the Waffle House Index.

President Joe Biden postponed a planned trip from October 10 to 15 to Angola and Germany to oversee preparations and the response. He urged those living in areas at risk to evacuate, saying that it was a matter of life and death.

The Federal Emergency Management Agency (FEMA) suffered a staffing shortage ahead of the storm, with only 9% of the agency's staff available. According to Homeland Security Secretary Alejandro Mayorkas, the agency remained ready to respond, saying that "we can respond to multiple events at a single time". Over the previous five years at least 25% of staff remained available by October 7. This figure was lower than in 2017 when FEMA's staff availability dropped to 19% as FEMA staff responded to Hurricane Harvey, Hurricane Irma, and Hurricane Maria. Press Secretary Karine Jean-Pierre ended a briefing, accusing journalists of spreading misinformation related to disaster funding.

There were casualties involved as a result of evacuating: one fatality occurred after a car accident in Marion County southeast of Orange Lake, while three people were injured after the plane they were in crashed into Tampa Bay after its engine failed while taking off from Albert Whitted Airport in St. Petersburg. In addition, two people died on eastbound SR 82 while evacuating.

==== Georgia ====
Coastal Georgia was placed under a tropical storm warning. On October 7, 2024, Atlanta Motor Speedway opened its campground for evacuees with pop-up campers and tents with access to a complementary shower house, including those from Florida, in collaboration with the Henry County Emergency Management Agency. A limited number of camping spaces with water, power, and sewer hook-ups were made available as well.

On October 8, Georgia Governor Brian Kemp issued an executive order which declared a state of emergency across 40 counties and ordered the Georgia Emergency Management and Homeland Security Agency to activate the Georgia Emergency Operations Plan and Georgia Department of Transportation and Georgia Department of Public Safety to take action to ensure the expeditious movement of utility vehicles, equipment, and personnel throughout the state to eliminate any potential power outages. The order also called up to 250 Georgia National Guard troops to be used in preparation, response, and recovery efforts. Cumberland Island National Seashore closed indefinitely on October 8.

=== The Bahamas ===
A tropical storm watch was issued for Extreme Northwest Bahamian Islands on October 8, 2024, upgraded six hours later to a tropical storm warning. Grand Bahama activated their emergency operations center. The Royal Bahamas Defence Force went on standby with supplies prepared for Hurricane Milton. In-person schools on Grand Bahama, Bimini, Abaco, and Grand Cay were closed. The Anglican Central Education Authority closed two campuses. Bahamian students in Florida were ordered to evacuate; Bahamasair made two flights on October 7 and 8 to Orlando. The Grand Bahama International Airport had closed. Bahamas Power and Light offices in northern islands closed October 9. Banks on Grand Bahama and Abaco closed October 10. A large surge in sales of hurricane-related supplies occurred.

== Impact ==
Casualties and damage by country
Area	Deaths (Missing)	Damage cost (USD)	Ref
Yucatán, Mexico	3 (6)	$61.2–$81.4 million	
Florida, U.S.A.	42 (0)	>$34.3 billion	
Total	45 (6)	$34.4 billion	

=== Mexico ===
Heavy rainfall from Milton caused flooding in the city of Campeche. Dangerous storm surge and torrential rainfall impacted the state of Yucatán, with the seawall at Progreso being inundated by high waves. Over 12,000 people were affected in the state by power outages. Flooding from the storm surge led to evacuations being carried out during the hurricane in Celestún. Strong waves caused sections of the Ciudad del Carmen–Isla Aguada federal highway to be inundated by sea waters. A man and a woman drowned in Calkiní due to waves produced by the hurricane. Heavy winds from Milton caused an old house in Progreso to collapse, and heavy winds and rainfall nearly demolished a home in Chuburná. Losses are estimated at Mex$1.2–1.6 billion (US$61.2–81.4 million).

The municipalities of Sisal and Celestún suffered the most damage, with flooding, fallen trees, and blackouts affecting the cities. Milton also modified the salinity of mangrove forests within the vicinity. In Dzilam de Bravo, beaches were inundated with algae. In Sisal, there were reports of some roofs of softball field stands and palapas collapsing. Over a thousand people from El Cuyo, Río Lagartos, and Las Coloradas needed to be transferred to shelters. Heavy swells and intense winds from Milton destroyed the dock of the port of Chelem. Cancún International Airport canceled several flights due to Milton.

Fifteen fishermen on four boats from Progreso went missing while out on the water as Milton passed. Two of the boats, carrying eight fishermen, returned on October 9. Another missing boat, Peyucsa 12, was spotted a day later from a Mexican Navy plane, overturned about 133 mi (214 km) northeast of Progreso with one man on top. The plane was unable to rescue the man, and pilots called for a Defender-class patrol boat from the Mexican Navy to come to his rescue. The man's brother, who was on the search plane, said he saw him slide off the boat and into the water face first, sinking before the rescue boat arrived. The Mexican Navy has not confirmed this account. On October 11, the last missing fishing boat, Halcón I, was spotted by the Mexican Navy, capsized with no crew members on board.

=== Cuba ===
As Milton neared Cuba, its rainbands caused flooding, with the first reports in Surgidero de Batabanó. In Havana Bay, deteriorating weather conditions from Milton caused officials to suspend ferry services on October 8. The Institute of Meteorology (INSMET) reported that Western Cuba experienced winds of 25–30 mph (40–48 km/h) and maximum gusts in Casablanca, Havana, of 50 mph (80 km/h).

=== United States ===
Costliest U.S. Atlantic hurricanes (Note: The storm category color indicates the intensity of the hurricane when landfalling in the U.S.)
Rank	Hurricane	Season	Damage
1	3 Katrina	2005	$125 billion
1	4 Harvey	2017	$125 billion
3	4 Ian	2022	$112 billion
4	4 Maria	2017	$90 billion
5	4 Helene	2024	$78.7 billion
6	4 Ida	2021	$75 billion
7	ET Sandy	2012	$65 billion
8	4 Irma	2017	$52.1 billion
9	3 Milton	2024	$34.3 billion
10	2 Ike	2008	$30 billion

Initial estimates by Fitch Ratings said that Milton caused US$50 billion in damage. Based upon initial estimates of insured losses, Fitch projected that most reinsurance attachment points would likely be met so that most insurances losses would not be borne by primary insurers. A later estimate by CoreLogic stated that Milton caused US$21–34 billion in damage. However, Moody’s Analytics released a much higher cost, at US$85 billion. The NCEI estimate released in January 2025 placed the total cost at US$34.3 billion, almost all of it in Florida. Researchers at Imperial College London, applying extreme event attribution, concluded in October 2024, that 45% of the loss in Florida due to Milton could be attributed to climate change.

==== Florida ====
Sustained winds to hurricane-force were recorded along Florida's peninsular coast. In Venice, sustained winds reached 92 mph (148 km/h) with gusts to 107 mph (172 km/h). Gusts reached 107 mph (172 km/h) in Sarasota. In Marineland, sustained winds reached 83 mph (134 km/h) with gusts to 92 mph (148 km/h). In Daytona Beach, sustained winds reached 60 mph (97 km/h) with gusts reaching 87 mph (140 km/h). Gusts reached 99 mph (159 km/h) in Ponce Inlet, 92 mph (148 km/h) in West Palm Beach and 86 mph (138 km/h) in Orlando.

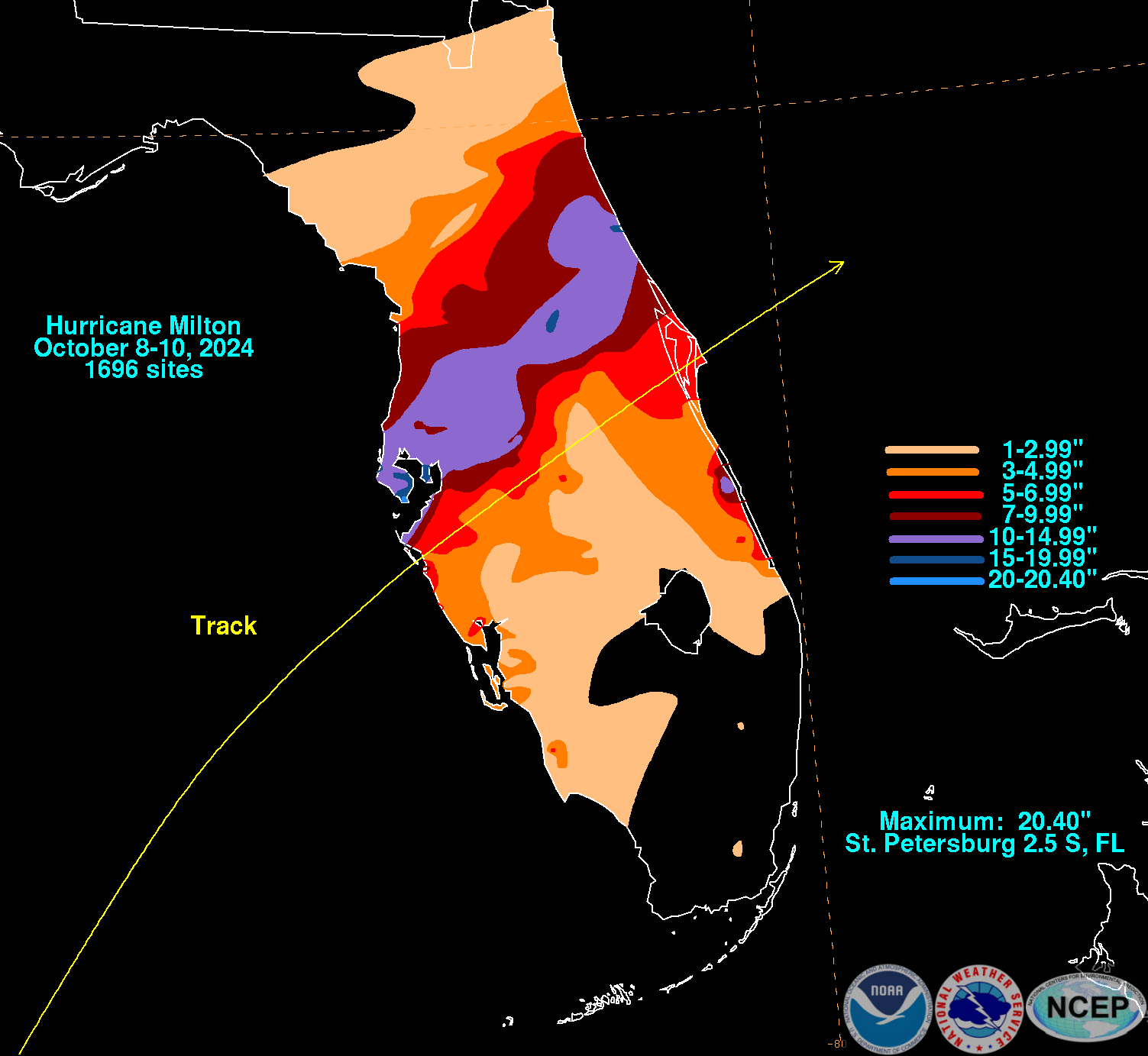
Rainfall map of Milton in Florida.

Heavy rain also occurred in the state, with over 13 in (330 mm) of rain in Plant City and nearly 19 in (480 mm) in St. Petersburg, including 5.09 in (129 mm) in a single hour. In Tampa, nearly 12 in (300 mm) of rain fell, which pushed the city to its wettest year on record. Further east, rainfall totals exceeded 12 in (300 mm) in portions of Volusia County, and 10 in (250 mm) in Indian River County, with 12.92 in (328 mm) of rain in Vero Beach. Rainfall totals in Flagler County were lower, but 5.61 in (142 mm) of rain was still recorded in Flagler Beach. A storm surge of 5 ft (1.52 m) to 10 ft (3.04 m) was recorded from Naples to Siesta Key, including Charlotte Harbor. Water levels rose over 8 ft (2.4 m) near Sarasota. Naples saw a storm surge of 5.75 ft (1.75 m). On the other side of the state, Daytona experienced a storm surge peak between 4 ft (1.2 m) to 4.5 ft (1.37 m). The Hillsborough River crested at nearly 2 ft (.61 m) over record height Friday at Zephyrhills. At the river's Morris Bridge site, it crested over 3 ft (.94 m) above record flood stage. A reverse storm surge occurred in Tampa, however, dropping water levels by 5 ft (1.5 m).

Seven people were killed in St. Lucie County, four in Volusia County, two in Pinellas County, and one each in Citrus, Polk, and Orange counties. One person was killed in Ormond Beach due a tree falling into a roof. A woman in her late 70s was killed by a fallen tree branch in Hillsborough County. One elderly man from Charlotte County died from smoke inhalation in a Bradenton hospital after a golf cart lithium battery exploded at his home due to storm surge flooding. Ten people were injured in Wellington by an EF3 tornado. Another EF3 tornado severely damaged two warehouses and killed six people. The Waffle House Index was raised to red in various areas throughout the state including Tampa, Lakeland, Daytona, and Naples.

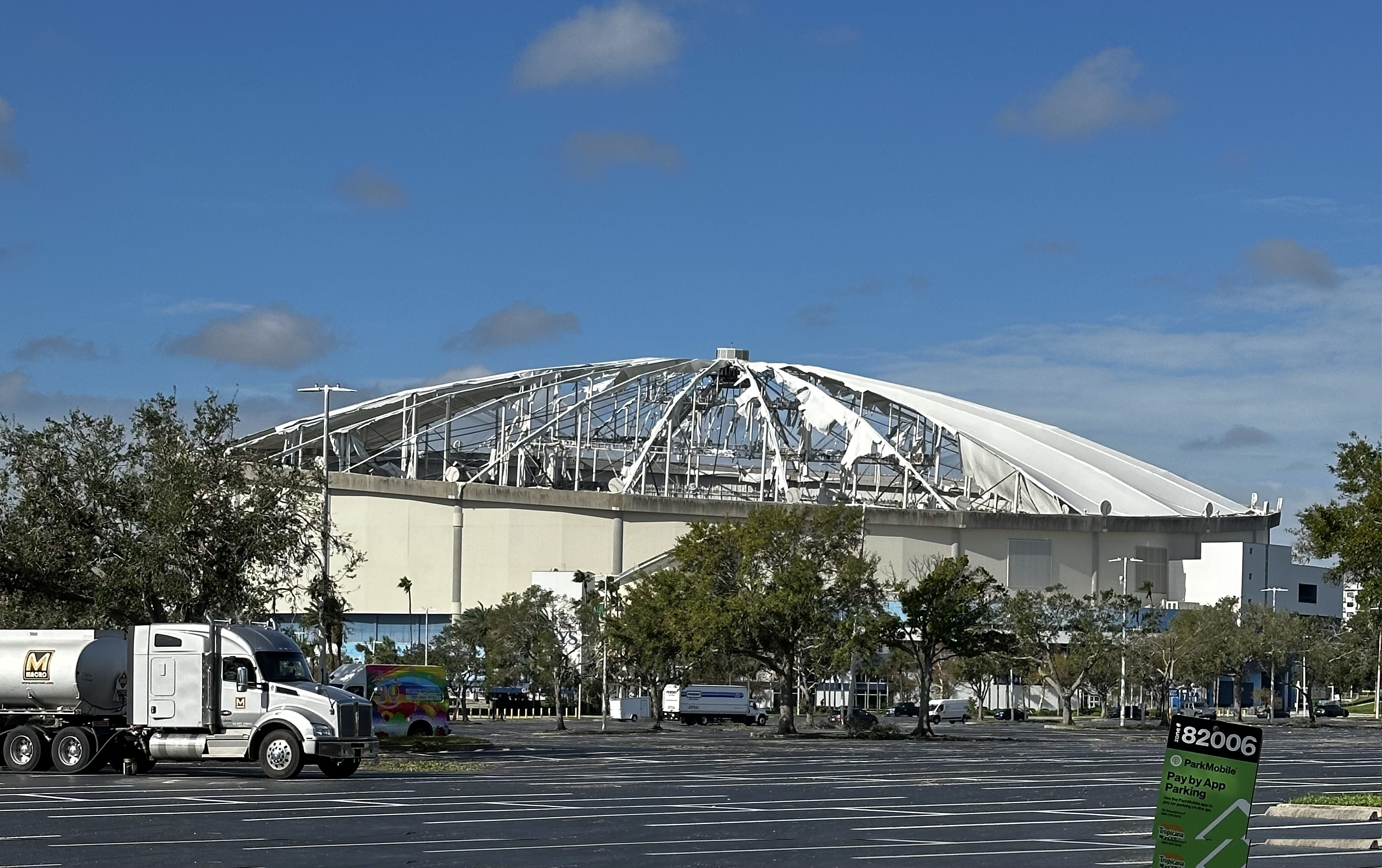
Damage to Tropicana Field's roof in St. Petersburg.

Tropicana Field, which had been set up to house first responders, lost a large part of its fiberglass roof as a result of wind gusts. As a result, the Tampa Bay Rays were forced to play their games for the 2025 Major League Baseball season at Steinbrenner Field. The Tampa Bay Times building in downtown St. Petersburg was severely damaged when a construction crane from a nearby partially built skyscraper collapsed into it. There were no reported injuries. Sarasota-Bradenton International Airport lost the entire roof of Concourse B, which housed the airport's Transportation Security Administration (TSA) screening checkpoint and all 13 aircraft loading gate hold rooms. Multiple areas across the state experienced significant flooding including parts of Orlando, Saint Johns, and throughout Hillsborough County. Rescuers saved 565 people from a Clearwater apartment complex where flooding was neck-deep in some places. Across the state, about 125 homes were destroyed before Milton made landfall, and more than 3 million homes and buildings were left without power. Hillsborough County saw the most power outages, with around 500,000 customers losing power. Nearly 1,000 people and 105 animals were rescued as of October 10. A sinkhole opened up in Hillsborough County as a result of Milton. US 17/92 collapsed with a sinkhole in Orange City, as well. Another sink hole opened up in Polk County which swallowed a pick up truck.

Damage in Volusia County reached $267 million. In Collier County, damage reached $280 million. Key West saw a large decline in commercial activity as a result of Milton and the closure of the Port of Key West.

Due to the combined impacts of Helene and Milton upon Al Lang Stadium in St. Petersburg, the USL Championship team Tampa Bay Rowdies were forced to play their final two home games at IMG Academy's Soccer Complex in Bradenton.

==== Tornado outbreak ====
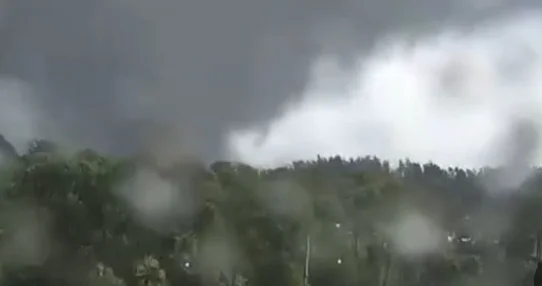
An EF3 tornado in Fort Pierce

At least 46 confirmed tornadoes touched down in Florida ahead of the storm, during a prolific tornado outbreak that occurred between October 8–9, focused on the Florida Heartland, the Treasure Coast and the Space Coast. This became the largest single day of tornadoes in state history, surpassing Hurricane Irma. At 6 pm, the National Weather Service office in Miami, which covers much of South Florida except the Florida Keys of Monroe County, reported that they had issued 55 tornado warnings, a record high in one day beating out the previous record of 37 on September 27, 2022, during Hurricane Ian, and confirmed nine tornadoes on a preliminary basis. The NWS in Tampa Bay also set a record high of 29 tornado warnings in one day, beating the previous record of 23 held by both Tropical Storm Debby of 2012 and Tropical Storm Andrea on June 6, 2013. In total, a record 126 tornado warnings have been issued throughout the state, the second-most of any state in one day, only behind Alabama on April 27, 2011, at the height of the 2011 Super Outbreak. Milton was also the first tropical cyclone to generate an intense (E/F3 or stronger) tornado in Florida since Agnes in 1972 and the third on record since 1950, the first occurring in 1959. Milton also yielded Florida's fifth deadliest outbreak in 70 years, behind the 1998 Kissimmee tornado outbreak, which killed 42; the 2007 Groundhog Day tornado outbreak, which killed 21; the March 31, 1962, outbreak, which killed 17; and the Hurricane Agnes outbreak, which killed seven.

Following the tornadoes, the National Guard coordinated with local law enforcement and first responders to conduct rescue missions, provide immediate assistance, and clear debris from vital roads. Additionally, Local organizations, citizen groups, churches, and individual volunteers helped with tornado relief efforts, providing supplies, temporary housing, and emotional support. Among the coordinated efforts, WPTV-TV partnered with several local businesses in St. Lucie, Martin, and Palm Beach counties to fundraise for tornado victims. In total, the property damage from the tornado outbreak was estimated at $681.8 million.

==== Elsewhere ====
Wind gusts in Savannah, Georgia, peaked at 22 mph (35 km/h). In Tybee Island, impacts were less than expected; however, the beaches remained closed due to rip currents. In South Carolina, wind gusts reached 40 mph (64 km/h) in Hilton Head Airport and Charleston Harbor, but impacts were also less than anticipated.

=== The Bahamas ===
Bimini and West Grand Bahama experienced winds of around 15–20 miles per hour (24–32 km/h) and waves of two to four feet (0.61 to 1.22 m). Power and water outages occurred on a few islands. Localized flooding also occurred. Grand Bahama and Abaco experienced coastal floodings and strong gusts. Aarone Sargeant, the managing director of the Bahamas' Disaster Risk Management Authority, stated that there were no reports of injuries or significant damage, with only minor damage occurring in the country.

== Aftermath ==
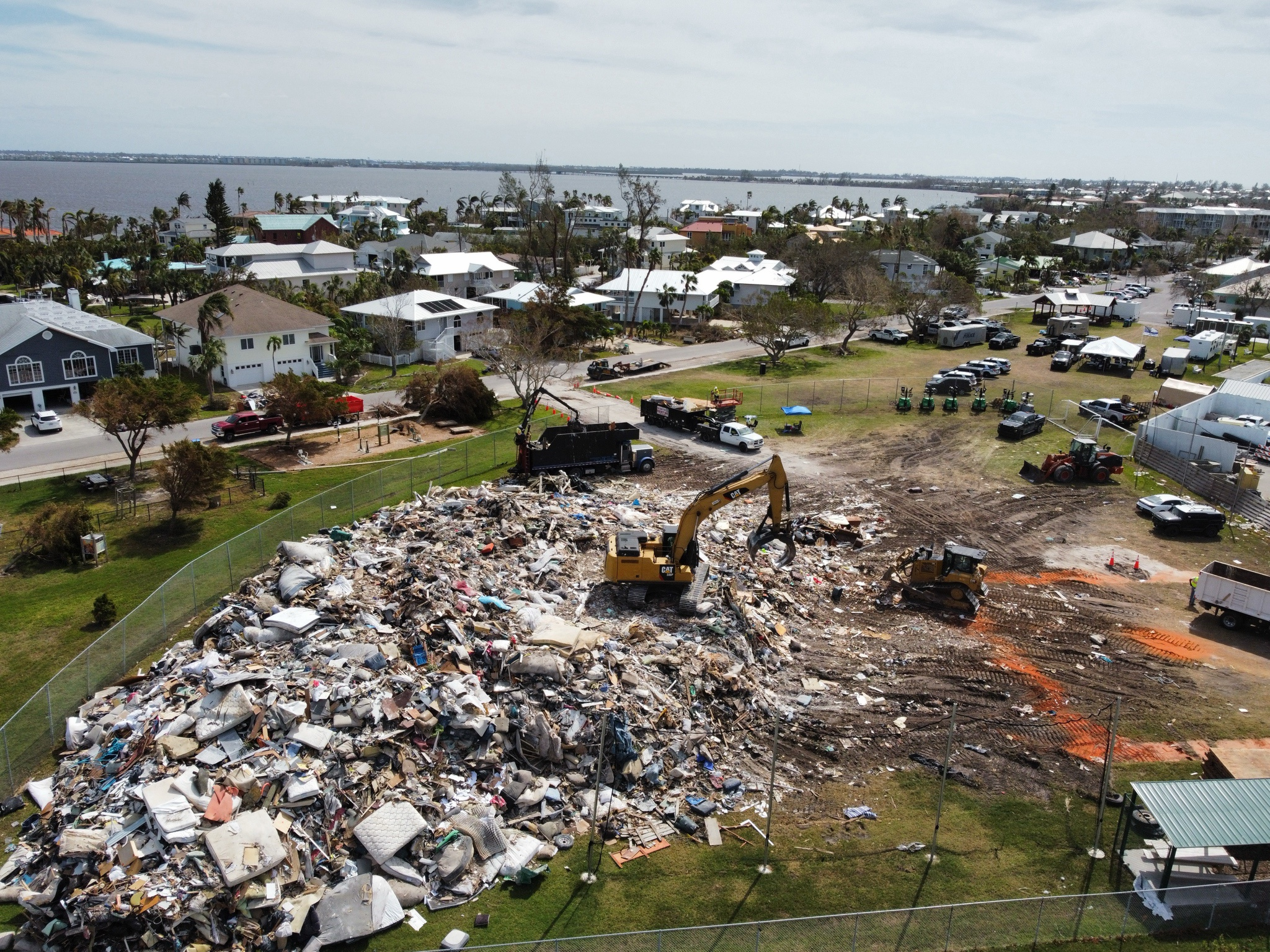
A debris staging area in Holmes Beach on October 19, 2024

Amtrak again modified their Silver Service routes between October 13 and 15 due to residual impacts after the storm. Most tolls in Florida were re-instated on October 14, although exceptions were made for Orlando and Tampa.

Following the storm, many businesses and private citizens donated to relief efforts. Taylor Swift donated $5 million to help with combined relief from Milton and Hurricane Helene, with Walmart donating $16 million. On October 12, Joe Biden issued a disaster declaration for the state. By October 13, over 250,000 Floridians registered for help, which was the most in a day in national history. There has also been mention that other celebrities have made contributions, such as Dolly Parton, Morgan Wallen, Blake Lively, Tom Brady and Metallica. The Baltimore Orioles also donated at least $250,000 to Hurricane Milton relief efforts.

Widespread fuel shortages occurred at gas stations after the storm. Governor Ron DeSantis opened up three fuel sites where residents could get ten gallons of fuel as a result. Much of Cumberland Island National Seashore re-opened on October 12, although several trails in the northern segments of the park remained closed for damage assessments. Canaveral National Seashore was also closed following the storm, with re-opening beginning on October 19.

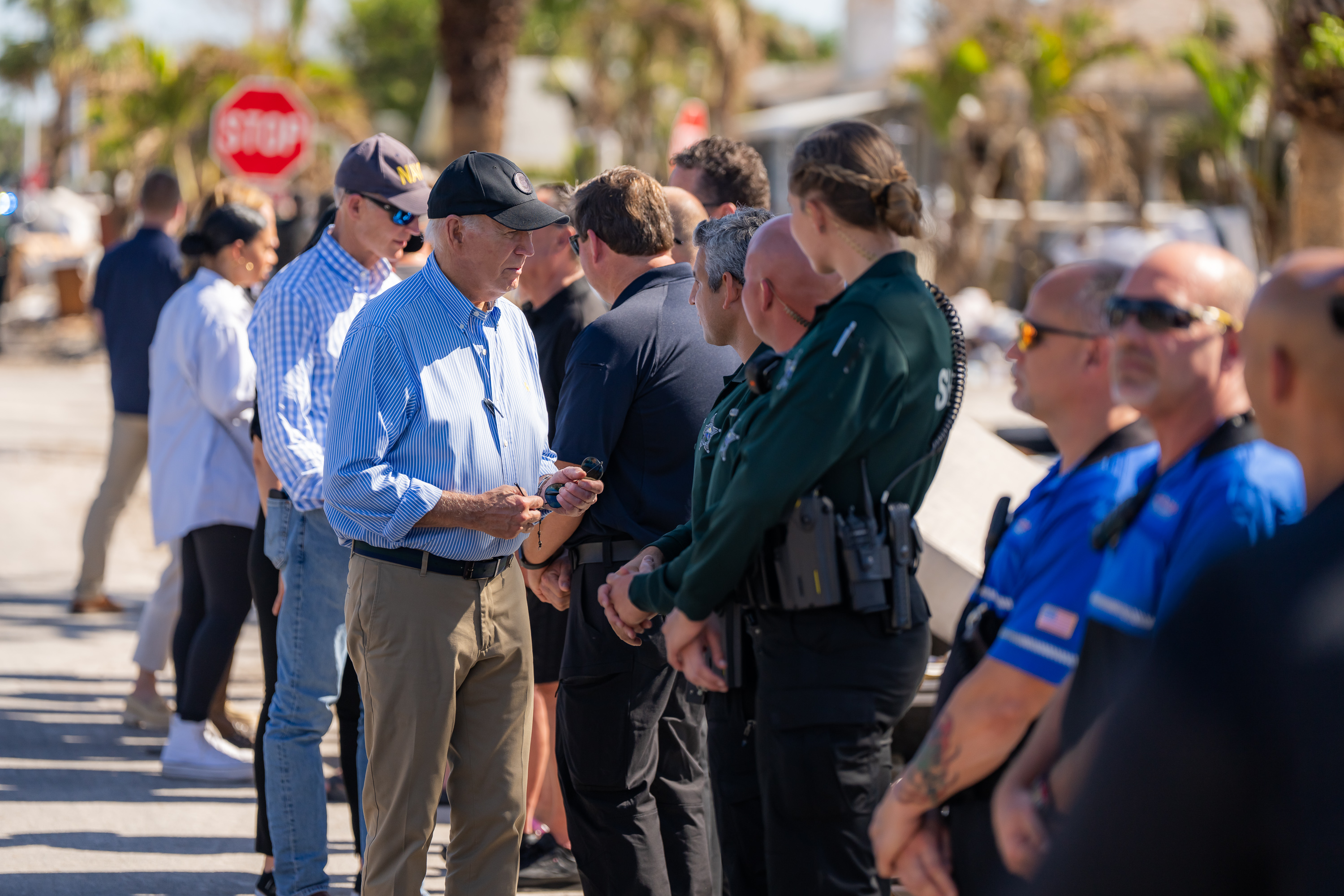
President Joe Biden greets first responders in St. Pete Beach on October 13, 2024

On October 13, Joe Biden flew to MacDill Air Force Base aboard Air Force One where he then boarded Marine One and embarked on an aerial tour of St. Petersburg before landing at Albert Whitted Airport. Biden met with state and local officials such as Senator Rick Scott, Representative Anna Paulina Luna, and Pinellas County Sheriff Bob Gualtieri. Biden then departed the airport in a motorcade and traveled to St. Pete Beach where he met residents and first responders before giving a speech about the recovery efforts. During the speech, Biden announced $612 million for six Department of Energy projects to improve the resilience of electric grids in areas affected by hurricanes, which included $94 million for two projects in Florida.

The Florida Supervisors of Elections (FSOE), in an October 15 letter addressed to Florida Secretary of State Cord Byrd and Division of Elections Director Maria Matthews, requested a lessening of election and voting restrictions in Collier, Glades, Highlands, Indian River, Manatee, Orange, Pinellas, Polk, Sarasota, and St. Lucie counties. Among the requests included extensions to early voting and to the deadlines for mail-in ballot delivery, notification of the location of mail-in ballot drop boxes, and the appointment of poll workers. FSOE also asked if requirements could be waived for the relocation of polling places and to authorize "immediate family members of first responders, line workers and relief workers to request mail-in ballots on their behalf", according to Florida Politics.

Florida saw a rise in cases of Vibrio vulnificus, a flesh-eating bacteria that favors warm waters and spreads in heavy flood rains, following Hurricane Milton, with cleanup efforts from Hurricane Helene happening concurrently. There were 38 confirmed cases in October after Milton. Milton and Helene left behind standing water, causing an outbreak in dengue fever.

As happened following Hurricane Helene, misinformation and conspiracy theories regarding Milton and the post-storm government response began spreading over social media.

Florida Highway Patrol (FHP) rescued an abandoned Bull Terrier restrained to a post in belly-deep water on Interstate 75 near Bruce B. Downs Boulevard in Tampa, hours before Milton made landfall. In response, Florida Governor Ron DeSantis signed Trooper's Law, named after the dog, in May 2025, making the act a third-degree felony punishable with five years in prison and a $10,000 fine.

FEMA came under criticism in early November, when a whistleblower's report revealed that FEMA supervisor Marn'i Washington instructed team members that it was "best practice" to skip Trump-supporting homes as they canvassed Florida neighborhoods, determining who needed assistance following the hurricane. FEMA workers skipped at least 20 homes in Lake Placid with Trump signs or flags. FEMA responded by stating it was "deeply disturbed by this employee's actions" and claimed that the agency works to "help all survivors regardless of their political preference or affiliation." Washington was fired for her actions. Following a state investigation of the matter, Florida Attorney General Ashley Moody filed a discrimination lawsuit on November 14 against FEMA for conspiring to violate the civil rights of Florida residents in the response to Hurricanes Helene and Milton. Subsequently, between November 2024 and March 2025, the United States Congress held four separate televised investigative hearings on the federal government's response to, overall recovery efforts from, and criminal events by FEMA employees following Helene and Milton a few weeks later.

After Hurricanes Helene and Milton impacted Florida, there was an increase in depression and anxiety symptoms along with cigarette usage among adults with chronic diseases.

=== Retirement ===
Owing to the widespread destruction it caused in Florida, the name Milton was retired by the World Meteorological Organization during the 47th Session of the RA IV Hurricane Committee on April 2, 2025, and will never be used again for an Atlantic hurricane. It was replaced by Miguel in the list, which is scheduled to be used during the 2030 season.

== See also ==
- Weather of 2024
- Tropical cyclones in 2024
- Timeline of the 2024 Atlantic hurricane season
- List of Florida hurricanes (2000–present)

== Sources ==
- National Weather Service (June 1972). Storm Data Publication (Report). National Centers for Environmental Information – via Storm Events Database.
