= Signature Place =

36-story skyscraper located on 1st Street South in downtown St. Petersburg, Florida

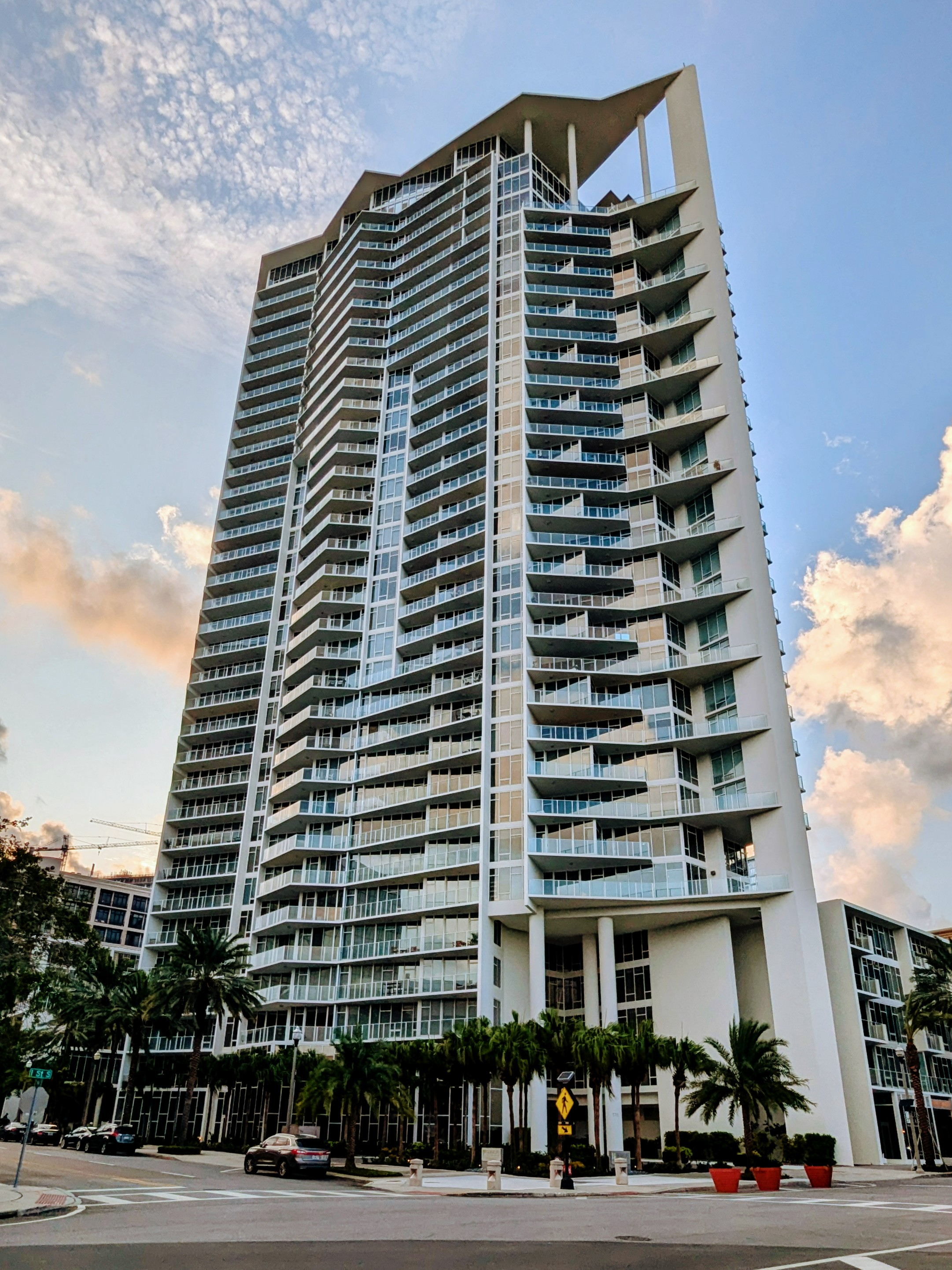
- Street level view, 2024
- Interactive map of the Signature Place area
- Alternative names: The Peninsula; SkyPlace

General information
- Status: Completed
- Type: Residential Condominium
- Location: 100 1st Avenue South, St. Petersburg, Florida, United States
- Coordinates: 27.7708°N 82.63365°W
- Completed: 2009
- Cost: US$167 million

Height
- Roof: 116.1 m (381 ft)

Technical details
- Floor count: 36
- Floor area: 714,993 sq ft (66,425.0 m^{2})
- Lifts/elevators: 5

Design and construction
- Architect: Perkins + Will
- Developer: Joel Cantor
- Main contractor: Lendlease (US) Construction Inc.

Signature Place is a 36-story skyscraper located on 1st Street South in downtown St. Petersburg, Florida. Construction started in December 2007 and finished in 2009. At 116.1 m (381 ft.), Signature Place is the third tallest skyscraper and the second tallest residential skyscraper in St. Petersburg. The residential skyscraper contains 243 residential units.

== See also ==
- List of tallest buildings in St. Petersburg
