= Spanish Americans =

Americans of Spanish birth or descent

Hispano-estadounidenses (Spanish)
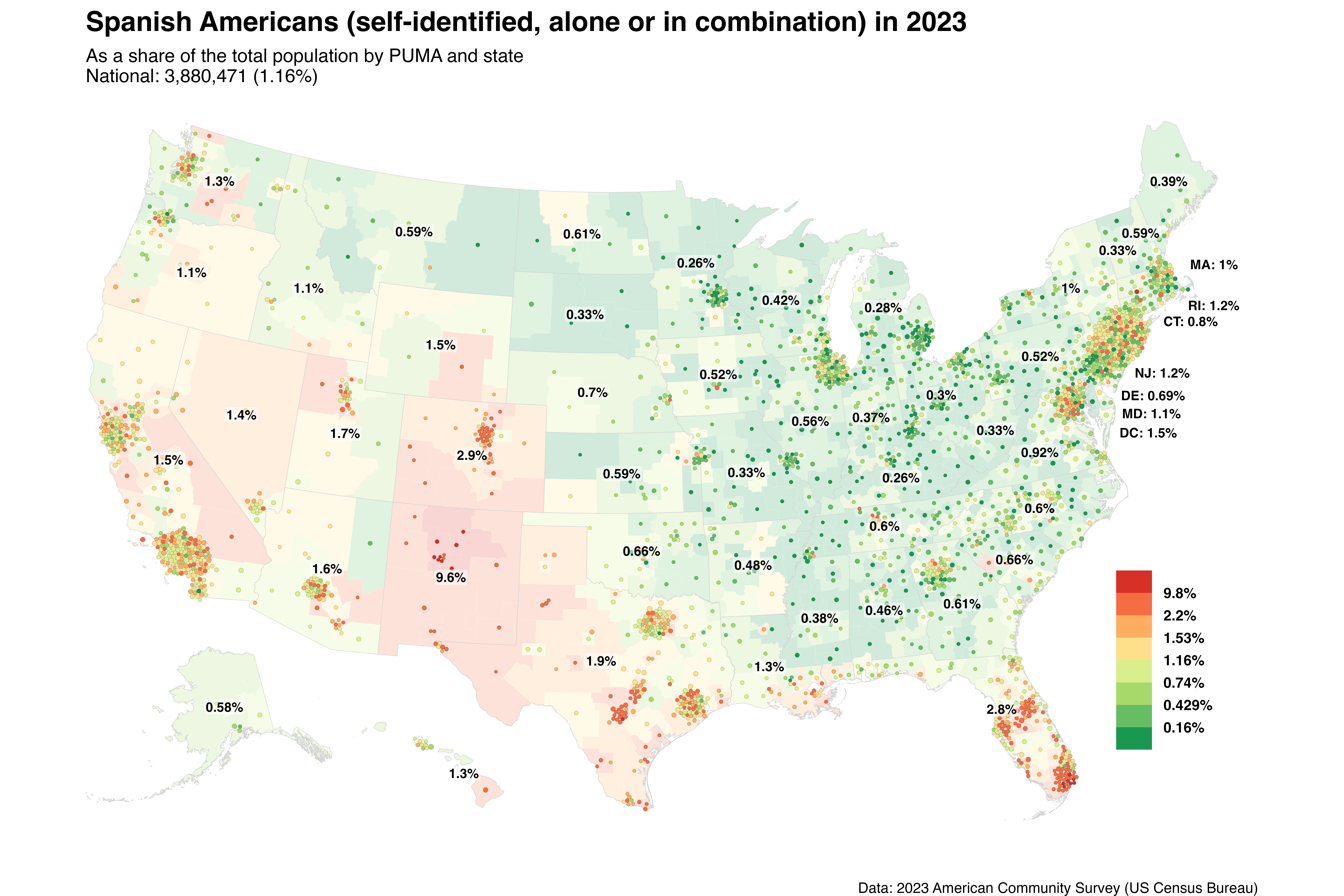

Total population
- Self-identified as "Spaniard"; 978,978 (2020); Self-identified as "Spanish American"; 50,966 (2020); Self-identified as "Spanish"; 866,356 (2020)

Regions with significant populations
- California; Louisiana; Texas; New Mexico; Colorado; Florida; New York; Montana; Arizona; Nevada; Idaho; Washington

Languages
- English; Spanish; Spanglish; Languages of Spain (Catalan, Galician, Basque, Occitan, Aragonese and Asturian)

Religion
- Christianity (Predominantly Roman Catholicism, minority Protestantism); non-religious

Related ethnic groups
- Spaniards; Hispanic and Latino Americans; Portuguese Americans; Hispanos; Isleño; other European Americans

Spanish Americans (Spanish: españoles estadounidenses, hispanoestadounidenses, or hispanonorteamericanos) are Americans whose ancestry originates wholly or partly from Spain. They are the longest-established European American group in the modern United States, with a very small group descending from those explorations leaving from Spain and the Viceroyalty of New Spain (modern Mexico), and starting in the early 1500s, of 42 of the future U.S. states from California to Florida; and beginning a continuous presence in Florida since 1565 and New Mexico since 1598. In the 2020 United States census, 978,978 self-identified as "Spaniard" representing (0.4%) of the white alone or in combination population who responded to the question. Other results include 866,356 (0.4%) identifying as "Spanish" and 50,966 who identified with "Spanish American".

Many Hispanic and Latino Americans (the Hispanos of New Mexico being the oldest group) living in the United States have some Spanish ancestral roots due to up to four centuries of Spanish colonial settlement and significant immigration of Spaniards after independence. In terms of ancestry, these groups, and especially white Hispanic and Latino Americans 12,579,626 (white alone, 20.3% of all Hispanics) could be called "Spanish Americans", with the caveat that they can also include European origins other than Spanish, and often Amerindian or African ancestry. A number of communities descended from European Spanish immigrants are elided by the “Hispanic and Latino” ethnic category; these include the descendants of Basques in the western states, Isleños in the gulf coast states, and Asturians in states like West Virginia, among others.

The term "Spanish American" is used mostly to refer to Americans whose self-identified ancestry originates directly from Spain in the 19th and 20th centuries.

== History ==
Juan Ponce de León was the first Spaniard to explore what is now the United States. He explored the area of Florida. The first Native American tribe he encountered were the Calusa. The Spanish enslaved Native Americans and drastically reduced their population by transmitting diseases like smallpox, measles, whooping cough, and influenza.

== Immigration waves ==
Throughout the colonial times, there were a number of European settlements of Spanish populations in the present-day United States of America with governments answerable to Madrid. The first settlement on modern-day U.S. soil was San Juan, Puerto Rico, in 1521, followed by St. Augustine, Florida (the oldest in the continental United States), in 1565, followed by others in New Mexico, California, Arizona, and Texas. In 1598, San Juan de los Caballeros was established, near present-day Santa Fe, New Mexico, by Juan de Oñate and about 1,000 other Spaniards from the Viceroyalty of New Spain.

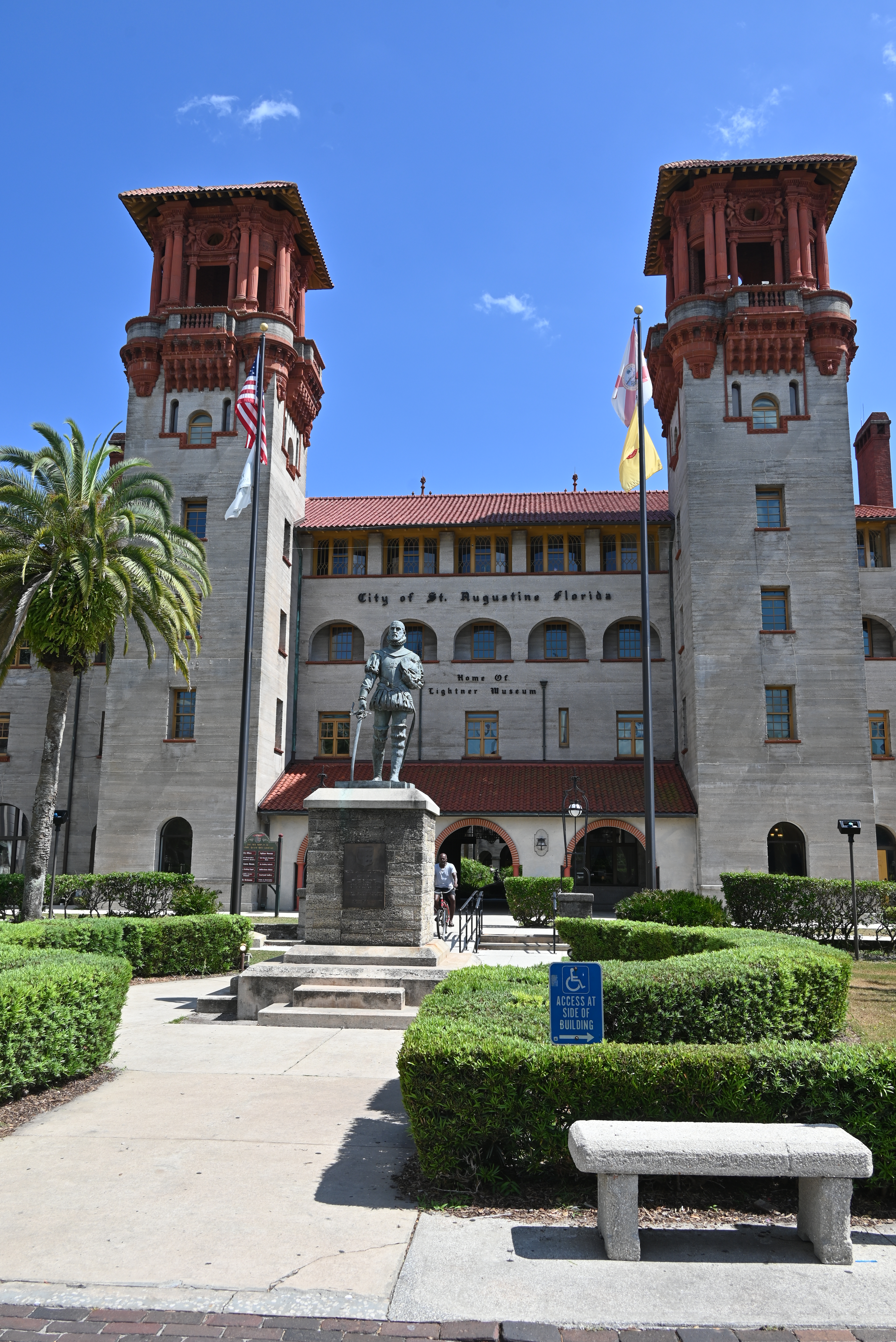
Statue of Pedro Menéndez de Avilés, the founder of St. Augustine, Florida.

Spanish immigrants also established settlements in San Diego, California (1602), San Antonio, Texas (1691) and Tucson, Arizona (1699). By the mid-1600s the Spanish in America numbered more than 400,000.

After the establishment of the American colonies, an additional 250,000 immigrants arrived either directly from Spain, the Canary Islands or, after a relatively short sojourn, from present-day central Mexico. These Spanish settlers expanded European influence in the New World. The Canary Islanders settled in bayou areas surrounding New Orleans in Louisiana from 1778 to 1783 and in San Antonio de Bejar, San Antonio, Texas, in 1731.

The earliest known Spanish settlements in the then northern Mexico were the result of the same forces that later led the English to come to North America. Exploration had been fueled in part by imperial hopes for the discovery of wealthy civilizations. In addition, like those aboard the Mayflower, most Spaniards came to the New World seeking land to farm, or occasionally, as historians have recently established, freedom from religious persecution. A smaller percentage of new Spanish settlers were descendants of Spanish Jewish converts and Spanish Muslim converts.

Basques stood out in the exploration of the Americas, both as soldiers and members of the crews that sailed for the Spanish. Another reason for their emigration besides the restrictive inheritance laws in the Basque Country, was the devastation from the Napoleonic Wars in the first half of the nineteenth century, which was followed by defeats in the two Carlist civil wars. (For more information about the Basque, and immigrants to the United States from this region, see Basque Americans.)

=== 19th and 20th centuries ===
Spanish immigration to the U.S. 1820–2000
Period	Arrivals	Period	Arrivals	Period	Arrivals
1820–1830	2,616	1891–1900	8,731	1961–1970	44,659
1831–1840	2,125	1901–1910	27,935	1971–1980	39,141
1841–1850	2,209	1911–1920	68,611	1981–1990	20,433
1851–1860	9,298	1921–1930	28,958	1991–2000	17,157
1861–1870	6,697	1931–1940	3,258	2001–2010	-
1871–1880	5,266	1941–1950	2,898	2011-2020	-
1881–1890	4,419	1951–1960	7,894	-	-
Total arrivals: 302,305

Immigration to the United States from Spain was controversially minimal but steady during the first half of the nineteenth century, with an increase during the 1850s and 1860s resulting from the bloody warfare of the Carlist civil wars during the years of 1833–1876. Much larger numbers of Spanish immigrants entered the country in the first quarter of the twentieth century—27,000 in the first decade and 68,000 in the second—due to the same circumstances of rural poverty and urban congestion that led other Europeans to emigrate in that period, as well as unpopular wars-in this first wave of Spanish immigration. The Spanish presence in the United States declined sharply between 1930 and 1940 from a total of 110,000 to 85,000, because many immigrants returned to Spain after finishing their farmwork.

Beginning with the coup d'état against the Second Spanish Republic in 1936 and the devastating civil war that ensued, General Francisco Franco established a dictatorship for 37 years. At the time of his takeover, a small but prominent group of liberal intellectuals fled to the United States. After the civil war the country endured a period of autarky, as Franco believed that post-World War II Spain could survive or continue its activities without any European assistance.

== Main areas of settlement ==
Historical population
Year	Pop.	±%
1850	3,113	—
1860	4,244	+36.3%
1870	3,764	−11.3%
1880	5,121	+36.1%
1890	6,185	+20.8%
1900	7,050	+14.0%
1910	22,108	+213.6%
1920	49,535	+124.1%
1950	59,362	+19.8%
1960	44,999	−24.2%
1970	57,488	+27.8%
1980	73,735	+28.3%
1990	76,415	+3.6%
2000	82,858	+8.4%
2010	83,242	+0.5%
2020	118,177	+42.0%
Source: Spanish-born

Spanish Americans in the United States are found in large concentrations in five major states from 1940 through the early twenty-first century. In 1940, the highest concentration of Spaniards were in New York (primarily New York City), followed by California, Florida, New Jersey and Pennsylvania. The 1950 U.S. census indicated little change—New York with 14,705 residents from Spain and California with 10,890 topped the list. Spaniards followed into New Jersey with 3,382, followed by Florida (3,382) and Pennsylvania (1,790). By 1990 and 2000, there was relatively little change except in the order of the states and the addition of Texas. In 1990, Florida ranked first with 78,656 Spanish immigrants followed by: California 74,784, New York (42,309), Texas (32,226), New Jersey (28,666). The 2000 U.S. census saw a significant decline in Spanish-origin immigrants. California now ranked highest (22,459), followed by, Florida (14,110 arriving from Spain), New York (13,017), New Jersey (9,183), Texas (7,202).

Communities in the United States, in keeping with their strong regional identification in Spain, have established ethnic organizations for Basques, Galicians, Asturians, Andalusians, and other such communities.

The Gitanos (Gypsies) are predominantly located in the major metropolitan areas situated along both the East Coast and West Coast regions of the United States.

These figures show that there was never the mass emigration from Iberia that there was from Latin America. It is evident in the figures that Spanish immigration peaked in the 1910s and 1920s. The majority settled in Florida and New York, although there was also a sizable Spanish influx to West Virginia at the turn of the 20th century, mostly from Asturias. These Asturian immigrants worked in the U.S. zinc industry after having worked in the smelters of Real Compañía Asturiana de Minas in Arnao, on the north coast near Avilés.

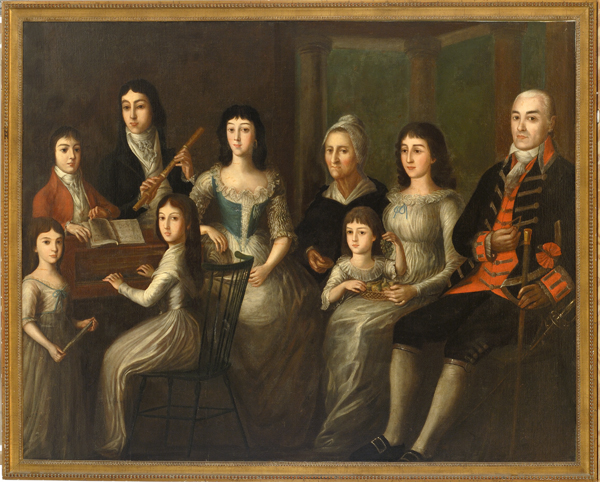
Spanish Creole family portrait in New Orleans, Spanish Louisiana, 1790, painted by José Francisco de Salazar.

It is likely that more Spaniards settled in Latin America than in the United States, due to common language, shared religion, and cultural ties.

=== California ===
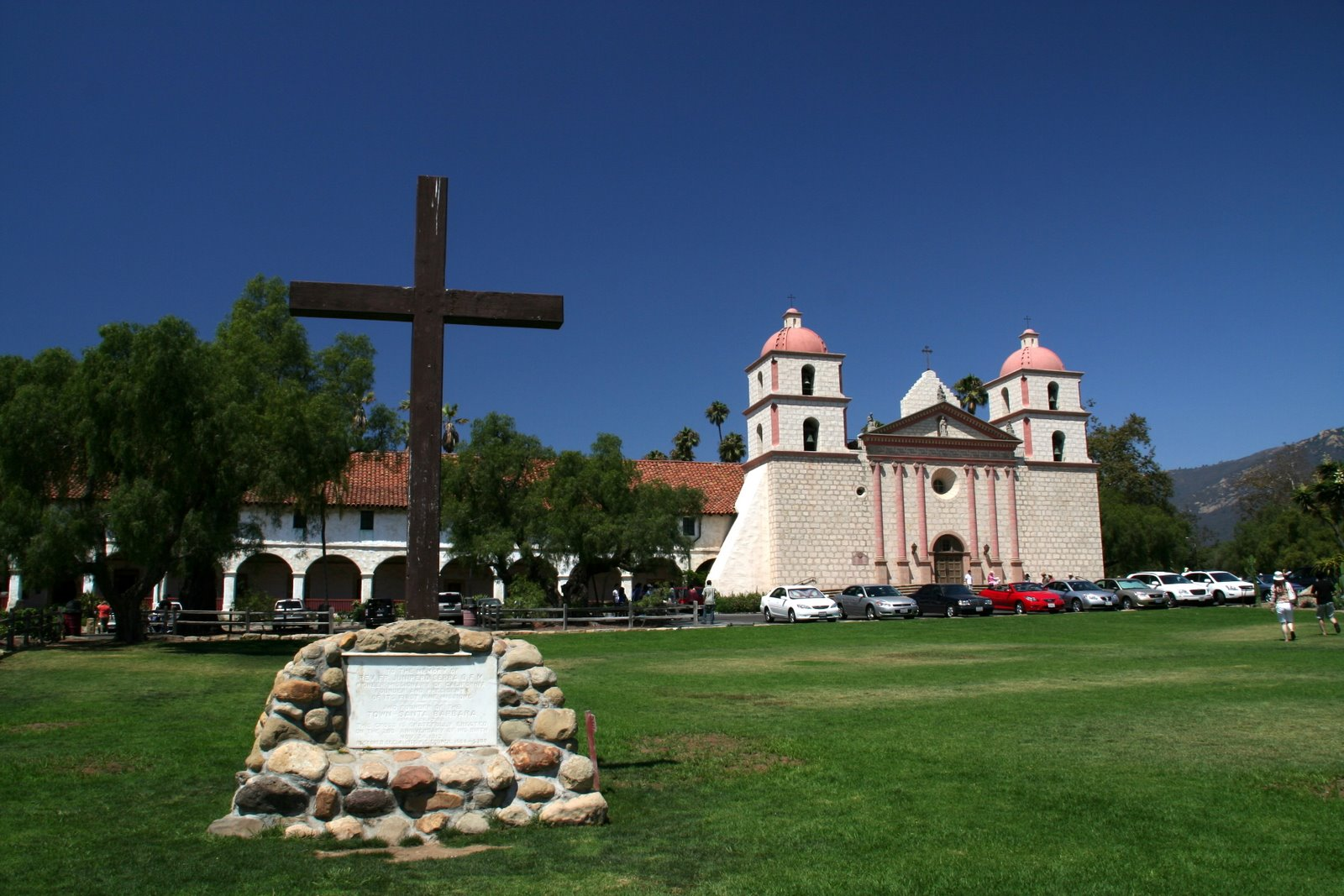
Spanish Mission Santa Barbara in California, founded in 1786.

A Californio is a Spanish term for a descendant of a person of Spanish and Mexican ancestry who was born in Alta California. "Alta California" refers to the time of the first Spanish presence established by the Portolá expedition in 1769 until the region's cession to the United States of America in 1848.

Since 1945, others sometimes referred to as Californios (many appear in the "Notable Californios" section below) include: Early Alta California immigrants who settled down and made new lives in the province, regardless of where they were born. This group is distinct from indigenous peoples of California. Descendants of Californios, especially those who married other Californios.

The military, religious and civil components of pre-1848 Californio society were embodied in the thinly-populated presidios, missions, pueblos and ranchos. Until they were secularized in the 1830s, the twenty-one Spanish missions of California, with their thousands of more-or-less captive native converts, controlled the most (about 1,000,000 acres (4,000 km^{2}) per mission) and best land, had large numbers of workers, grew the most crops and had the most sheep, cattle and horses. After secularization, the Mexican authorities divided most of the mission lands into new ranchos and granted them to Mexican citizens (already present Californios) resident in California.

The Spanish colonial and later Mexican national governments encouraged settlers from the northern and western provinces of Mexico, whom Californios called "Sonorans." Small groups of people from other parts of Latin America (most notably Peru and Chile) also settled in California. However, only a few official colonization efforts (from New Spain) were ever undertaken—notably the second expeditions of Gaspar de Portolá (1770) and of Juan Bautista de Anza (1775–1776). Children of those few early settlers and retired soldiers became the first Californios. One genealogist estimated that, in 2004, between 300,000 and 500,000 Californians were descendants of Californios.

=== Florida ===
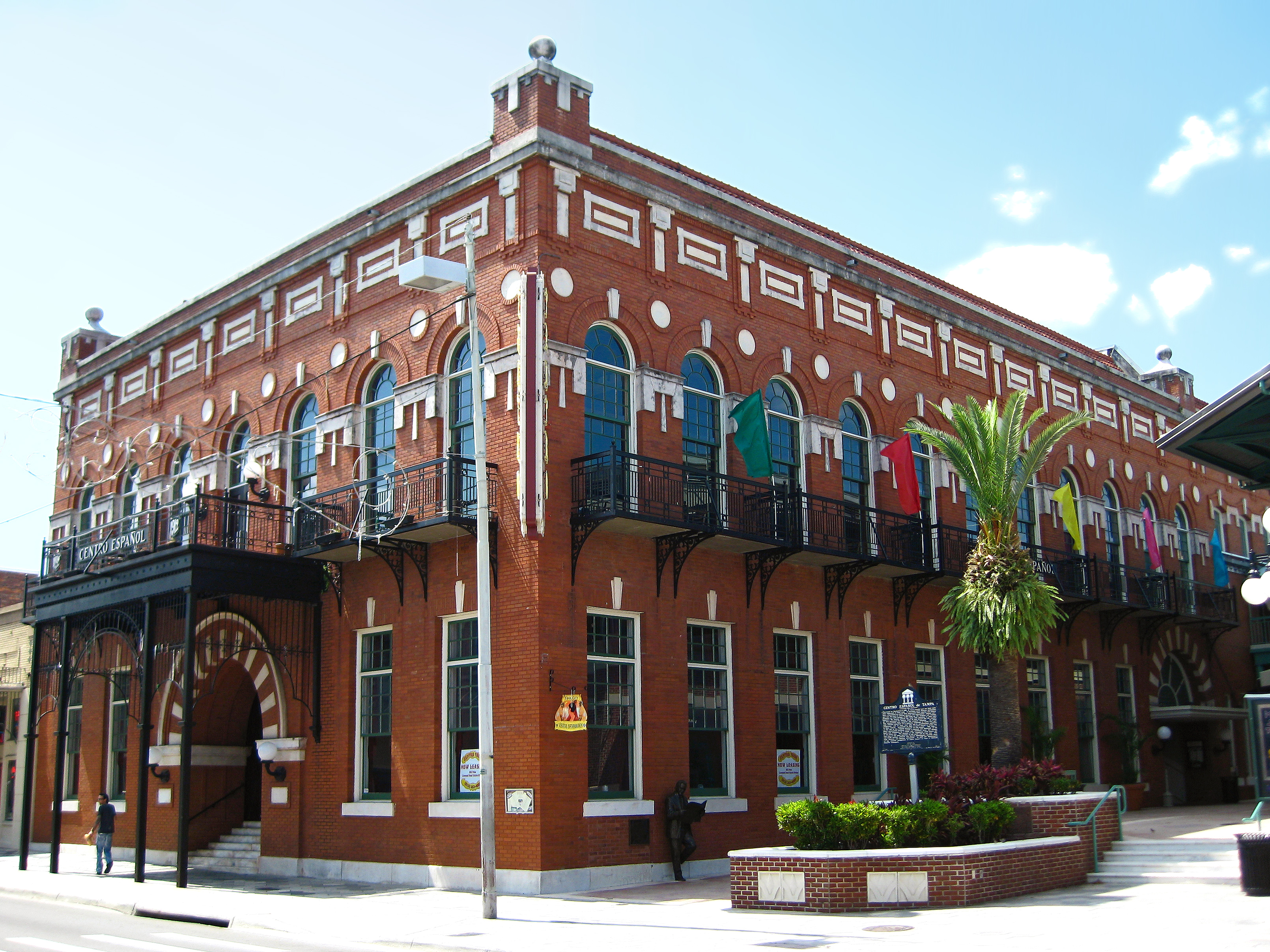
El Centro Español de Tampa is a cultural house built in 1912 in the Ybor City neighborhood of Tampa, Florida.

Juan Ponce de León, a Spanish conquistador, named Florida in honor of his discovery of the land on April 2, 1513, during Pascua Florida, a Spanish term for the Easter season. Pedro Menéndez de Avilés founded the city of St. Augustine in 1565; the first European-founded city in what is now the continental United States.

The El Centro Español de Tampa remains one of the few surviving structures specific to Spanish immigration to the United States during the late 19th and early 20th centuries, a legacy that garnered the Centro Español building recognition as a U.S. National Historic Landmark (NHL) on June 3, 1988.

Spanish immigrants established important mutual-aid societies such as El Centro Español (1891) and the Centro Asturiano. These institutions provided healthcare, education, cultural activities, and social support for newly arrived immigrants and their descendants

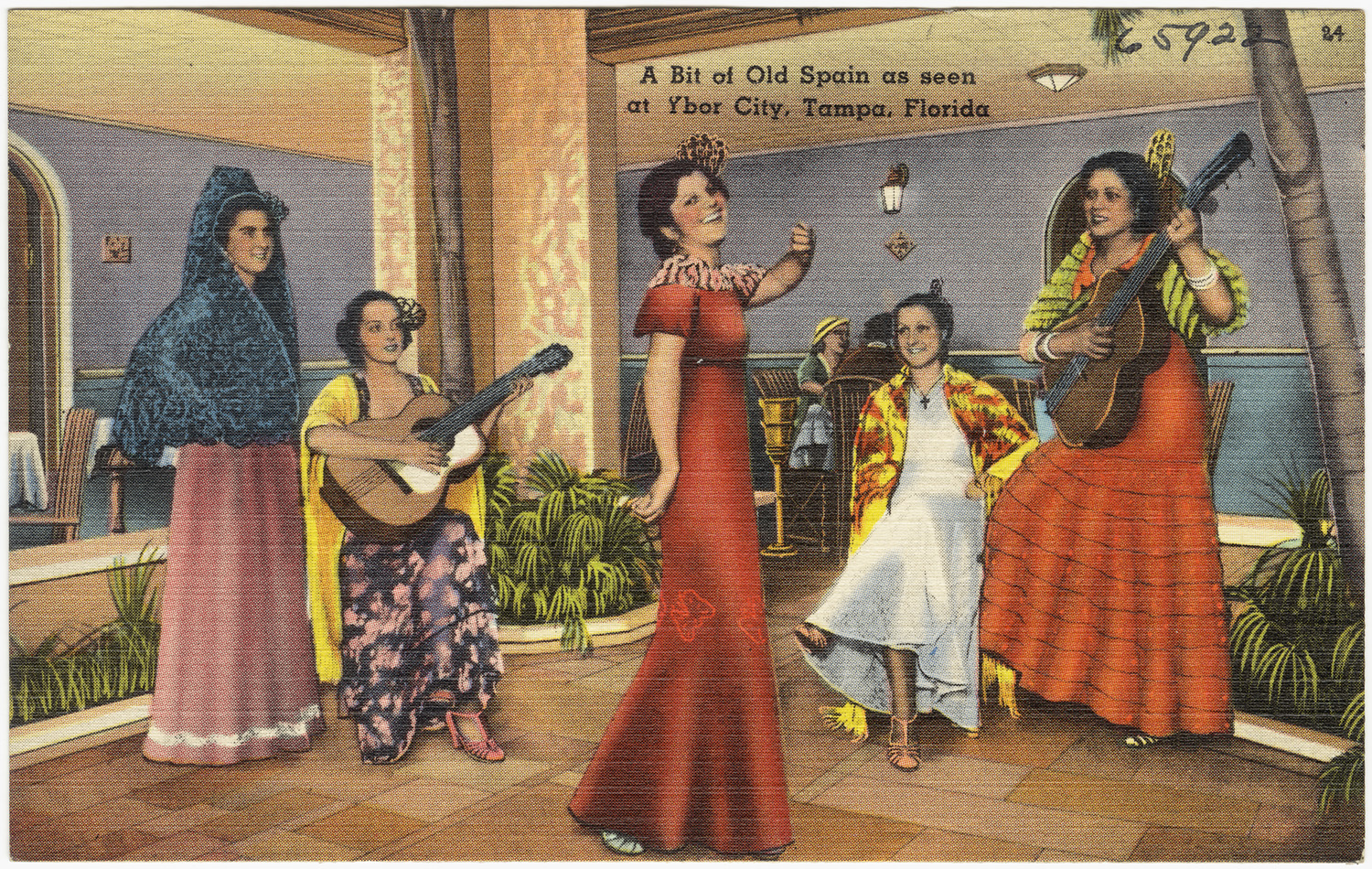
Postcard for Ybor City, often referred to as a "bit of old Spain". Although it is restricted to the Andalusian region of Spain.

In the early 1880s, Tampa was an isolated village with a population of less than 1000 and a struggling economy. However, its combination of a good port, Henry Plant's new railroad line, and humid climate attracted the attention of Vicente Martinez Ybor, a prominent Spanish-born cigar manufacturer; the neighborhood of Ybor City was named after him.

During the late nineteenth and early twentieth centuries, Tampa became one of the principal destinations for Spanish immigrants in the United States. Drawn by employment opportunities in the cigar industry, thousands of Spaniards, particularly from the regions of Asturias and Galicia in Northern Spain, settled in Ybor City and West Tampa.

Vicki Lopez is a politician from Florida of Asturian descent.

The development of Ybor City after 1885 attracted large numbers of Spanish cigar workers and their families, helping transform Tampa into a major cigar-manufacturing center and one of the largest Spanish immigrant communities in the United States.

Together with Cuban and Italian immigrants, Spaniards played a major role in shaping Florida's multicultural identity. Their legacy remains visible in the historic architecture, cultural institutions, and community traditions.

=== Hawaii ===
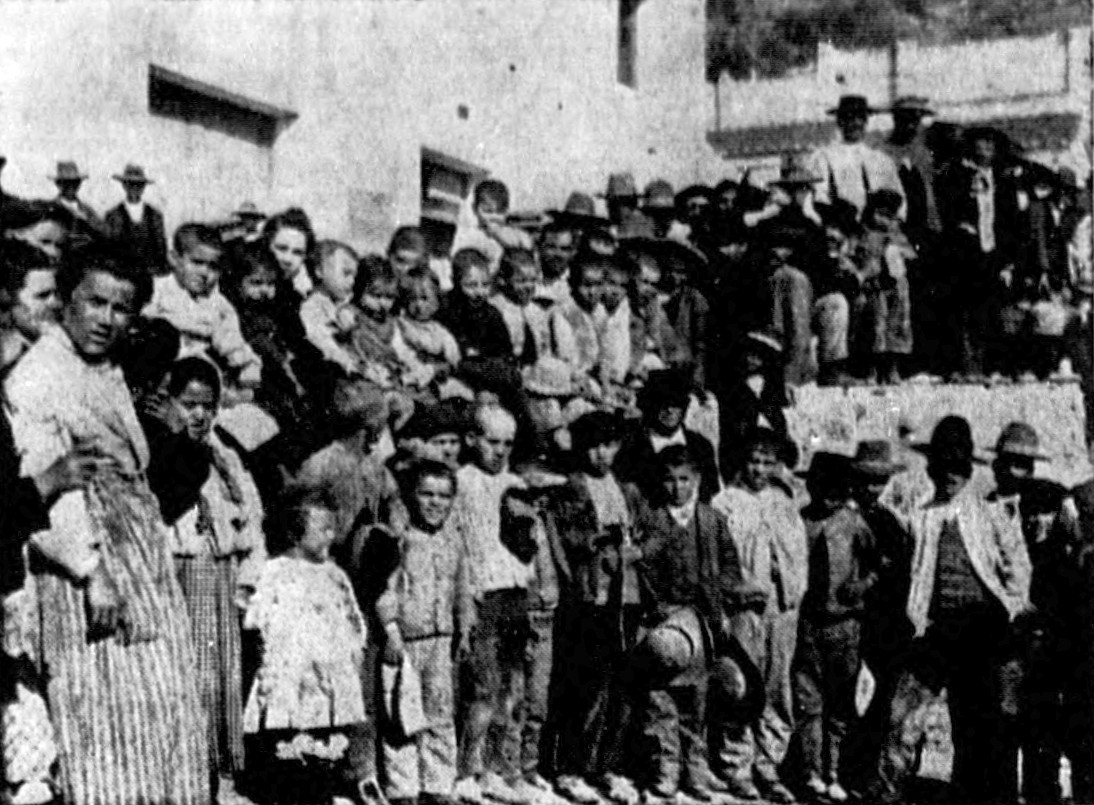
Spanish children from the SS Heliopolis after arriving in Hawaii in 1907

Spanish immigration to Hawaii began when the Hawaiian government and the Hawaiian Sugar Planters' Association (HSPA) decided to supplement their ongoing importation of Portuguese workers to Hawaii with workers recruited from Spain. Importation of Spanish laborers, along with their families, continued until 1913, at which time more than 9,000 Spanish immigrants had been brought in, most recruited to work primarily on the Hawaiian sugar plantations.

The importation of Spanish laborers to Hawaii began in 1907, when the British steamship SS Heliopolis arrived in Honolulu Harbor with 2,246 immigrants from the Málaga province of Spain. However, rumored poor accommodations and food on the voyage created political complications that delayed the next Spanish importation until 1911, when the SS Orteric arrived with a mixed contingent of 960 Spanish and 565 Portuguese immigrants, the Spanish having boarded at Gibraltar, and the Portuguese at Porto and Lisbon. Although Portuguese immigration to Hawaii effectively ended after the arrival of the Orteric, the importation of Spanish laborers and their families continued until 1913, ultimately bringing to Hawaii a total of 9,262 Spanish immigrants.

Six ships between 1907 and 1913 brought over 9,000 Spanish immigrants from the Spanish mainland to Hawaii. Although many of the Portuguese immigrants who preceded them to Hawaii arrived on small wooden sailing ships of less than a thousand gross tonnage capacity, all of the ships involved in the Spanish immigration were large, steel-hulled, passenger steamships.

=== Louisiana ===
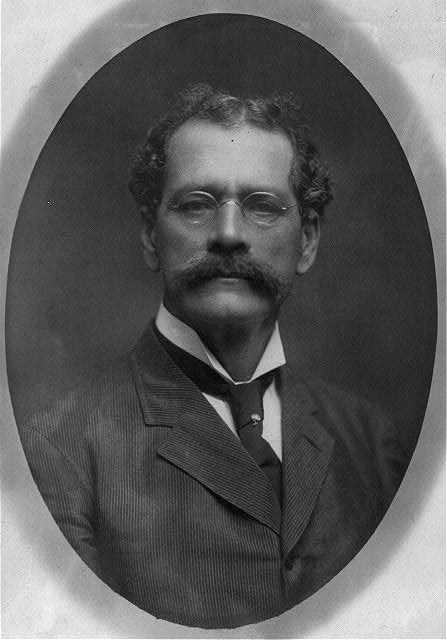
Albert Estopinal, Lieutenant Governor of Louisiana

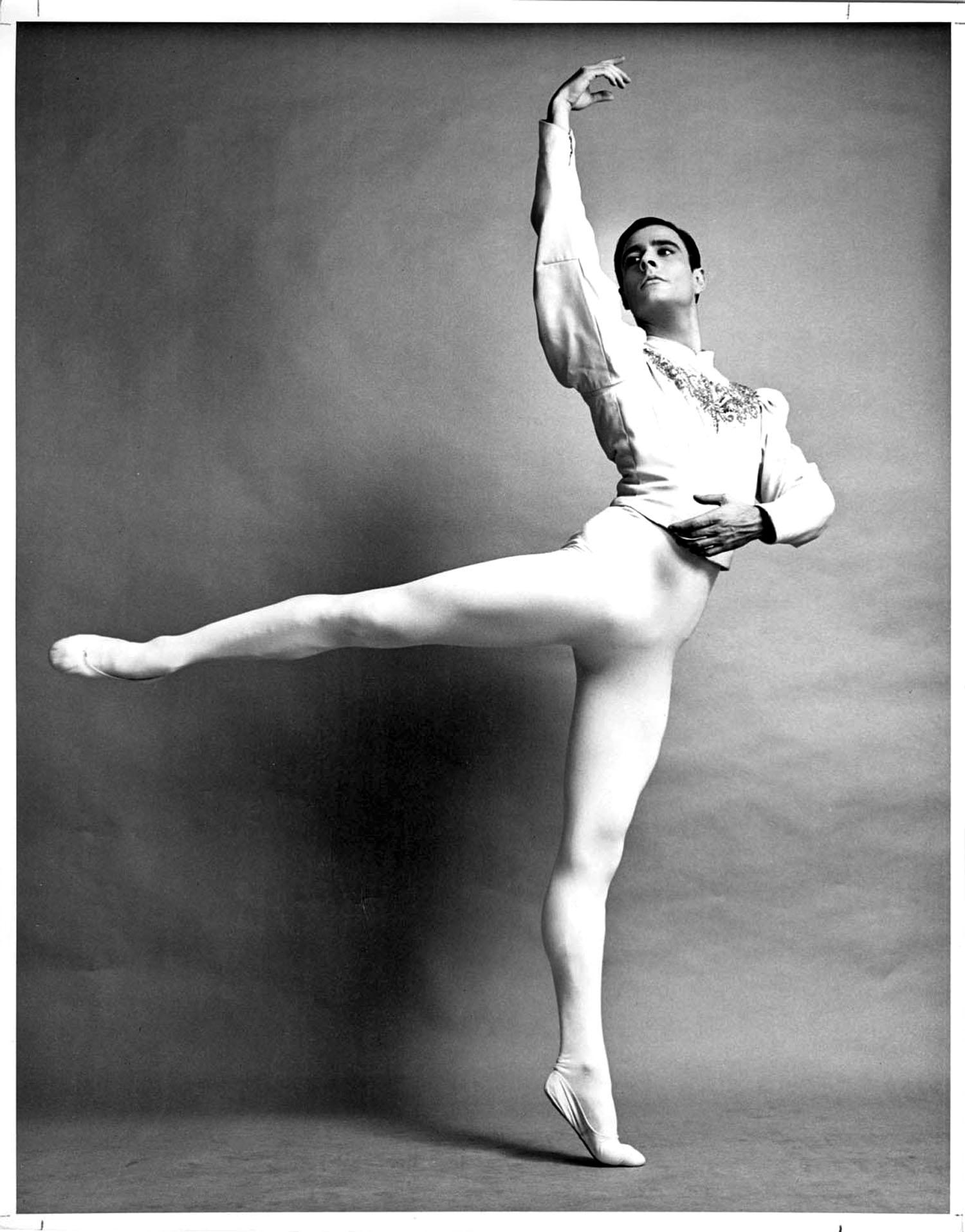
Ballet dancer Royes Fernandez was born in New Orleans.

Louisiana is home to one of the oldest Spanish-descended populations in the United States. During Spanish rule (1763–1803), colonial authorities encouraged immigration from Spain to the area.

The majority of them descend from Canarian settlers who arrived in Louisiana between 1778 and 1783. Its members are descendants of colonists from the Canary Islands, which is part of Spain off the coast of Africa. They settled in Spanish Louisiana between and intermarried with other communities such as French, Acadians, Creoles, and other groups, mainly through the 19th and early 20th centuries. The Isleños originally settled in four communities including Galveztown, Valenzuela, Barataria, and San Bernardo.

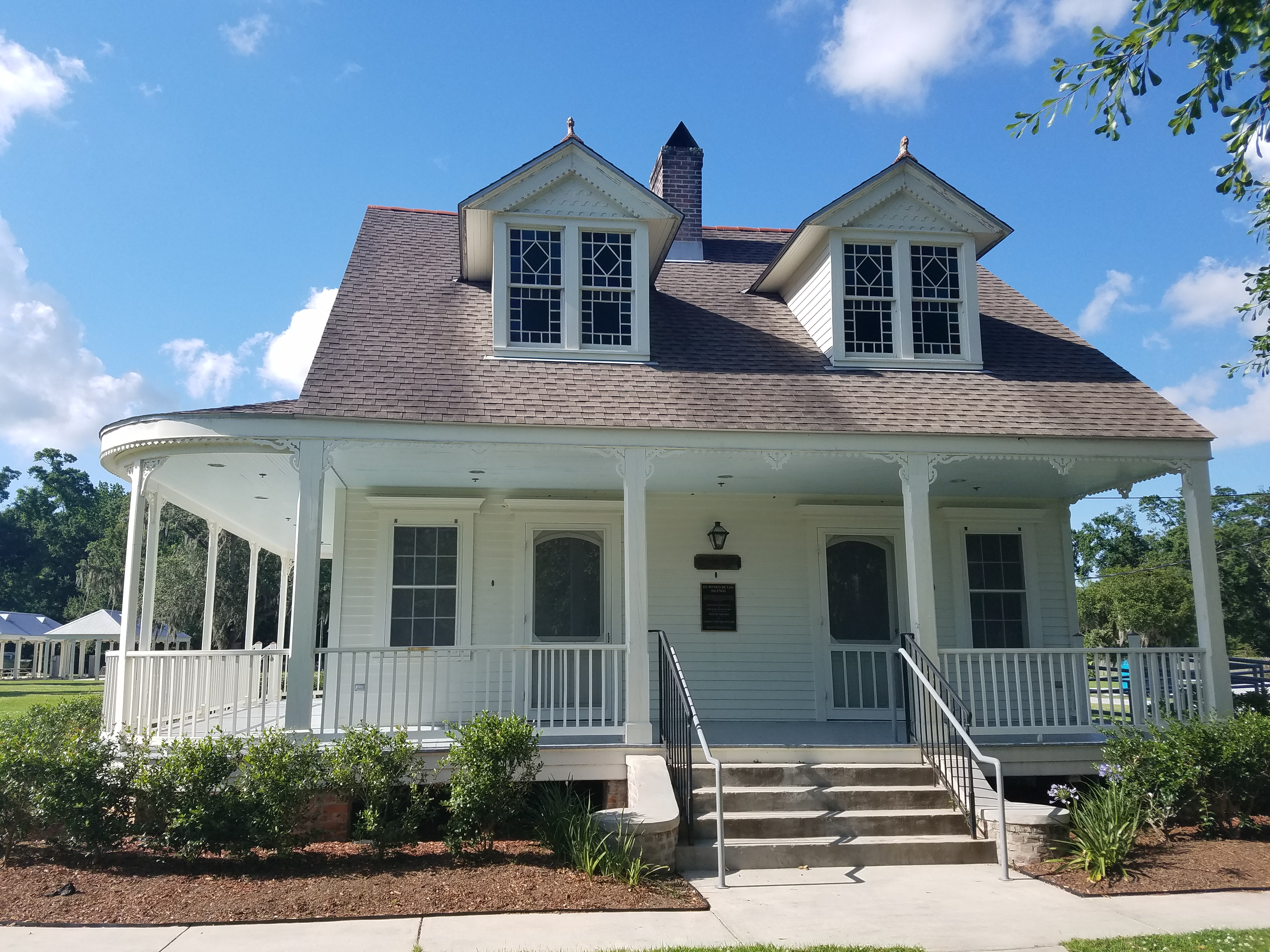
Los Isleños Museum Complex in Saint Bernard.

Following significant flooding of the Mississippi River in 1782, the Barataria settlement was abandoned and the survivors were relocated to San Bernardo and Valenzuela with some settling in West Florida.

Additional immigrants from mainland Spain settled in southern Louisiana. Colonists from the city of Málaga founded New Iberia, which became one of the most significant Spanish settlements in the colony.

In St. Bernard Parish, descendants of the Isleños preserved a unique Spanish dialect and cultural traditions well into the twentieth and twenty-first centuries, making Louisiana one of the few regions of the United States with a continuous Spanish-speaking heritage dating to the colonial era.

=== New Mexico ===
Hispanos of New Mexico (less commonly referred to as Neomexicanos or Nuevomexicanos) are descendants of Spanish and Mexican colonists who settled the area of New Mexico and Southern Colorado. Most made the journey from New Spain, now principally modern Mexico. The vast majority of these settlers married and mixed with the local indigenous people of New Mexico. Like the Californios and Tejanos, the descendants of these early settlers still retain a community of thousands of people in this state and that of southern Colorado.

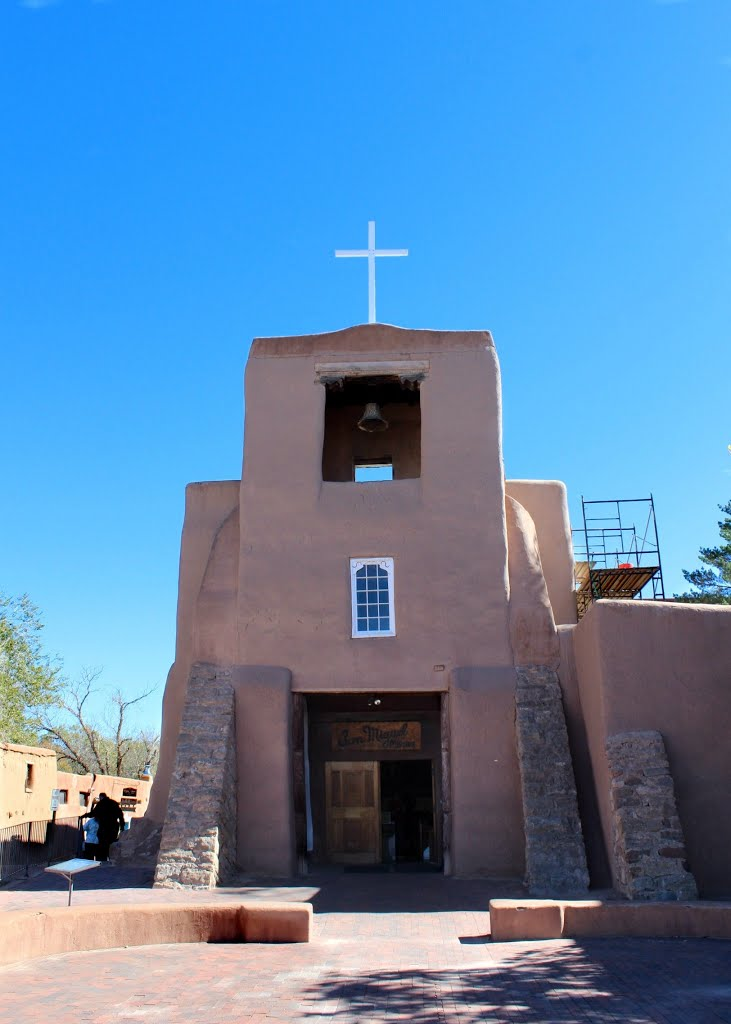
San Miguel Spanish Mission in Santa Fe.

New Mexico belonged to Spain for most of its modern history (16th century – 1821) and later to Mexico (1821–1848). The original name of the region was Santa Fé de Nuevo Mexico. The descendants of the settlers still retain a community of thousands of people in this state. Also, there is a community of Nuevomexicanos in Southern Colorado, due to shared colonial history. Currently, the majority of the Nuevomexicano population is distributed between New Mexico and Southern Colorado. Most of the Nuevomexicanos that live in New Mexico live in the northern half of the state. There are hundreds of thousands of Nuevomexicanos living in New Mexico. Those who claim to be descendants of the first Hispanic settlers in this state currently account as the first predominant ancestry in the state.

There is also a community of people in Southern Colorado descended from Nuevomexicanos that migrated there in the 19th century. The stories and language of the Nuevomexicanos from Northern New Mexico and Southern Colorado were studied by Nuevomexicano ethnographer, linguist, and folklorist Juan Bautista Rael and Aurelio Espinosa.

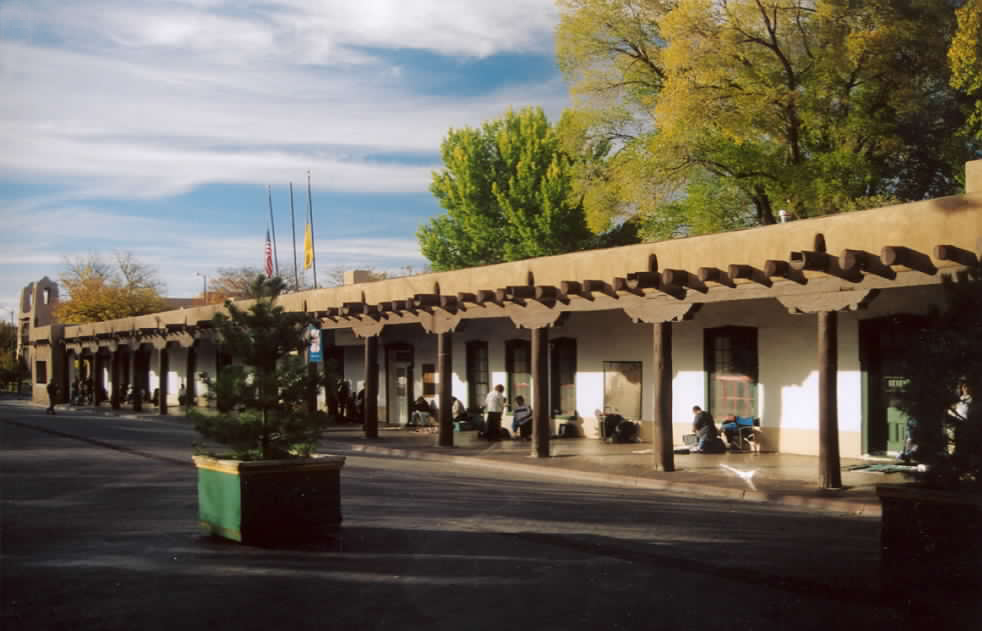
The Palace of the Governors in Santa Fe, one of the oldest public buildings in the United States, built during the Spanish rule.

The origins of the Nuevomexicano community date back to the arrival of Spanish colonists led by Juan de Oñate in 1598, who established the first permanent Spanish settlements in the region. In 1610, Santa Fe was founded as the capital of Santa Fe de Nuevo México and became one of the oldest continuously inhabited cities in the present-day United States. Due in part to the region's relative geographic isolation, many traditions of Spanish origin, including architectural styles, religious celebrations, folk customs, and varieties of New Mexican Spanish, were preserved for centuries and continue to form an important part of the state's cultural identity.

Many New Mexican Hispanos trace their ancestry directly to these early settlers, preserving a distinct cultural heritage that includes traditions, architecture, religious practices, and varieties of New Mexican Spanish.

=== New York ===
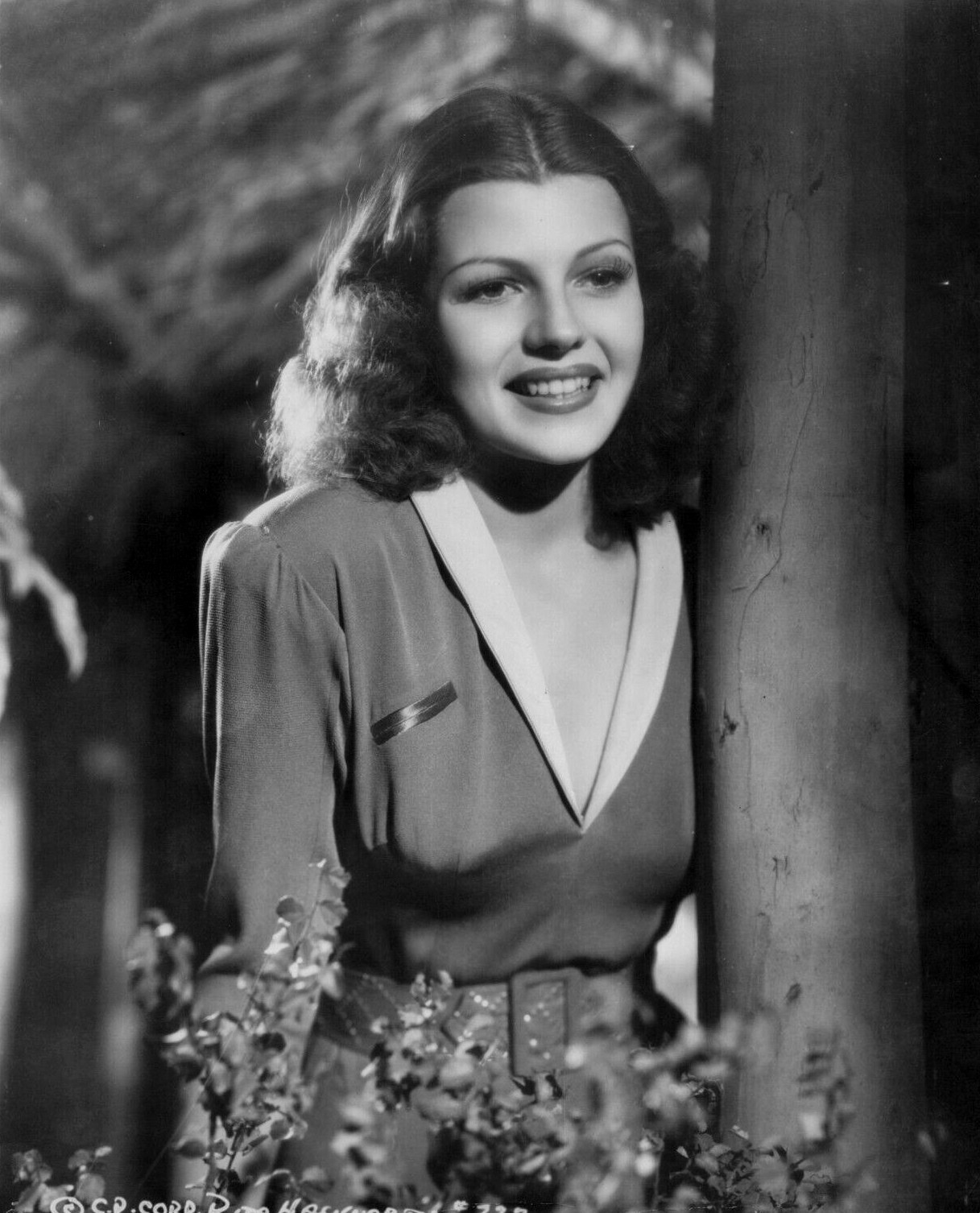
Actress Rita Hayworth, whose father was Spanish.

Beginning in the late nineteenth century and continuing through the early twentieth century, New York became one of the principal destinations for Spanish immigrants in the United States. Thousands arrived from Spanish regions such as Galicia, Asturias, Cantabria, the Basque Country, and Andalusia, seeking economic opportunities in commerce, industry, and maritime trades. By the 1930s, New York was home to one of the largest Spanish-born populations in the country, with community organizations, mutual aid societies, newspapers, restaurants, and cultural institutions serving the growing immigrant population.

Spanish immigrants established numerous social and charitable organizations throughout the city. Institutions such as La Nacional—officially the Spanish Benevolent Society, founded in 1868—provided financial assistance, healthcare support, cultural activities, and educational opportunities for Spanish immigrants and their families. La Nacional remains one of the oldest Spanish mutual aid societies in the United States and continues to preserve the heritage of the Spanish-American community in New York.

New York also became an important center of political and cultural activity for Spanish exiles and expatriates during and after the Spanish Civil War. Intellectuals, artists, academics, and refugees settled in the city, contributing to Spanish-language journalism, education, and cultural life while maintaining ties with Spain and other Hispanic communities throughout the Americas.

"Little Spain" was a Spanish American neighborhood in the New York City borough of Manhattan during the 20th century.

Little Spain was on 14th Street, between Seventh and Eighth Avenues. A very different section of Chelsea existed on a stretch of 14th Street often referred to by residents as "Calle Catorce," or "Little Spain". The Church of Our Lady of Guadalupe (No. 299) was founded in 1902, when Spaniards started to settle in the area. Although the Spanish businesses have given way to such nightclubs as Nell's and Oh Johnny on the block between Seventh and Eighth Avenues, the Spanish food and gift emporium known as Casa Moneo was at 210 West 14th from 1929 until the 1980s.

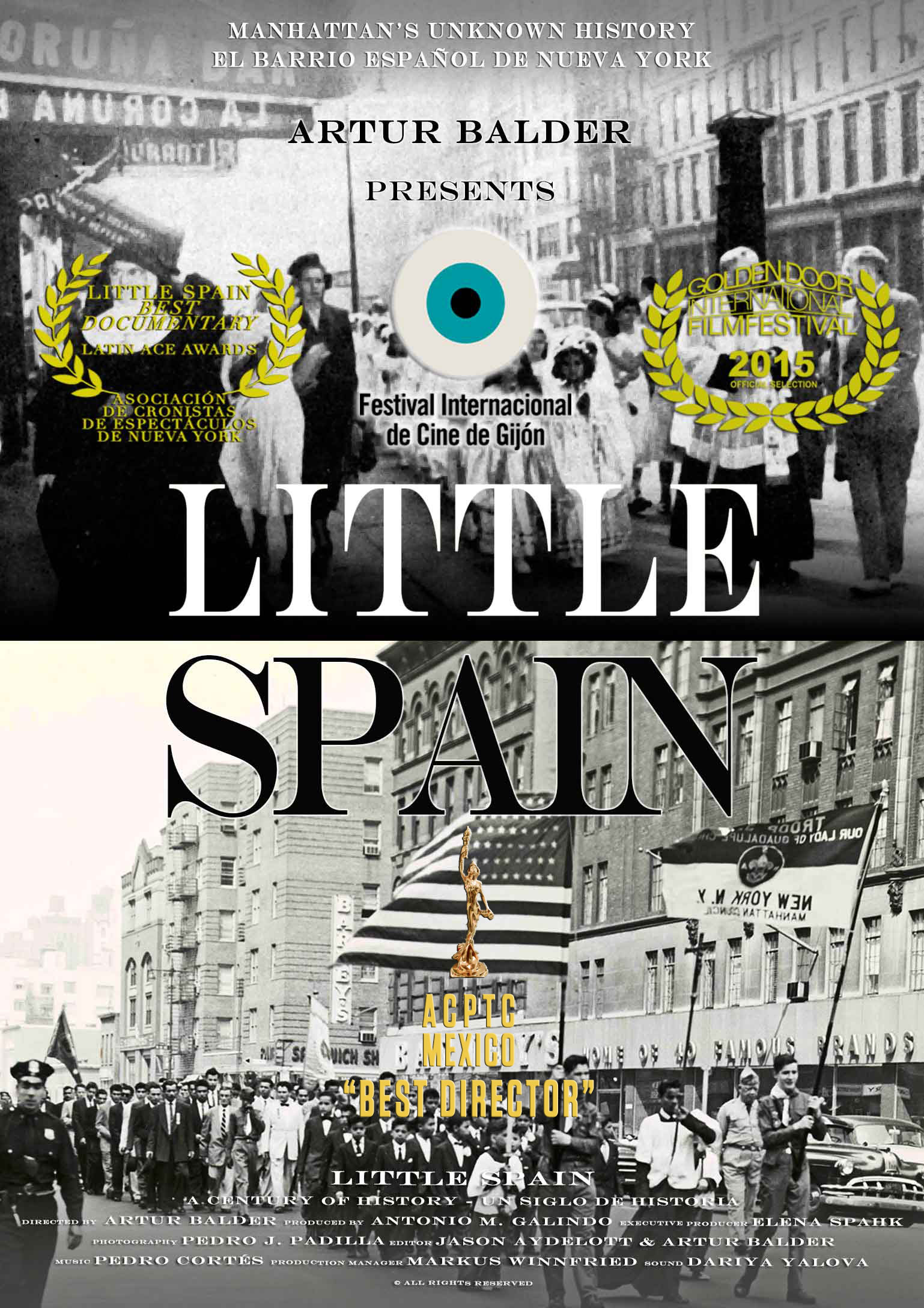
Poster for Little Spain (2010), a documentary exploring the history of the neighborhood.

In 2010 the documentary Little Spain, directed and written by Artur Balder, was filmed in New York City. The documentary pulled together for first time an archive that reveals the untold history of the Spanish-American presence in Manhattan. They present the history of the streets of Little Spain in New York City throughout the 20th Century. The archive contains more than 450 photographs and 150 documents that have never been publicly displayed.

Other important commerces and Spanish business of Little Spain were restaurants like La Bilbaína, Trocadero Valencia, Bar Coruña, Little Spain Bar, Café Madrid, Mesón Flamenco, or El Faro Restaurant, established 1927, and still today open at 823 Greenwich St. The Iberia was a famous Spanish dress shop.

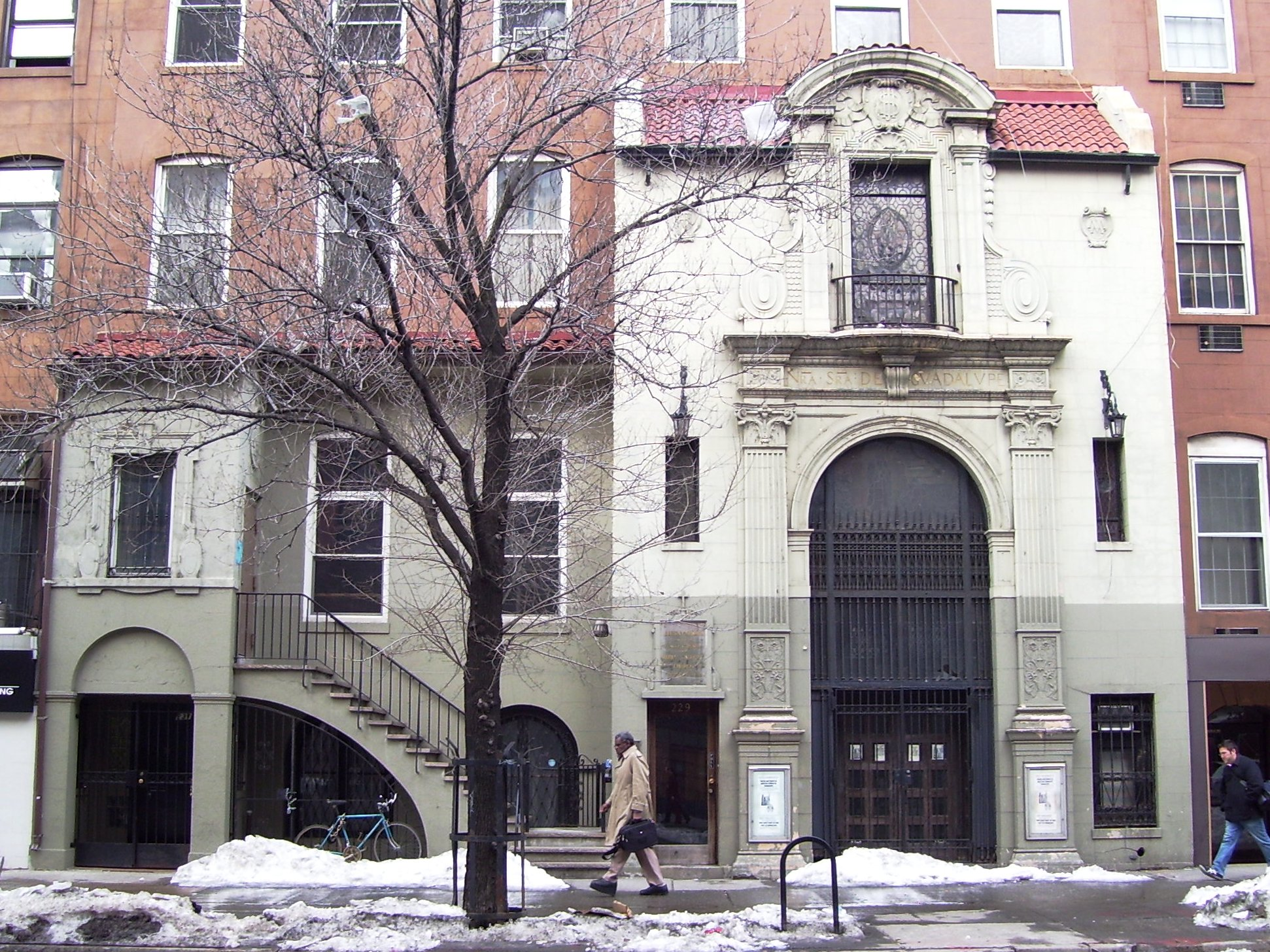
The Church of Our Lady of Guadalupe in Little Spain, important nucleus for many decades.

The heart of the Spanish American community in that area were the two landmarks: the Spanish Benevolent Society and the Roman Catholic Church of Our Lady of Guadalupe, founded at the turn of the 19th century, being the first parish in Manhattan with mass in Latin and Spanish.

Another area of influence is the Unanue family of Goya Foods. Its founder, Prudencio Unanue Ortiz, migrated from Spain in the 20th century and established Goya Foods, the largest Hispanic-owned food company in the United States. The family's members include Joseph A. Unanue and Andy Unanue. Goya Foods is the 377th largest private American company.

=== West Virginia ===
In the early 1900s, thousands of Spaniards (mainly from Asturias) migrated to West Virginia. The Asturian diaspora in West Virginia was mainly connected to region's zinc refining industry in towns such as Ziesling (Spelter) and Moundsville, WV. Asturians that immigrated to the state typically came from the Gozón and Piedras Blancas regions of Asturias and the surrounding communities, like Luanco, Avilés, and Castrillón. Most had ties to the zinc production in Arnao and the Royal Asturian Mining Company. In the Asturian-American towns in West Virginia, the Spanish families retained their language and culture, making Spanish chorizo in backyards and speaking Bable and Spanish to each other.

== Culture ==
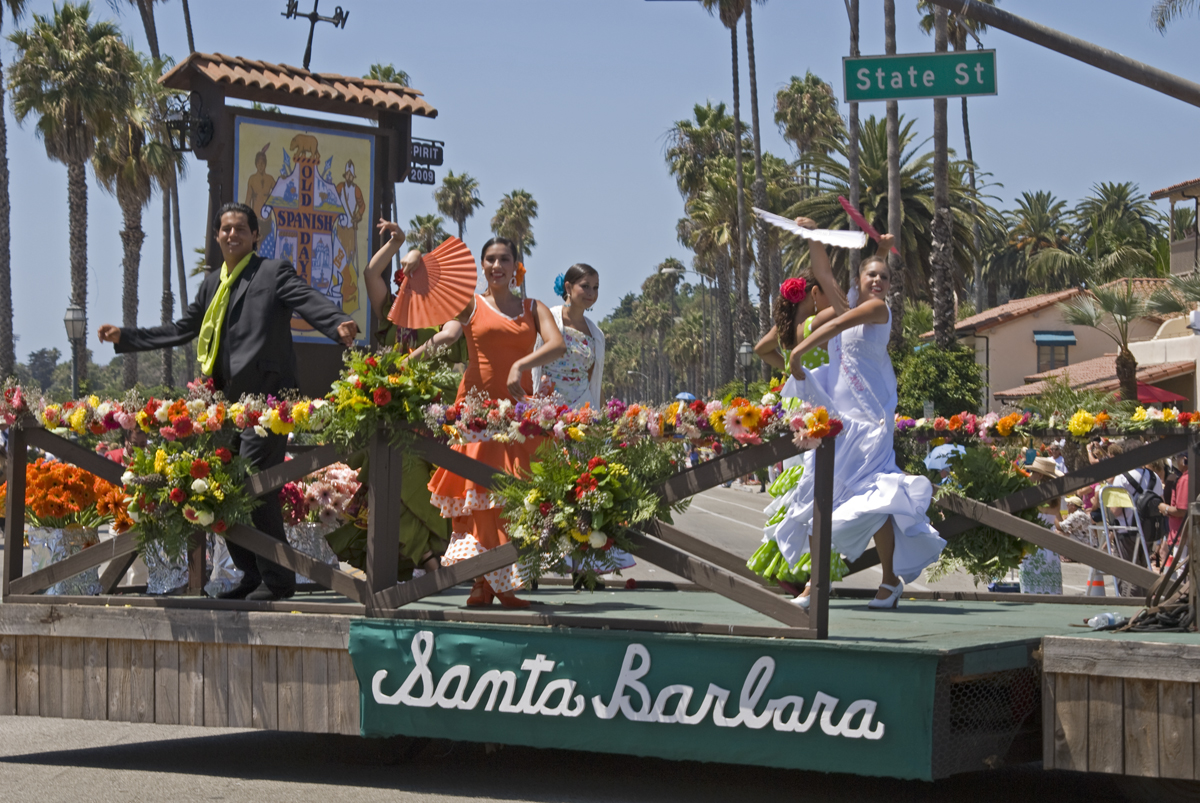
Santa Barbara, California’s annual Old Spanish Days fiesta celebration

Many Spanish Americans still retain aspects of their culture. This includes Spanish food, drink, art, annual fiestas. Spaniards have contributed to a vast number of areas in the United States of America. Flamenco is popular in New Mexico.

One of the most prominent celebrations of Spanish heritage in the United States is the annual Old Spanish Days Fiesta in Santa Barbara, California, which commemorates the city's Spanish and Mexican historical heritage through parades, music, dance, and traditional costumes.

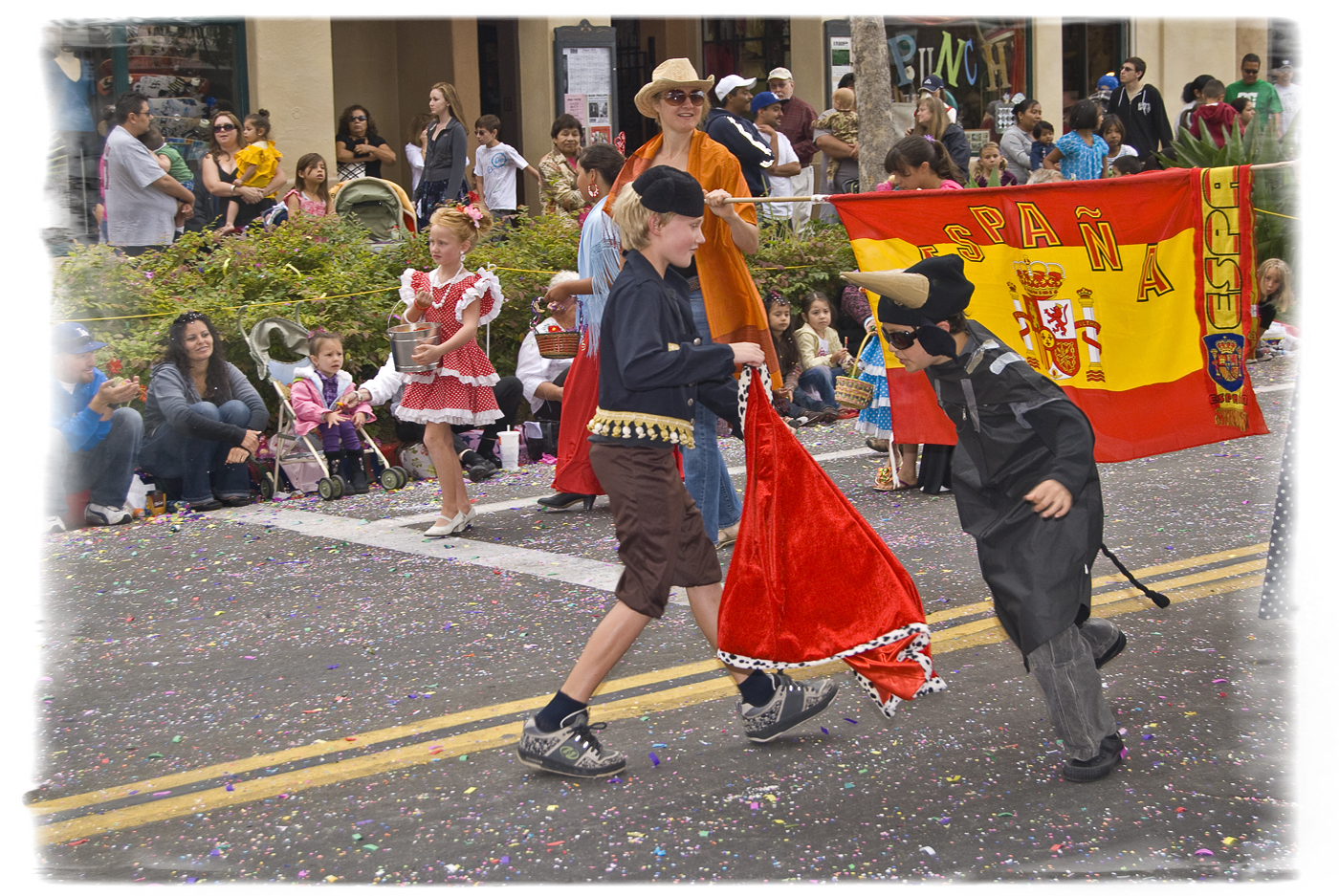
Representation of a traditional Spanish bullfighting scene during Santa Barbara's annual Old Spanish Days Fiesta

Spanish Americans continue to celebrate traditional Spanish festivities, including Three Kings Day (Día de los Reyes Magos), regional festivals, and cultural heritage events. Communities with strong Spanish heritage, particularly in New Mexico and California, organize annual celebrations that commemorate Spanish traditions and historical ties to Spain.

American media representation frequently homogenizes Spanish individuals with Mexican or mixed-race Latin American identities, overlooking European demographics.

=== Sports ===
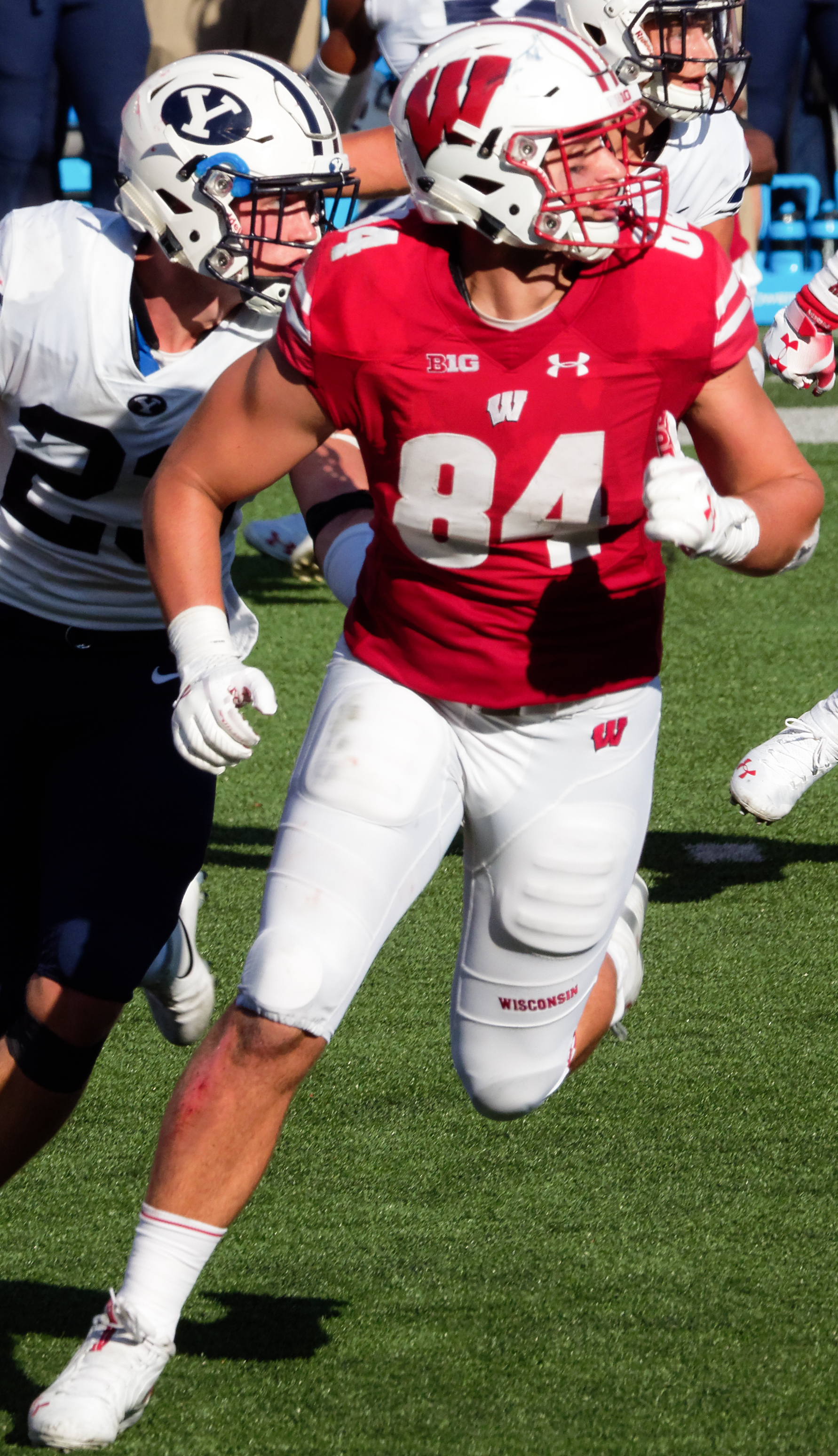
Jake Ferguson with the Dallas Cowboys.

- Some notable Spanish-American athletes include:
  - American football: Jake Ferguson, tight end for the Dallas Cowboys in the National Football League (NFL), who has Spanish ancestry through his family from Asturias, Spain.
  - American football: Alejandro Villanueva, former offensive tackle in the NFL who played for the Pittsburgh Steelers and Baltimore Ravens, born in Mississippi to Spanish parents while his father, a Spanish Navy officer, was stationed there with NATO.
  - Baseball: Keith Hernandez, former Major League Baseball first baseman and five-time All-Star, whose paternal family line traces back to Málaga, Spain through his Spanish grandfather.
  - Baseball: Pete Alonso, first baseman for the New York Mets, whose paternal grandfather was a Spanish refugee from Barcelona who emigrated to New York City during the Spanish Civil War.
  - Soccer: Luca de la Torre, professional soccer player born in San Diego, California, to a Spanish father from Spain and an American mother, who has represented the United States men's national team.

=== Cuisine ===
In the early 20th century, Prudencio Unanue Ortiz and his wife Carolina, both Puerto Ricans born in Spain, established Goya Foods, the largest Hispanic-owned food company in the United States.

The colonial era left a lasting Spanish impact on California, Louisiana, Florida, and the Southwestern states, but modern immigration to the United States has been much more geographically varied. Large groups of Spaniards settled in New York, the busiest immigration port on the Atlantic Coast today, and this city remains the main hub for importing Spanish food products, largely due to the rising popularity of Spanish-themed restaurants and chefs incorporating ingredients like chorizo, jamón, olives, marcona almonds, and anchovies. In the early 1900s, Andalusians from southern Spain moved to Hawaii to work on sugar and fruit plantations, but many later returned to mainland California, especially the San Francisco area, which already had a significant Spanish population from the Basque region.

=== Religion ===
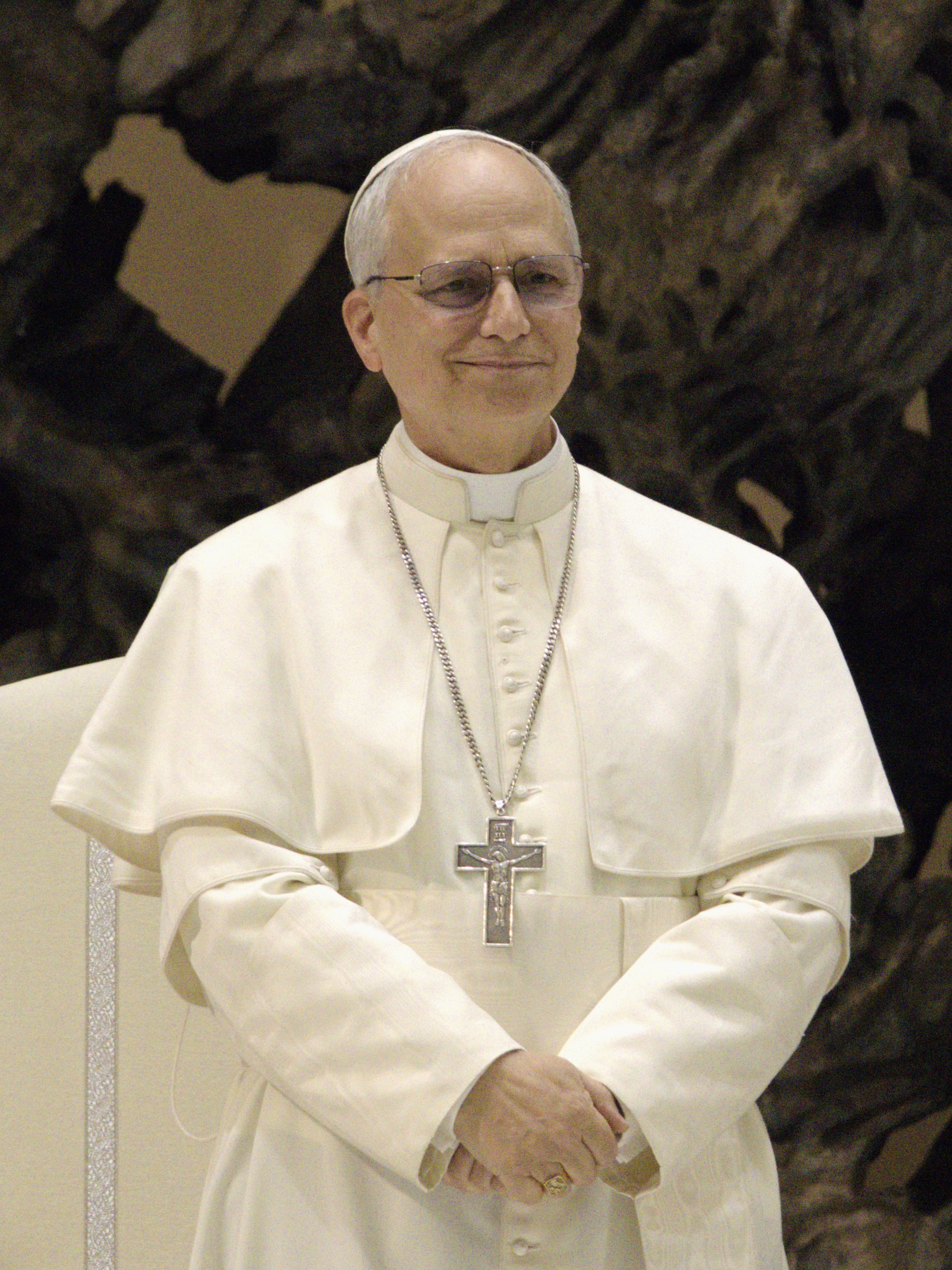
Pope Leo XIV is of maternal Spanish descent.

Many Spanish Americans are more active in Catholic church activities than was common in past generations in Spain; they rarely change their religious affiliation and participate frequently in family-centered ecclesiastical rituals. In both Spain and the United States, events such as first communions and baptisms are felt to be important social obligations that strengthen clan identity.

=== Spanish language in the U.S. ===
Spanish was the second European language spoken in North America after Old Norse, the language of the Viking settlers. It was brought to the territory of what is the contemporary United States of America in 1513 by Juan Ponce de León. In 1565, the Spaniards founded St. Augustine, Florida, the oldest continuously occupied European settlement in the modern U.S. territory.

Like other descendants of European immigrants, Spaniards have adopted English as their primary language.

Language spoken at home and ability to speak English (2013 ACS)
Spaniard – Language spoken and ability	Percent
Population 5 years and over	703,504
English only	68.5%
Language other than English	31.5%
Speak English less than "very well"	7.1%

=== Socioeconomics ===
Since Spanish American entrance into the middle class has been widespread, the employment patterns described above have largely disappeared. This social mobility has followed logically from the fact that throughout the history of Spanish immigration to the United States, the percentage of skilled workers remained uniformly high. In the first quarter of the twentieth century, for example, 85 percent of Spanish immigrants were literate, and 36 percent were either professionals or skilled craftsmen. A combination of aptitude, motivation, and high expectations led to successful entry into a variety of fields.

== Number of Spanish Americans ==
=== Census data ===
==== 1980 ====
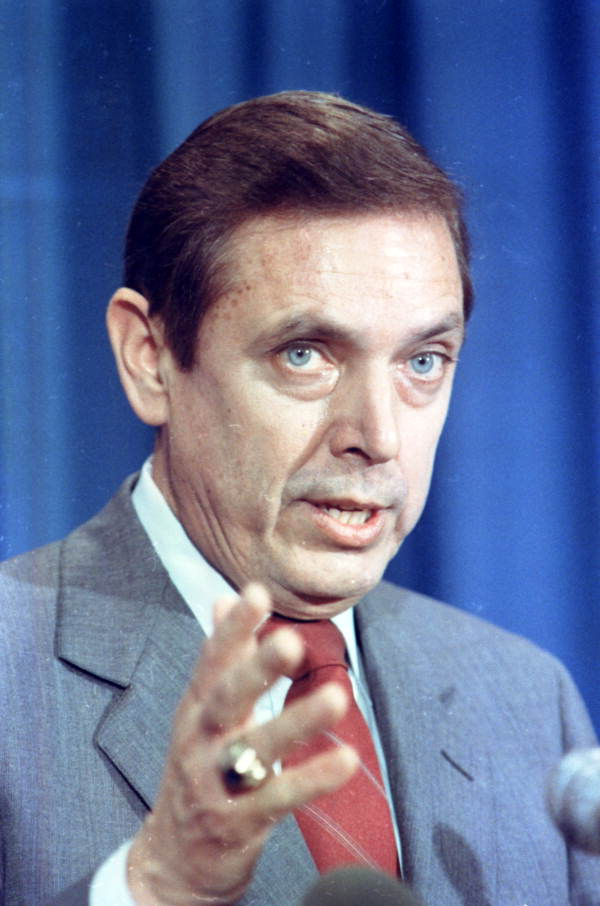
Bob Martinez was the first person of Spanish descent to be elected as Governor of Florida.

In 1980, 62,747 Americans claimed only Spaniard ancestry and another 31,781 claimed Spaniard along with another ethnic ancestry. 2.6 million or 1.43% of the total U.S. population chose to identify as "Spanish/Hispanic", however this represents a general type of response which will encompass a variety of ancestry groups. Spanish Americans are found in relative numbers throughout United States, particularly in the Southwestern and Gulf Coast. According to the 1980 U.S. census 66.4% reported Spaniard as their main ancestry, while 62.7% reported Spanish/Hispanic as their main ancestry. The table showing those who self-identified as Spaniard are as follows:

Response	Number	Percent	Northeast	North Central	South	West
Single ancestry	62,747	66.4%	24,048	3,011	23,123	12,565
Multiple ancestry	31,781	33.6%	9,941	2,209	11,296	8,335
Total reported	94,528		33,989	5,220	34,419	20,900

State	Spaniard	Spanish/Hispanic	%
Florida	23,698	249,196	2.6
New York	21,860	359,574	2.0
California	14,357	539,285	2.3
New Jersey	8,122	126,983	1.7
Texas	6,883	221,568	1.6
Colorado	1,985	154,396	5.3
New Mexico	1,971	281,189	21.6
Louisiana	616	79,847	1.9
United States	94,528	2,686,680	1.43%

==== 1990 ====
At a national level the ancestry response rate was high with 90.4% of the total United States population choosing at least one specific ancestry, 11.0% did not specify their ancestry, while 9.6% ignored the question completely. Of those who chose Spaniard, 312,865 or 86.7% of people chose it as their first and main ancestry response while 48,070 or 13.3% chose it as their second ancestry. Totals for the 'Spaniard' showed a considerable increase from the previous census. Table shows population by state of those self identifying as Spaniard.

State	Population	%
Florida	78,656	0.6
California	74,787	
New York	42,309	
Texas	31,226	
New Mexico	24,861	
New Jersey	23,666	
Colorado	14,052	
Arizona	6,385	
United States	360,935	0.1

As with the previous census 'Spanish' was considered a general response which may have encompassed a variety of ancestral groups. Over two million self-identified with this response.

==== 2000 ====
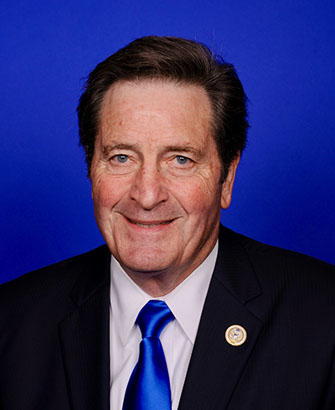
John Garamendi, 46th Lieutenant Governor of California

In 2000, 299,948 Americans specifically reported their ancestry as "Spaniard", which was a significant decrease over the 1990 data, where in those who reported "Spaniard" numbered 360,858. Another 2,187,144 reported "Spanish" and 111,781 people, reported "Spanish American". To this figures we must adhere some groups of Spanish origin or descent that specified their origin, instead of in Spain, in some of the Autonomous communities of Spain, specially Spanish Basques (9,296 people), Castilians (4,744 people), Canarians (3,096 people), Balearics (2,554 people) and Catalans (1,738 people). Less of 300 people indicated be of Asturian, Andalusian, Galician, and Valencian origin.

- Spaniard – 299,948
- Spanish – 2,187,144
- Spanish American – 111,781

==== 2010 ====
The 2010 census is the twenty-third United States national census.

- Spaniard – 635,253

Statistics for those who self-identify as ethnic Spaniard, Spanish, Spanish American in the 2010 American Community Survey.

- Spaniard – 694,494
- Spanish – 482,072
- Spanish American – 48,810

==== 2020 ====
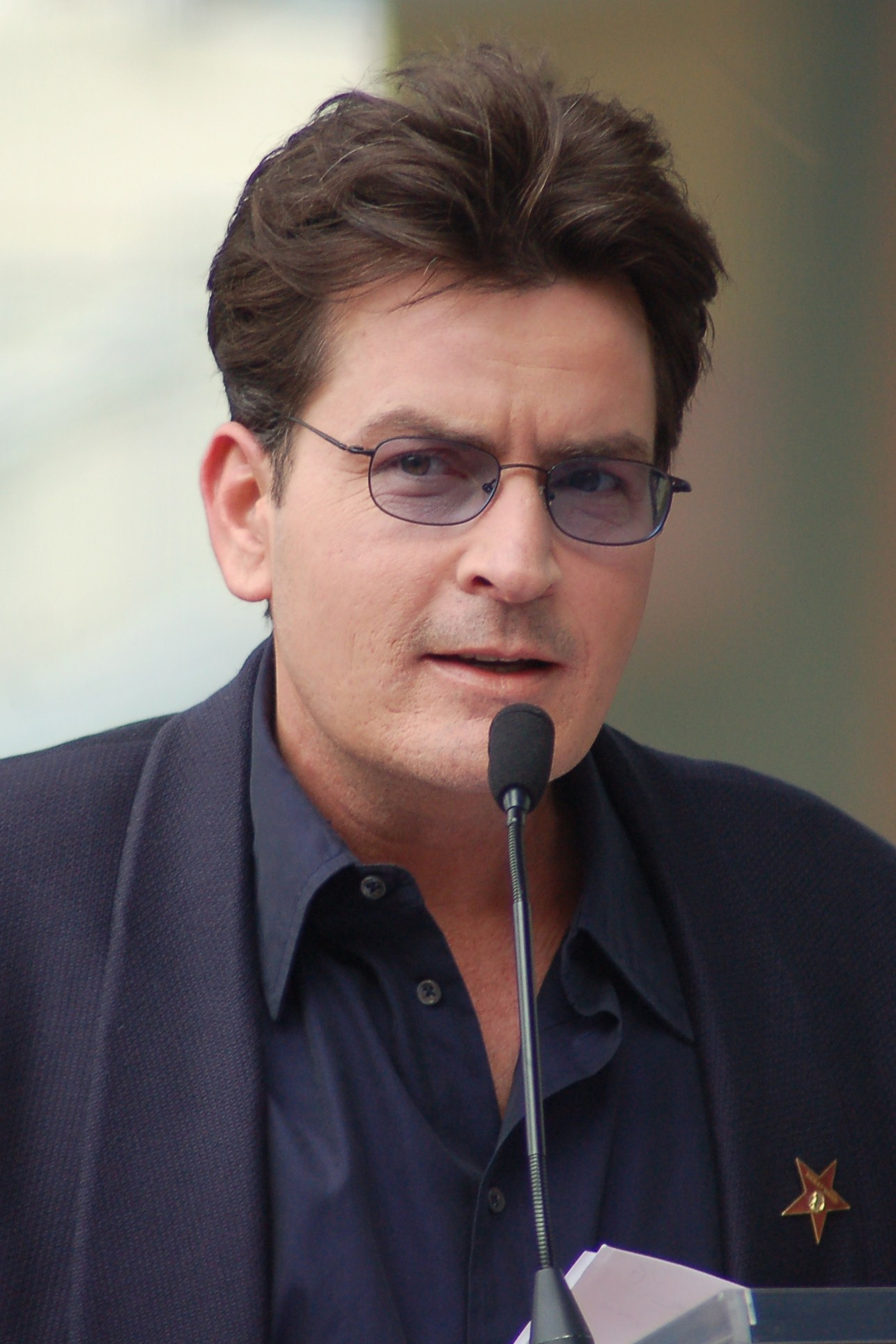
Charlie Sheen, an American actor with a Spanish paternal grandfather

In the most-recent 2020 census 978,978 people reported "Spaniard".

The top 10 states with the largest population who identified their ethnic origins as "Spaniard" in the 2020 census.

U.S. state		Population
(California)	California	192,312
(Texas)	Texas	120,116
(Florida)	Florida	83,479
(New Mexico)	New Mexico	79,882
(Colorado)	Colorado	58,290
(New York (state))	New York	51,714
(Arizona)	Arizona	36,636
(New Jersey)	New Jersey	31,471
(Washington (state))	Washington	26,478
(Illinois)	Illinois	18,842
U.S. born		TBA
Foreign-born		TBA
(United States)	Total	978,978

In 2020, 866,356 people identified with "Spanish origin", making them the eleventh largest Hispanic group residing in the United States. This number includes people whose ancestors immigrated directly or indirectly from Spain.

== Political participation ==
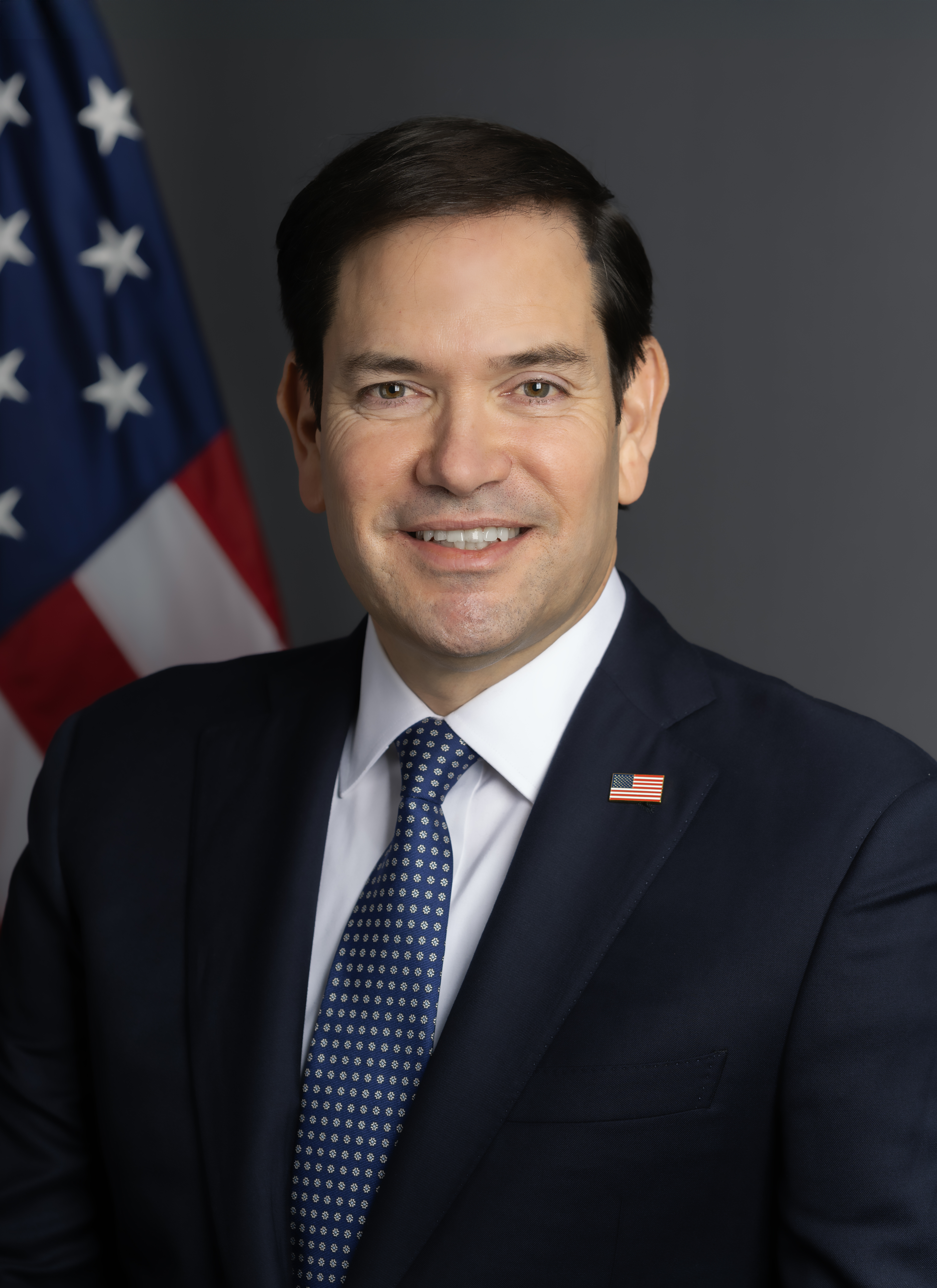
Marco Rubio, the 72nd United States secretary of state since 2025 said he was of Spanish and Italian heritage, mentioning ancestors from Seville.

With the outbreak of the Spanish Civil War in 1936 a number of intellectual political refugees found asylum in the United States. Supporters of the overthrown Spanish Republic, which had received aid from the Soviet Union while under attack from Nationalist forces, were sometimes incorrectly identified with communism, but their arrival in the United States well before the "red scare" of the early 1950s spared them the worst excesses of McCarthyism. Until the end of the dictatorship in Spain in 1975 political exiles in the United States actively campaigned against the abuses of the Franco regime.

== Place names of Spanish origin ==
This is a partial list only. Please see the main article above.

Year	Population
1980	94,528
1990	360,935
2000	299,948
2010	635,253
2017	801,636

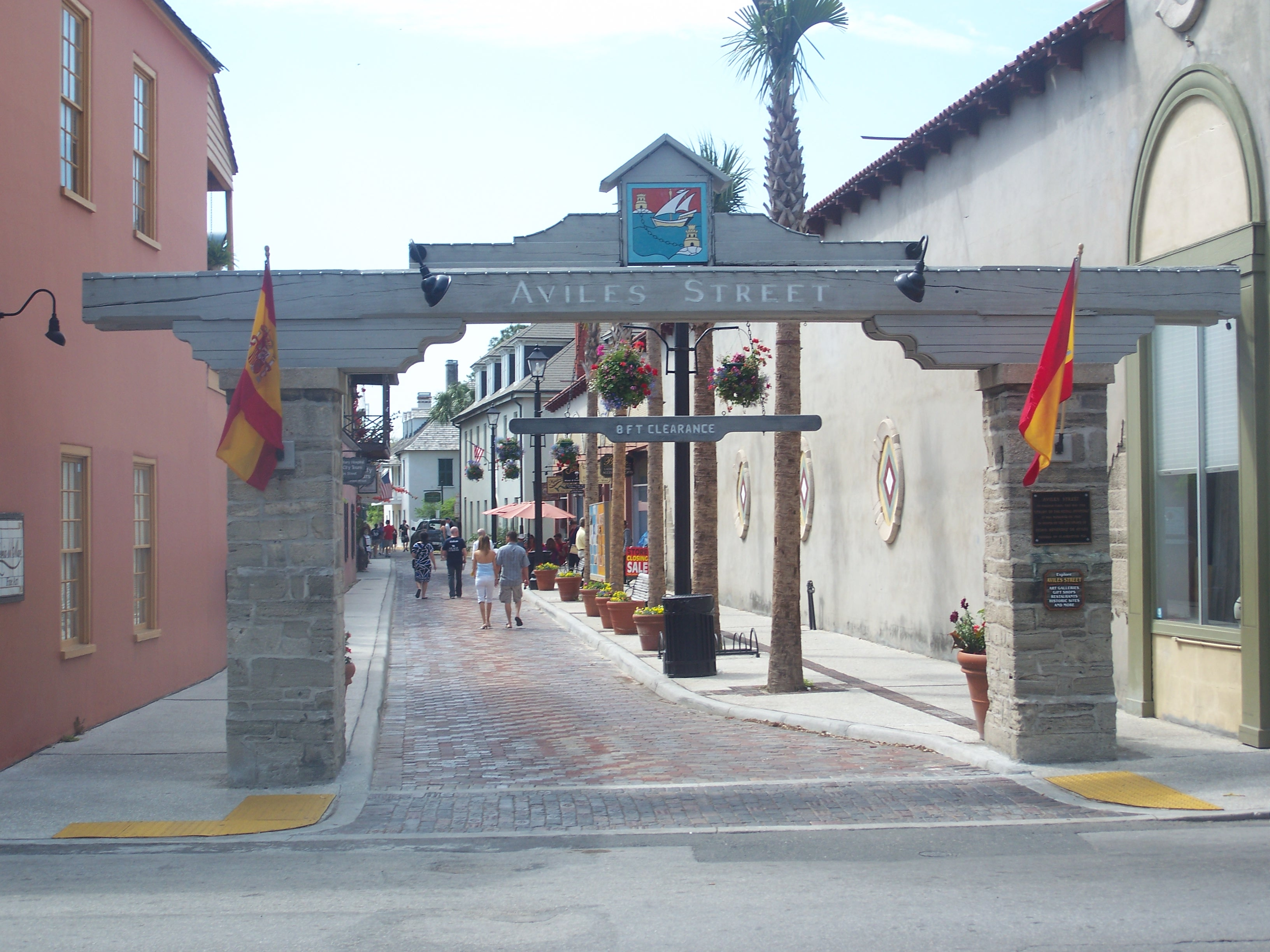
Aviles Street in the St. Augustine Town Plan Historic District, claims to be the oldest street in the nation.

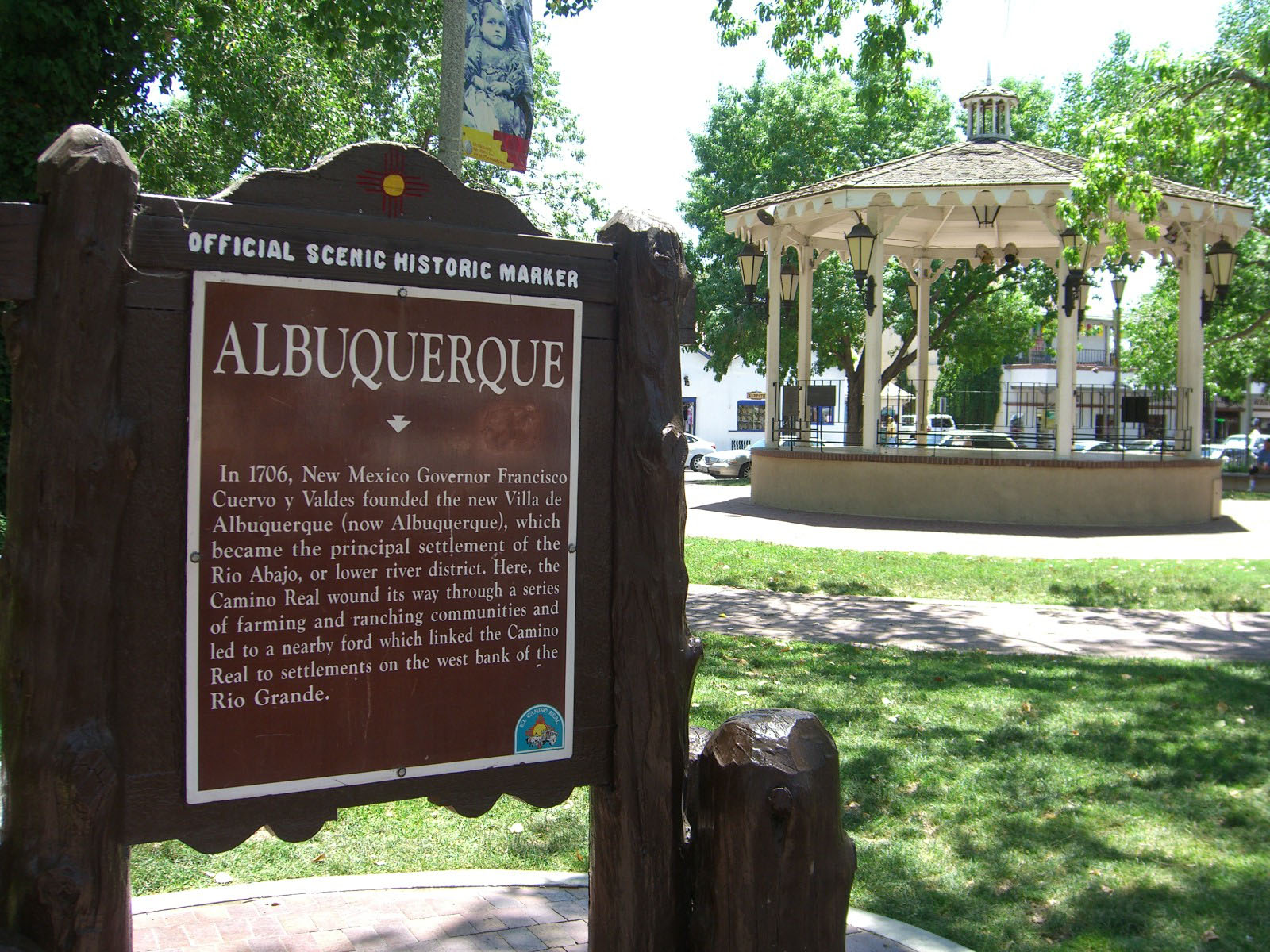
Albuquerque was founded by Don Francisco Cuervo y Valdez.

- Arizona – possibly from a Spanish word of Basque origin meaning "The Good Oak" (haritz ona). However, the toponym does not come from the term Zona Árida.
  - Mesa – means "Table"; Spanish explorers used the word because the tops of mesas look like the tops of tables.
  - Sierra Vista – "Mountain View"
- California – the state was named for a mythical land described in a popular Spanish novel from around 1500, Las sergas de Esplandián ("The exploits of Esplandián") by Garci Rodríguez de Montalvo.
  - Alcatraz Island – "Gannet Island"
  - Chula Vista – "Beautiful View"
  - Los Angeles – "City of Angels"
  - Sacramento – "City of the Sacrament"
  - San Bernardino – "Saint Bernard"
  - Santa Cruz – "City of the Holy Cross"
  - San Diego – "Saint Didacus"
  - San Francisco – "Saint Francis"
  - San Jose – "Saint Joseph"
  - Santa Barbara – "Saint Barbara"
- Florida – "Flowery".
  - Boca Raton – "Shallow inlet of sharp–pointed rocks that scrape a ship's cables"
  - Key West – anglicization of Cayo Hueso ("Bone Island")
  - St. Augustine, Florida – anglicization of San Agustín, founded by Pedro Menéndez de Avilés
  - Sarasota – "Sheep skin"
  - Biscayne Bay – anglicization of Bayo Vizcayno ("Biscay Bay")
  - Pensacola – Hispanicization of the indigenous name for the region
  - Tampa – Hispanicization of the indigenous name for the region
  - Miami – Hispanicization of the indigenous name for the region
- Colorado – "Reddish".
  - Pueblo – "Town"
  - Alamosa – "Cottonwood"
  - Antonito – "Little Anthony"
- Montana – Montaña, "Mountain".
  - Lima – "Lime"
- New Mexico
  - Albuquerque, New Mexico – first called La Villa de San Francisco Xavier de Alburquerque, was founded as a Royal city by order of Don Francisco Cuervo y Valdés, 34th Governor of New Mexico, on February 7, 1706.
  - Española, New Mexico – "Spanish Woman"
  - Santa Fe – "Holy Faith"
  - Las Cruces – "The Crosses"
  - Madrid – although pronounced "MAD–rid", the city was named for the capital of Spain.
- Texas – Tejas in Spanish and "Slates" in English.
  - El Paso – "The Pass"
  - Amarillo – "Yellow"
  - San Antonio – "St. Anthony"
- Nevada – the name comes from the Spanish Nevada (Spanish: [neˈβaða]), meaning "Snow-covered", after the Sierra Nevada ("Snow-covered mountain range").
  - Las Vegas – "The Meadows"
- Oregon – Orejón, "big ear", or could come from Aragón.
  - Moro – "Moor"
  - Bonanza – "Prosperity"
  - Estacada – "Staked"
  - Manzanita – "Little apple"
  - Toledo – Spanish city of the same name

== See also ==
=== About Spanish Americans ===
- Spanish-American relations
- Spanish immigration to Hawaii
- Spanish cuisine
- Asturian Americans
- Canarian Americans
- Isleño
- Galician Americans
- Basque Americans
- Catalan Americans
- Floridanos
- Californio
- Tejano
- Nuevomexicano (New Mexican Spanish)
- Origins of New Mexico Families: A Genealogy of the Spanish Colonial Period
- El Centro Español de Tampa
- Centro Asturiano de Tampa
- History of Ybor City

=== About Hispanic Americans and Spanish Canadians ===
- White Americans
  - White Hispanic and Latino Americans
- Spanish Canadians
- Criollo people
- Hispanic Society of America
- Notable Hispanics
- White Hispanic
- White Latin Americans
- Hispanic
- Hispanic and Latino Americans
