= Little Spain (film) =

2011 documentary film by Artur Balder

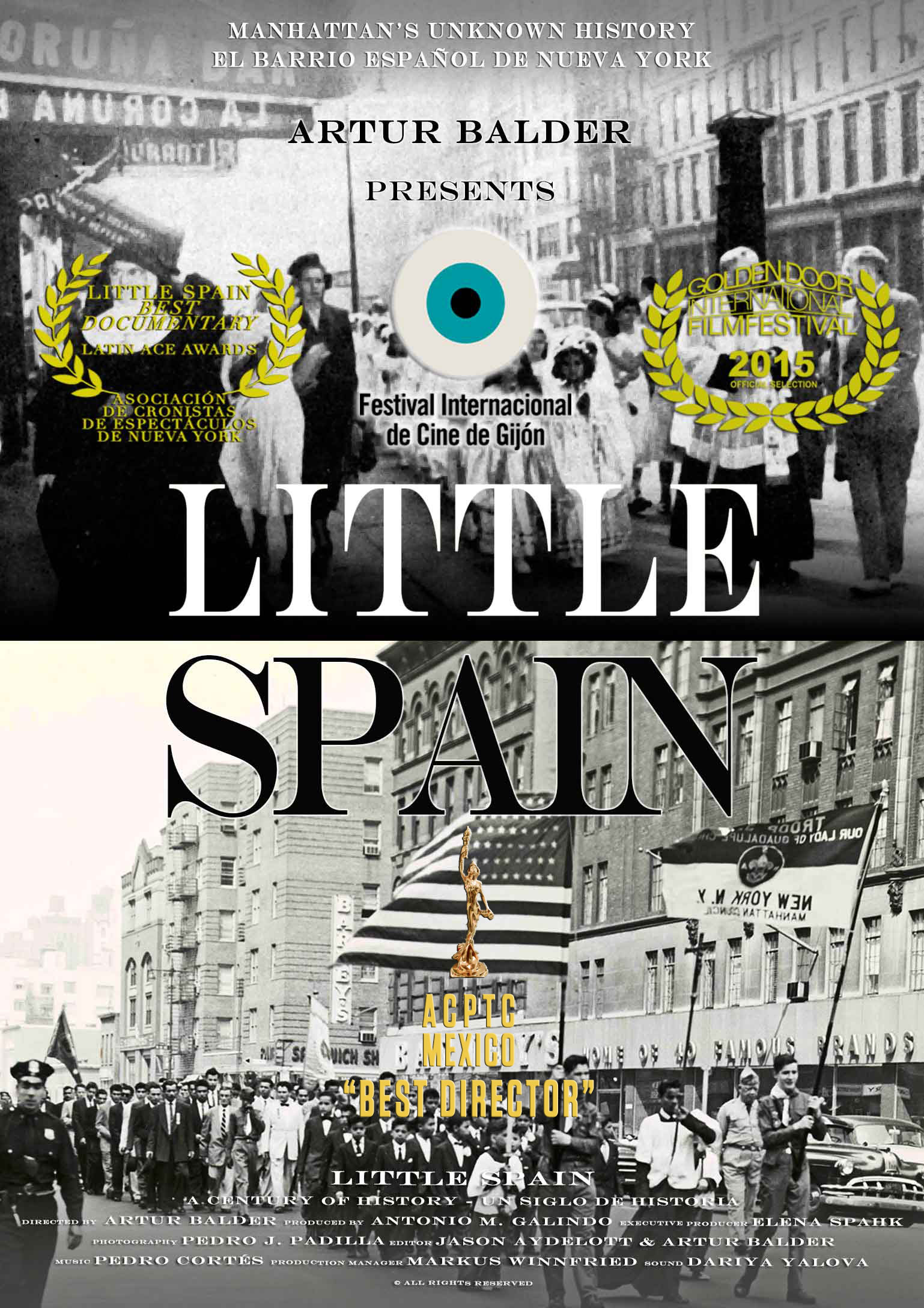
- DVD release poster
- Directed by: Artur Balder
- Written by: Artur Balder
- Narrated by: Robert Sanfiz
- Release date: 2011
- Running time: 59 minutes
- Country: United States

Little Spain (also titled Little Spain: A Century of History) is a 2011 American documentary film written and directed by Artur Balder about Little Spain, the former Spanish neighborhood on 14th Street in Manhattan, New York City. It was filmed in 2009 and 2010 at the Spanish Benevolent Society (La Nacional), where Balder was artist-in-residence, and draws on an archive of more than 450 photographs and 150 documents that had never been publicly displayed. In 2015 it received the Latin ACE Award for best documentary from the Association of Latin Entertainment Critics and was part of the official selection of the DOCUFICX section of the Gijón International Film Festival.

== Synopsis ==
The film tells the history of the Spanish community that lived on West 14th Street, between Seventh and Eighth Avenues, during the 20th century. It combines archive photographs and documents with on-camera testimonies of second-generation Spanish Americans and Hispanic Americans who describe the neighborhood in the 1940s, 1950s and 1960s. The narrator is Robert Sanfiz, president of La Nacional.

The film covers the Spanish Benevolent Society, founded in 1868; the Centro Vasco Americano, founded in 1913; and the area's Galician community. Among those interviewed are José Pérez and his son Joe Pérez, owners of El Faro Restaurant. It also covers Federico García Lorca, who lived at La Nacional, and the painter Joaquín Sorolla, who donated a portrait to the society. It closes with a surrealist epilogue in homage to Lorca that includes a reading from Poet in New York.

== Production ==
Balder made the film while he lived for more than a year as artist-in-residence at La Nacional, at 239 West 14th Street, in 2009 and 2010. The research produced an archive of more than 450 photographs and 150 documents that had never been publicly displayed.

== Release ==
Spanish and Spanish-language media, including El País, EFE, Antena 3, Telecinco and the Latin American Herald Tribune, reported on the documentary in November 2010. It was released in 2014 and distributed on DVD under institutional licenses to academic and public libraries, including those of Columbia University, Wellesley College, Smith College and the University of Massachusetts Amherst.

In 2015 it was part of the official selection of DOCUFICX, the documentary section of the Gijón International Film Festival, and was shown in theaters in Asturias.

== Reception ==
In a review for United Press International, Rafael Bernal described the film as a valuable addition to New York's immigration history. He called it "a community immigration story, as opposed to currently common solitary immigrant sagas", while noting that at times it was "excessively concerned with geographical minutiae". In ABC, José María Carrascal called it "un trabajo minucioso y extenso" ("a meticulous and extensive work"). The art critic Donald Kuspit, writing in El Cultural, described it as "a kind of masterpiece, in that it masters its subject matter even as it shows Balder's mastery of his medium".

== Accolades ==
In 2015 the film received the Latin ACE Award for best documentary of 2014 from the Association of Latin Entertainment Critics of New York.
