= Our Lady of Guadalupe at St. Bernard Church (Manhattan) =

Catholic church in Manhattan, New York

Coordinates: 40°44′24.7″N 74°0′15″W

Our Lady of Guadalupe at St. Bernard's Church
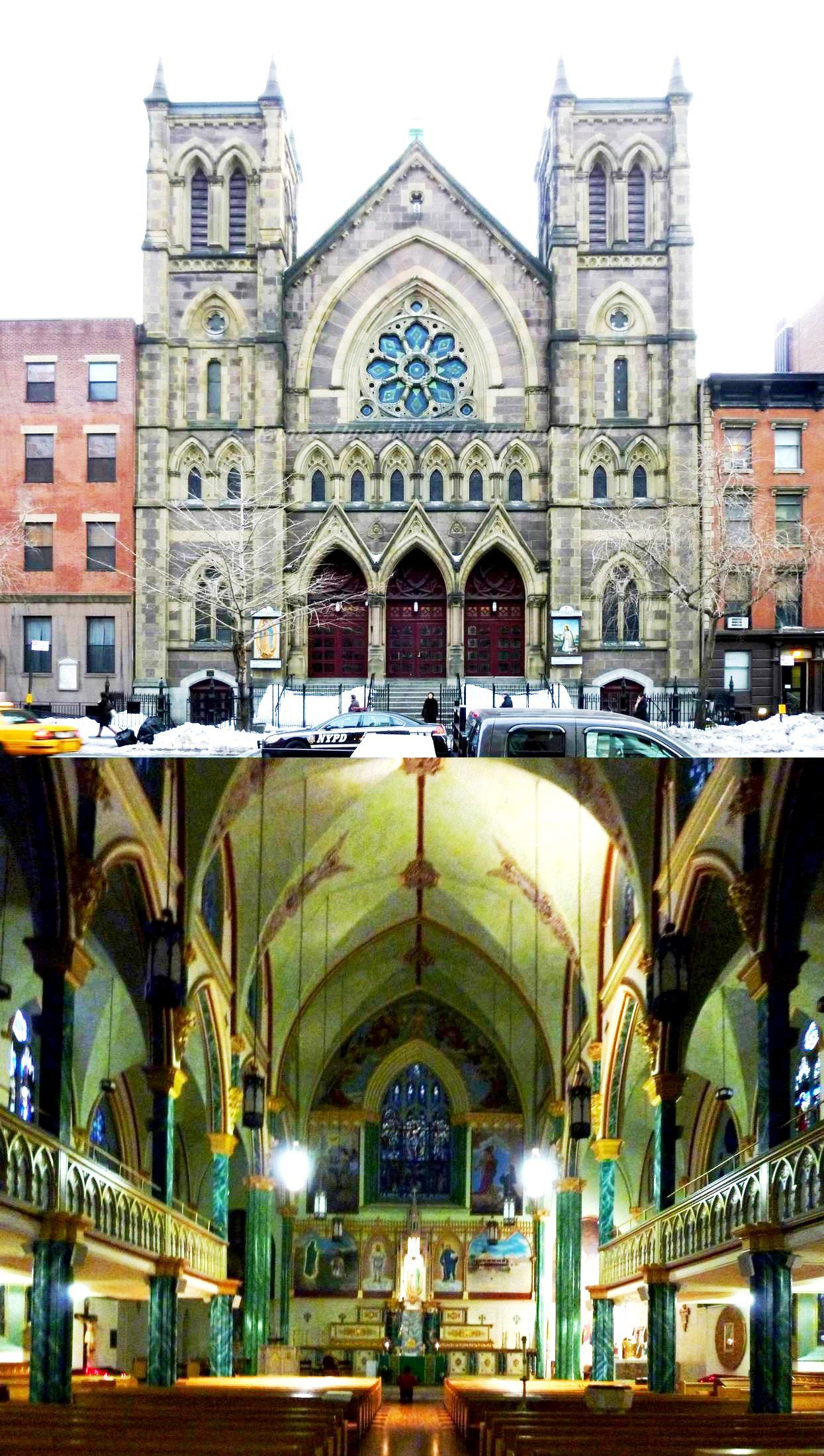
- Facade elevation and interior view from nave to altar sanctuary (Photographed February 2011)
- Interactive map of the Our Lady of Guadalupe at St. Bernard's Church area

General information
- Architectural style: English and French Gothic Revival; Ruskinian Gothic
- Location: Greenwich Village, Manhattan, New York City, New York, United States of America
- Construction started: May 1873
- Completed: 1875
- Client: Roman Catholic Archdiocese of New York

Design and construction
- Architect: Patrick Charles Keely (1816—1896)

Website
- Our Lady of Guadalupe @ St. Bernard's, Manhattan

The Church of Our Lady of Guadalupe and St. Bernard is a Roman Catholic parish church in the Roman Catholic Archdiocese of New York, located at 328-332 West 14th Street in the Greenwich Village neighborhood of Manhattan, New York City. It was established in 2003 as a result of a parish merger of the Manhattan parishes of Our Lady of Guadalupe and St. Bernard's Church.

== St. Bernard's Parish (1868-2003) ==
The parish of St. Bernard was established in 1868 for a congregation of mostly Irish immigrants and their descendants, which influenced the decision to hire the Irish-born prolific ecclesiastical architect of Roman Catholic churches and cathedrals, Patrick Keely. It was once considered one of the most important Catholic parishes in the city. The parish closed in 2003 after it merged with Our Lady of Guadalupe Church, which was located a block east on the same street, to create the parish of Our Lady of Guadalupe at St. Bernard's Church.

In the autumn of 1868 Mary Catherine Dannat Starr started a sewing school for girls at St. Bernard's to teach them skills in order to better their condition. She later went on to found the Sisters of the Divine Compassion.

== Our Lady of Guadalupe Parish (1902-2003) ==
The parish of Our Lady of Guadalupe was established in 1902 by the Augustinians of the Assumption as the first Spanish-speaking Catholic parish in New York City, serving working-class Spaniards. At the time, that area of 14th Street was considered "Little Spain". The parish was merged in 2003 with the neighboring St. Bernard Parish to create the Parish of Our Lady of Guadalupe & St. Bernard.

== Building ==
St. Bernard's Church was built from 1873 to 1875 to the designs of Patrick C. Keely and was the first church consecrated by an American Cardinal, Archbishop of New York John McCloskey. Once considered one of the most important parishes in the city, the congregation at the time of erection consisted of mostly Irish immigrants and their descendants. Irish-born architect Patrick Charles Keely's design of "twin towers, triple-portal entrance, and rose window inset into a pointed arch reveal a masterful blending of French and English influences." Also referenced as Ruskinian Gothic by the AIA Guide to NYC (2010) The interior features a prominent U-shaped gallery and many figurative stained-glass windows in the style of Mayers of Munich. The church has at least one Tiffany window. Presumably since the 2003 merger, the interior has been significantly redecorated and painted with many of the transferable art objects of Our Lady of Guadalupe parish moved here. The reredos has been painted with many scenes of Our Lady of Guadalupe and the Blessed Juan Diego, and the modern Basilica of Our Lady of Guadalupe.
