= Association of Latin Entertainment Critics =

Nonprofit cultural organization

The Association of Latin Entertainment Critics (Spanish: Asociación de Cronistas de Espectáculos de Nueva York) is a nonprofit cultural organization founded on December 12, 1967. The organization has bestowed the Latin ACE Awards (Premios ACE) annually since May 25, 1969. Since 1983, the organization has had a separate program of awards for achievements in music.

Notable artists honored by ACE include Juan Gabriel, Iris Chacón, Charytín, Plácido Domingo, Lupita Ferrer, Laura de la Uz, dancer-actress Yolanda Montez ("Tongolele"), Olga Guillot, Julio Iglesias, Camilo Sesto, José José, Rocío Jurado, Marga López, José Luis López Vázquez, Angélica María, Puerto Rican trumpeter Luis "Perico" Ortiz, Lucero, Silvia Pinal, Cuban percussionist Carlo "Patato" Valdez, and television journalists and talk-show hosts Don Francisco, Cristina Saralegui and Natalia Cruz.

Films honored by the Latin ACE Awards include Tie Me Up! Tie Me Down! (1991), and Little Spain by Artur Balder

In addition to its awards program, ACE sponsors lectures, musical events featuring Latino and Latina artists, training workshops and round–table discussions. The organization was recognized in the United States House of Representatives on March 27, 1992, by Rep. José E. Serrano (D–NY).

As of 2006, awards at the main ceremony are given in the areas of Variety, Theater, Film, Television, and Cable Television. Past awards have been given to musical artists as well; since 1983, the organization has hosted a separate Annual Musical Gala for these honors.
