= El Faro Restaurant =

- Interactive map of El Faro Restaurant

Restaurant information
- Established: 1927
- Closed: 2012
- Location: 823 Greenwich Street, West Village, Manhattan, New York, New York, New York, U.S.
- Coordinates: 40°44′19.21″N 74°0′22.96″W
- Website: www.elfaronyc.com

El Faro Restaurant was a small Spanish food emporium located at 823 Greenwich Street in the West Village of Manhattan, New York City. El Faro opened in 1927 and shuttered in 2012 after failing to raise over $80,000 to pay off fines and expenses.

Its first set of owners, Manuel Rivas and Edwardo Cabana, ran the establishment as a Spanish bar and grill. This area of New York was heavily populated with Irish immigrants who worked in the nearby meatpacking houses, which still stand today. The restaurant was located near 14th Street, an area close to Eighth Avenue that became known as "Little Spain".

José Perez and his son Joe Pérez, the newest owners of the restaurant, were interviewed by director Artur Balder in the 2010 documentary Little Spain, in order to shine a light on the memories of Little Spain and its most important landmarks, The band Amaranthe recorded part of the music video "That Song" in the restaurant.

In 1996, El Faro was honored with a Village Award by the Greenwich Village Society for Historic Preservation.

At the time of its demise in 2012 El Faro's was the oldest Spanish restaurant in New York City. Subsequently following El Faro's closure El Quijote in the Hotel Chelsea which opened in 1930 took its place as the oldest Spanish eatery in town.

== See also ==
- List of Spanish restaurants
