= Tigran Tsitoghdzyan =

Armenian-American painter

- Known for: Painting
- Notable work: Mirror, 2012, Oil on Canvas
- Website: ttigran.com

Tigran Tsitoghdzyan (Armenian: Տիգրան Ձիթողցյան) is an Armenian painter based in New York City.

== Career ==
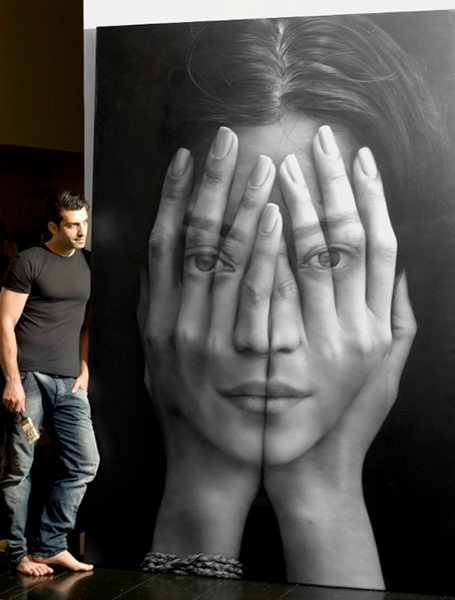
Tigran in his NYC studio, next to his first painting for his Mirror series.

Tigran had his first solo local and international exhibits by the age of 10. Some of his childhood paintings are in the Children’s Art Museum's collection in Yerevan, Armenia.

In 2012, the artist began a series titled Mirrors. On September 16, 2014 "Mirror V", one of Tigran's works from the "Mirrors" series, was sold at the Phillips Auction in New York, USA.

In 2018, the documentary American Mirror: Intimations of Immortality was released, directed by Arthur Balder. Tigran Tsitoghdzyan himself, as well as his paintings, were in the film.

In May 2021, Cube Art Fair, the World’s Largest Public Art Fair, featured Tigran Tsitoghdzyan's works in a billboard in Times Square as part of their initiative to highlight art that was conceived during the lockdown.

=== Exhibitions ===
Tigran's first solo exhibition was in 1986, at age 10. His works were exhibited at the Children's Art Museum, Yerevan, Armenia.

After departing from Armenia in the late 1990s, the first time Tigran returned for a solo exhibit as an adult to Yerevan, Armenia was in 2015. The show which took place at the Cafesjian Center for the Arts, exhibited six of the artist's 100 ″X 70″ Mirror paintings which included his Armenian Mirror — a portrait of an elderly Armenian woman hiding her face with her hands while grieving, which the artist painted to commemorate the 100th anniversary of the Armenian Genocide; They exhibited these along with several of his large-scale paintings from his other series titled Crowd.

In 2018, Tigran had his first solo exhibit in the city he's called home for over 12 years — New York City, the show, Tigran Tsitoghdzyan: Uncanny took place at Allouche Gallery, Downtown Manhattan and featured an array of the artists’ recent works.

In 2018, his works were shown at the Emmanuel Fremin Gallery, for his Tigran Tsi: Mirrors Reimagined exhibition. Later that same year, Tigran's works were included in the 25th anniversary of Opera Gallery’s Monaco Master’s show, a contemporary art show sponsored by Prince Albert II of Monaco.

In 2021, during Singapore Art Week, the Opera Gallery in Singapore exhibited an exclusive body of work created by the artist for this exhibit.
