= Church of Our Lady of Guadalupe (Manhattan) =

Catholic church in Manhattan, New York

- Iglesia Nuestra Señora de Guadalupe
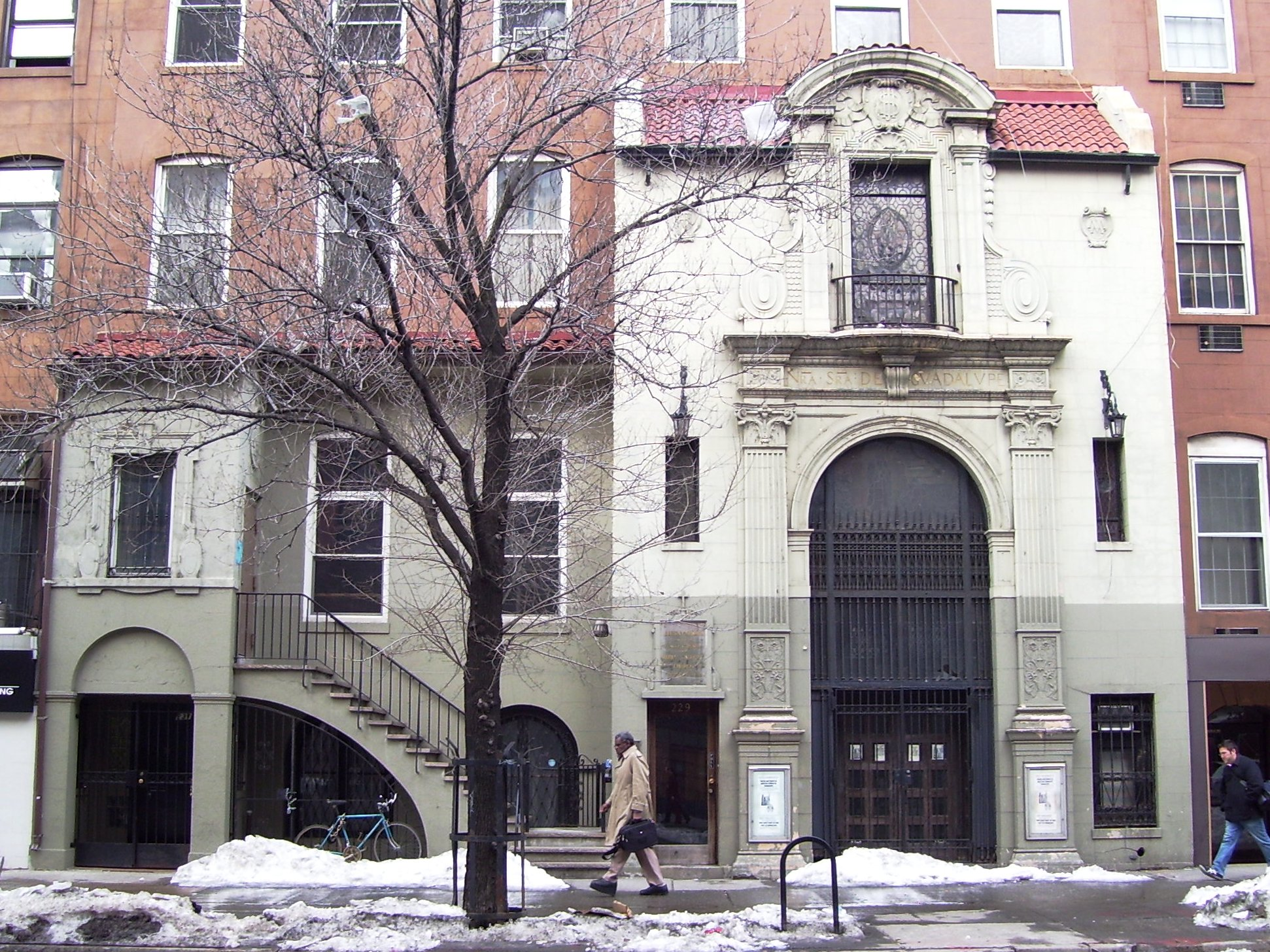
- Church of Our Lady of Guadalupe
- 40°44′21.4″N 74°00′03.3″W
- Location: 229 West 14th Street; Manhattan, New York City
- Country: United States
- Denomination: Roman Catholic Church

History
- Status: closed
- Founded: 1902
- Founder(s): The Rev. Stephen Chaboud, A.A.
- Dedication: Our Lady of Guadalupe

Architecture
- Architect: Gustave E. Steinback (1921 church facade)
- Architectural type: Townhouse
- Style: Spanish Baroque; Baroque Revival
- Years built: ca. 1850, converted to church 1902

The Church of Our Lady of Guadalupe (Spanish: Nuestra Señora de Guadalupe), is a former parish church under the authority of the Roman Catholic Archdiocese of New York, located at 229 West 14th Street, between Seventh and Eighth Avenues, in the Chelsea section of Manhattan in New York City.

With the merger in 2003 of the Parish of Our Lady of Guadalupe with the Parish of St. Bernard, farther west at 328 West 14th Street, the function was transferred to the nearby St. Bernard Church and the church was converted to other uses.

== History ==
The parish was established in 1902 by the Augustinians of the Assumption as the first Spanish-speaking Catholic parish in New York City, serving working-class Spaniards. At the time, that area of 14th street was considered “Little Spain”. The parish was merged in 2003 with the neighboring St. Bernard Parish to create the Parish of Our Lady of Guadalupe & St. Bernard.

== Building ==
The church building is a former mid-19th-century brownstone rowhouse. Its conversion to a church created a double-story sanctuary. The church also included a "side chapel, tiny balcony, and clerestory." The monumental facade completed in the Spanish Baroque style or "classically proportioned Spanish Revival façade" was built in 1921 to the designs of Gustave Steinback. The "transformation which makes Guadalupe extremely rare, if not unique, in the city spanned two decades and involved several notable architects...." The AIA Guide to NYC (Fifth Edition, 2010) called it "an extraordinary brownstone conversion.... Its Iberian ancestry is expressed both in the language of its services and in its Spanish Colonial facade."

The church remained popular with the various Hispanic communities of New York, serving Spaniards, Spanish-Americans, Puerto Ricans, Mexicans and other Latin Americans. The rapid expansion of the Mexican population in the late 20th century, however, overwhelmed the small church, necessitating the congregation's transfer to nearby St. Bernard Church.
