= Spanish Benevolent Society =

Organization in New York City

La Nacional is a cultural institution founded by Spaniards to serve the Spanish community in the New York area. The Society is the oldest Spanish cultural Institution in the United States. The organization has EIN 13-5540230 as a 501(c)(4) Civic Leagues and Social Welfare Organizations entity; in 2024 it claimed $446,315 in total revenue and $216,291 in total assets.

== History ==
Many prominent Spanish artists, expatriates, immigrants, and personalities have lived at the society as resident artists during the more than 150 years of its existence, like Picasso, Dalí, Buñuel, or Federico García Lorca. In 2010 Spanish American filmmaker and writer Artur Balder, who lived in the building as resident artist for more than one year, created the documentary Little Spain, displaying for first time the untold history of this society. The archive contains more than 450 photographs and 150 documents that have never been publicly displayed. They present the history of the streets of Little Spain in New York City throughout the 20th Century.

== Mission ==
Since its founding in 1868 the primary objective of the Centro Español – Spanish Benevolent Society is to "promote, encourage and spread the spirit of fraternity and solidarity among Spanish and Hispanic-American residents of this country.”

In those early years, the Society served as an essential support system for Spaniards immigrating to the United States – providing food and shelter; tending to their health care needs; arranging afterlife services; and acting as their de facto home away from home in New York.

The Spanish Benevolent Society is an American not-for-profit, 501(c)(3) tax-exempt, charitable organization. The Society and building on 14th street are member-owned and receives our support from membership and corporate partnerships.

== See also ==
- List of American gentlemen's clubs
