= Little Spain, Manhattan =

Neighborhood in New York City

Coordinates: 40°44′21″N 74°0′4″W

- Interactive map of Little Spain, Manhattan

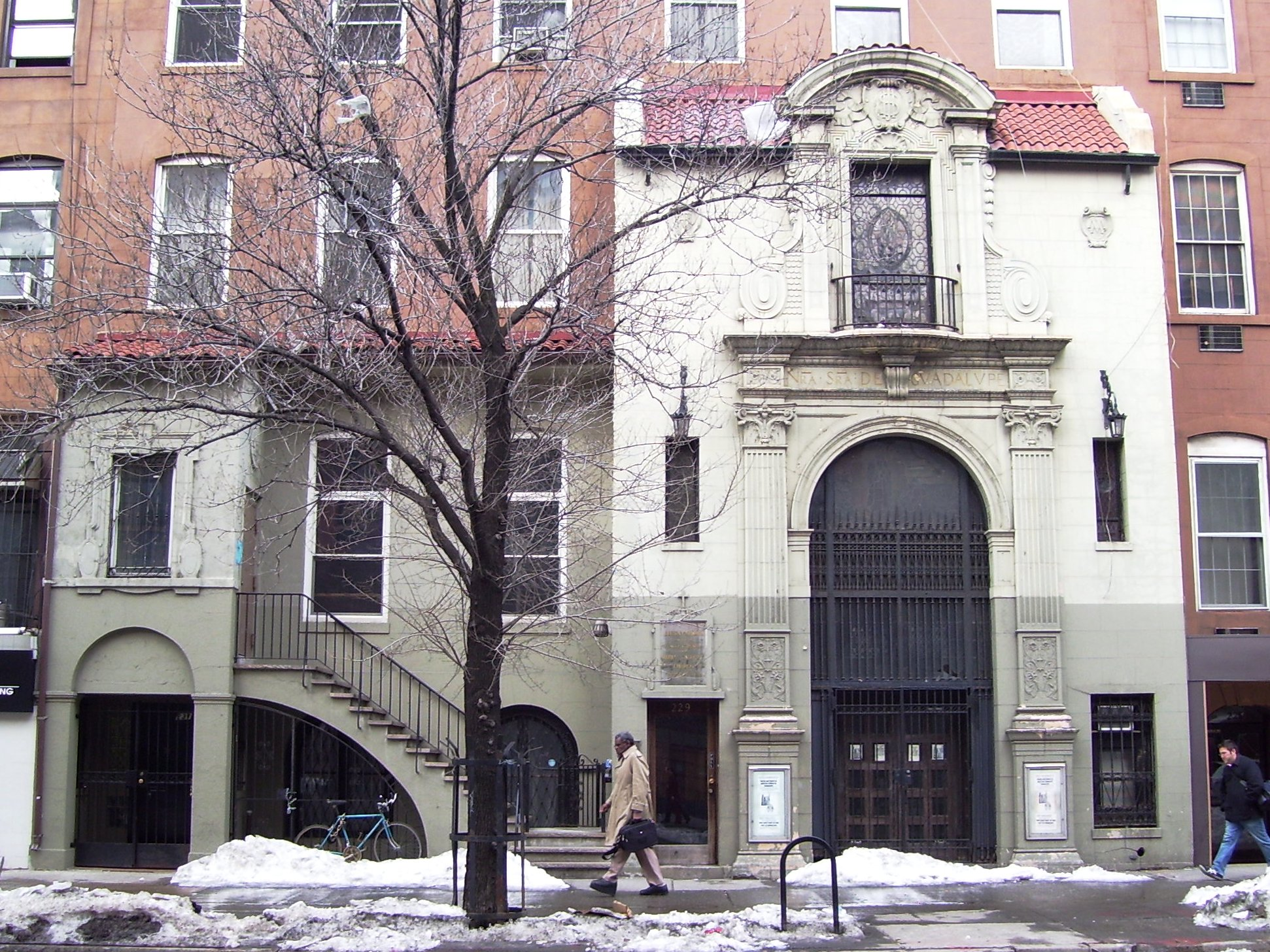
The Church of Our Lady of Guadalupe in Little Spain on 14th Street in Manhattan, an important nucleus for many decades for the Spanish community in New York City

Little Spain (Spanish: Pequeña España) was a neighborhood in the New York City borough of Manhattan, during the 20th century where Spaniards originally settled in upon emigrating to the United States. It was situated between the neighborhoods of Chelsea and Greenwich Village.

== History ==
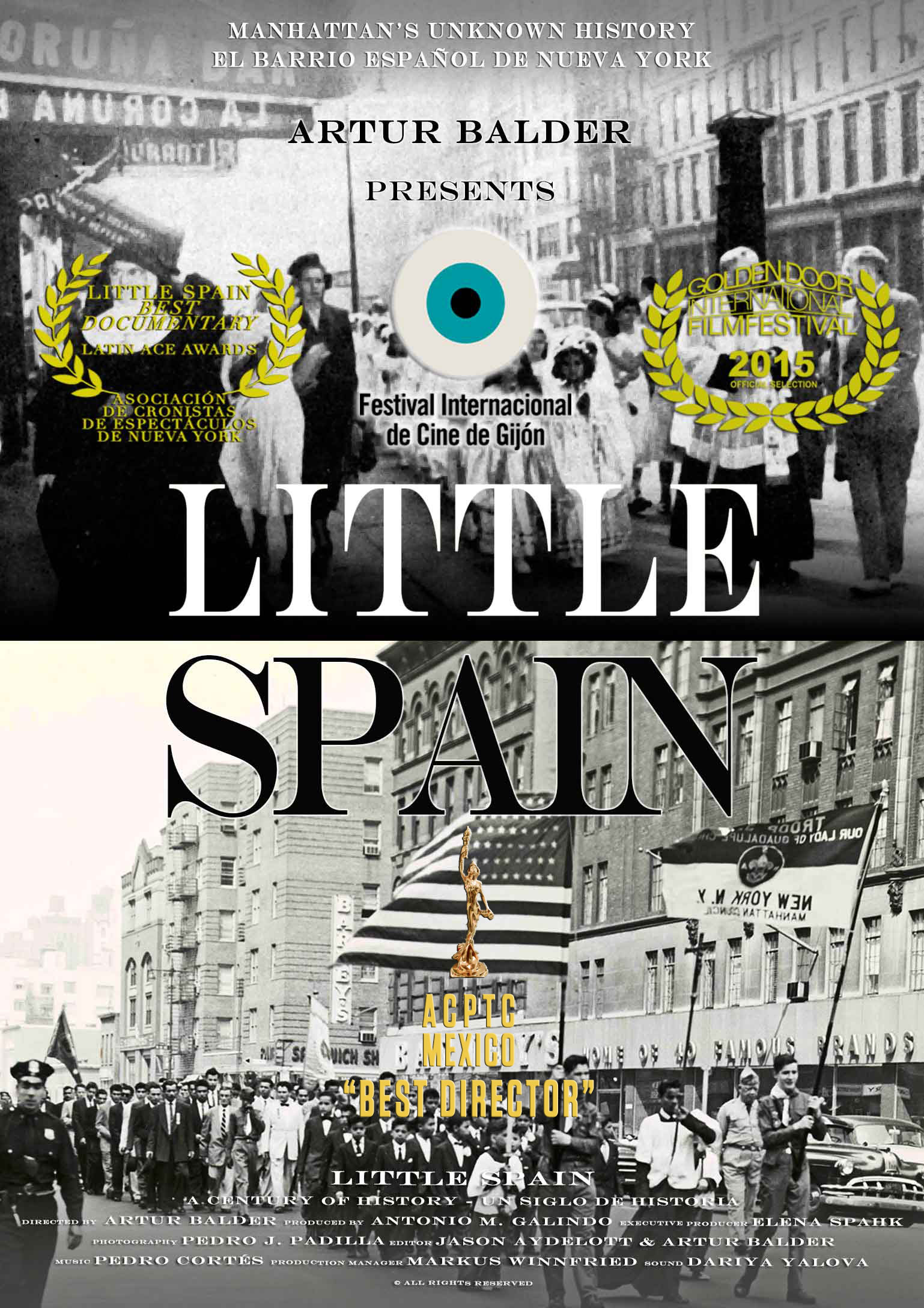
Poster for Little Spain (2010), a documentary exploring the history of New York City's Little Spain neighborhood.

"Little Spain" was situated on 14th Street, between Seventh and Eighth Avenues. A very different section of Chelsea existed on a stretch of 14th Street often referred to by residents as Calle Catorce ("Street Fourteen") or as "Little Spain". The Church of Our Lady of Guadalupe (No. 229) was founded in 1902, when Spaniards started to settle in the area. Although the Spanish business have given way to such nightclubs as Nell's and Oh Johnny on the block between Seventh and Eighth Avenues, the Spanish food and gift emporium known as Casa Moneo has been at 210 West 14th since 1929. In 2010 the documentary Little Spain, directed and written by Artur Balder, was filmed in New York City. The documentary pulled together for first time an archive that reveals the untold history of the Spanish-American presence in Manhattan. They present the history of the streets of Little Spain in New York City throughout the 20th Century. The archive contains more than 450 photographs and 150 documents that have never been publicly displayed.

Other important commerces and Spanish business of Little Spain were restaurants like La Bilbaína, Trocadero Valencia, Bar Coruña, Little Spain Bar, Café Madrid, Mesón Flamenco, or El Faro Restaurant. The Iberia was a famous Spanish dress shop.

The heart of the Spanish American community in that area were the two landmarks: the Spanish Benevolent Society and the Roman Catholic Church of Our Lady of Guadalupe, founded at the turn of the 19th century, being the first parish in Manhattan with mass in Latin and Spanish. Just like with other immigrant neighborhoods of Manhattan, such as Little Italy, Little Spain celebrated a feast day; that of St. James. It was held in June, and was held until the mid-1990s. During this festival, the saint's image was the symbol of the feeling of the Spanish community and paraded down the street 14, which was cut to traffic for a week. In this time, food festivals were taking place shows of typical Spanish folklore.

Virginia Admiral and her son, Robert De Niro, moved to a top floor studio at the 219 West 14th Street, owned by the Galician entrepreneur José García. According to investigations, De Niro was living during the 1950s at the heart of Little Spain after the divorce of his parents.

In 2026, the intersection of Eighth Avenue and 14th Street was named "Little Spain–La Nacional Way" in honor of Little Spain.
