= Artur Balder =

American artist, filmmaker (born 1984)

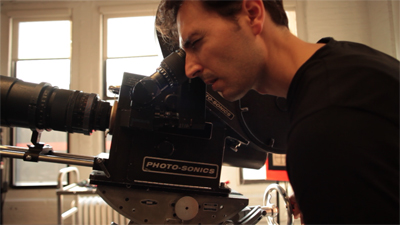
- Balder in 2010.
- Born: August 14, 1984 (age 42); Valencia, Spain
- Occupations: Sculptor, painter, film director, writer

Artur Balder (born August 14, 1984) is an American multidisciplinary artist, mostly known as sculptor, painter, filmmaker and writer.

His sculptures have been auctioned in the United States. In 2026, Rago Arts noted a record for the artist with the artwork Head (Gatekeeper No. 6).

He directed the documentary Little Spain in 2011 about the Little Spain ethnic neighborhood in Manhattan, New York.

In 2018, he directed and produced the documentary American Mirror with Susan Sarandon and Armenian painter Tigran Tsitoghdzyan.

His trilogy of books, known as the Teutoburg Saga, is a historical fiction series about German chieftain Arminius.

== Filmography ==
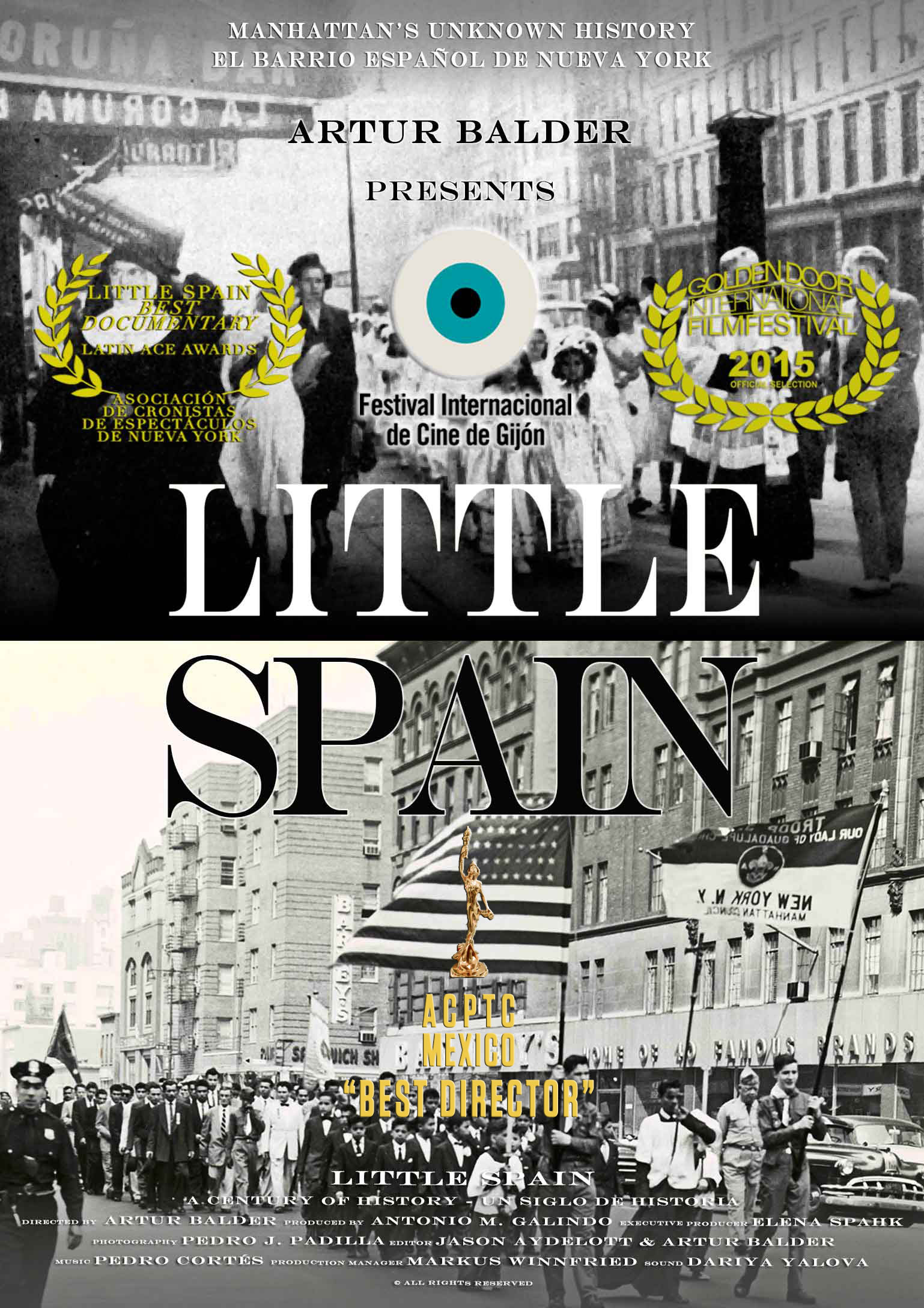
Poster for Little Spain (2011), a documentary exploring the history of New York City's Little Spain neighborhood.

- Little Spain (2011)
- Ciria, Pronounced Thiria (2013)
- American Mirror: Intimations of Immortality (2018)

== Bibliography ==
=== Teutoburg Saga ===
- El Último Querusco (2005)
- Liberator Germaniae (2006)
- La Batalla del Destino (2007)

=== Curdy Trilogy ===
- Curdy and the Scepter of Carlomagno
- Curdy, el Vampiro de Gothland
- Curdy y la Cámara de los Lores
