= La Unión Martí-Maceo =

Historic social club in Florida, US

Coordinates: 27°57′37.5″N 82°26′45.5″W

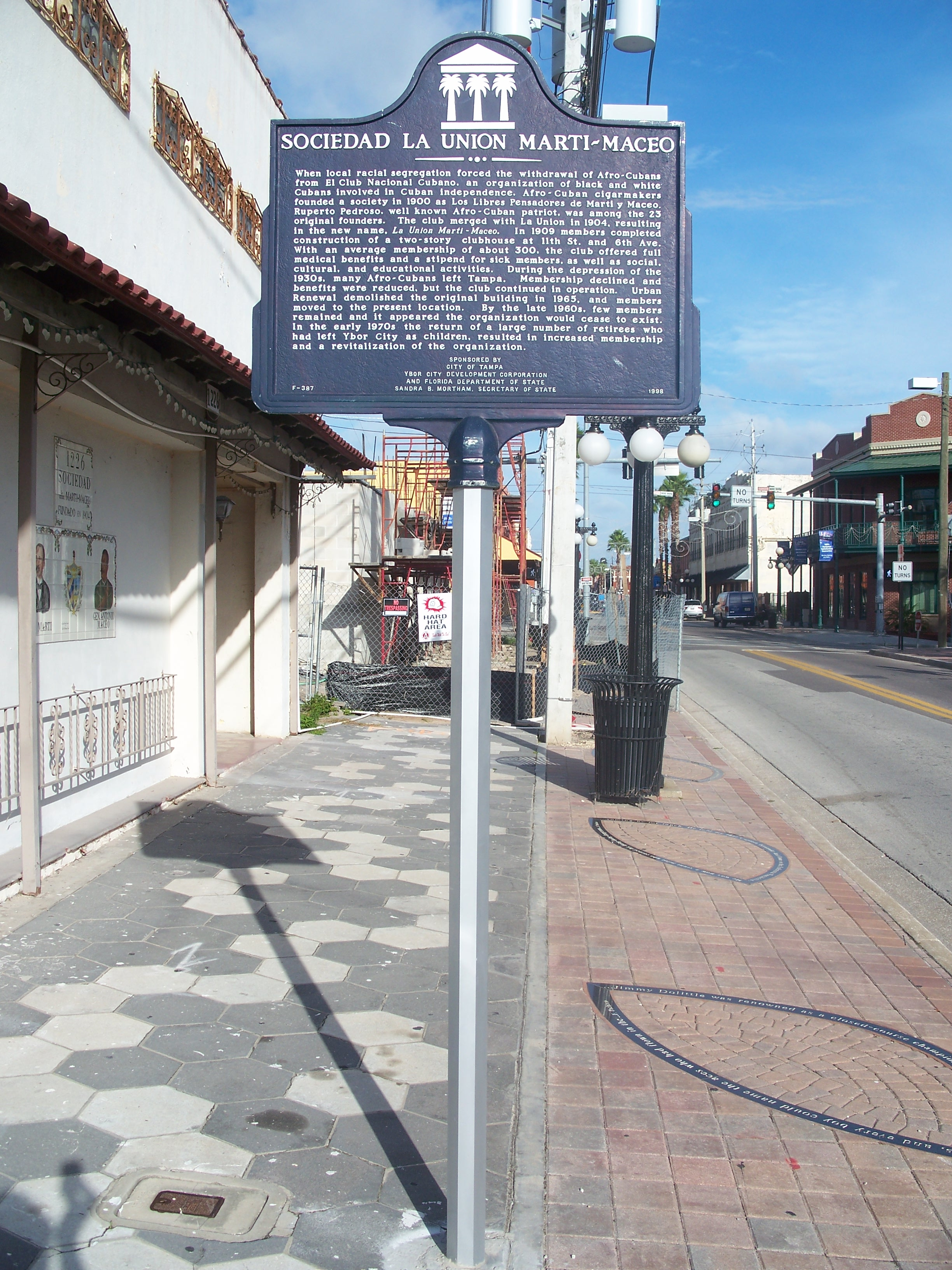
Historical marker in front of the building

La Unión Martí-Maceo (also known as the Martí-Maceo Society) is a historic social club in Ybor City, Florida, established by Afro-Cubans. It was founded in 1900. It is a site on the Florida Black Heritage Trail and Tampa's Soulwalk. It is at 1226 East 7th Avenue. The ornate clubhouse was demolished during an urban renewal redevelopment program in the 1960s, and its headquarters was proposed for sale to address financial difficulties in 2018.

The scholar Susan D. Greenbaum described the club as "the focal institution around which, and inside of which, the Afro-Cuban identity emerged in Tampa."

== Background ==
Benefit societies, or sociedades, were commonly organized by Spanish immigrants to Cuba in the later decades of the 1800s. As Cubans immigrated to Florida, notably Ybor City, they founded similar societies to collectively provide medical care. Other immigrant groups to the city also founded ethnic societies. The first such group to be founded in Ybor City was El Centro Español de Tampa, in 1891. Its membership primarily consisted of Galician and Asturian cigarmakers. After El Centro Español, other clubs founded included the Italian L'Unione Italiana (1894), the Centro Asturiano, and the Cuban El Club Nacional Cubano (1899).

== History ==
The society was named after José Martí and Antonio Maceo Grajales, leaders in the Cuban War of Independence.

=== Formation ===
While El Club Nacional Cubano initially allowed members of any race, in late 1900 the club decided to exclude Black Cubans. Sarah McNamara writes that "Anglo political powerholders" forced this change. Many in Florida politics were bothered by the fluid and peaceful race-relations in Ybor City so the Florida state government pressured the city to enforce the Jim Crow laws. On October 26, 1900, twenty-four Afro-Cubans who were members of the club announced the formation of another organization, Los Libres Pensadores de Martí y Maceo.

Los Libres Pensadores de Martí y Maceo was founded as a benefit society, which primarily served its members by subsidizing the cost of medical treatment. Membership was initially restricted to Afro-Cubans, but Puerto Ricans also joined. The club also paid members $1.50 for every day they could not work due to sickness. Dues initially were 60 cents per week. Because there were no hospitals in Tampa at the beginning of the 20th century that would treat Black people (and after 1908, there was only Clara C. Frye's), the society sent ill members to Cuban hospitals, where they paid for treatment and a return trip.

The club also ran a school aimed at preserving Black Cuban heritage. It offered night classes to community members on the Spanish language and Cuban history. The club itself required that Spanish be spoken in its building in an effort to preserve their culture, but encouraged members to learn English. Greenbaum conducted a study of the club finances which concluded that, on average, officers of the club received worse benefits in proportion to the funds they put into the club than members.

=== Early history (1900-1945) ===
The club was inaugurated with a dance in October 1900. In 1904, Los Libres Pensadores de Martí y Maceo merged with La Unión, another Black sociedad, forming the combined group La Unión Martí-Maceo.

In 1908, the society built a hall for events, which was at the time the largest facility Black people could use in Tampa. Greenbaum attributes their ability to erect such a prominent building to the fact that while the society represented only a small portion of Blacks in Tampa, Afro-Cubans were paid higher wages on average than African-Americans, and their population was concentrated in one society, rather than divided between many. The building's two floors held a dance hall, various rooms for meetings, and a theater with a capacity of 900. The Centennial History of Ybor City wrote that this hall “sponsored virtually every social and cultural event celebrated” by the community it served. The club also had a baseball team, Los Gigantes Cubanos (The Cuban Giants), which competed against other Latin clubs in the area.

The society began admitting African-Americans in 1915, with the requirement that they speak Spanish.

=== Later history (1945-present) ===
From 1948 to 1956, the Martí-Maceo society received substantial funding from Fulgencio Batista personally, as well as the government of Cuba. These funds allowed the organization to work on preserving and maintaining historic buildings, such as the boarding house of Paulina Pedroso. In 1955, the club denied a request by Fidel Castro to speak in their hall, saying it was not permitted in their bylaws to allow political speeches.

The original clubhouse building was demolished in 1965 as part of an Urban Renewal redevelopment program. The organization then moved to a new building on East 7th Avenue and 14th Street near José Martí Park. The Florida House of Representatives passed a bill, which was then signed into law, in 1989 which recognized the Unión for its work. Reflecting the government's role in the clubhouse's destruction, the bill requested that Tampa and Ybor City "take any and all steps necessary to preserve the headquarters of La Unión Martí-Maceo and protect it from the consequences of the urban renewal process" In 1997, a historic marker was placed outside the hall by the Tampa/Hillsborough County Preservation Board. The headquarters was proposed for sale to address financial difficulties in 2018, but this did not go through.

== Bibliography ==
- Greenbaum, Susan D. (2002). "Sociedad la Unión Martí-Maceo". More Than Black: Afro-Cubans in Tampa. University Press of Florida. pp. 148–177. ISBN 0-8130-2466-8.
- Greenbaum, Susan D. (2010). "Afro-Cubans in Tampa". The Afro-Latin@ reader : history and culture in the United States. Duke University Press. ISBN 978-0-8223-4558-9 – via Archive.org.
- Hewitt, Nancy A. (2001). Southern Discomfort: Women's Activism in Tampa, Florida, 1880s-1920s. University of Illinois Press. ISBN 978-0-252-02682-9.
- Lastra, Frank Trebín. (2006). Ybor City: The Making of a Landmark Town. The University of Tampa Press.
- McNamara, Sarah (2023). Ybor City: Crucible of the Latina South. The University of North Carolina Press – via Project MUSE.
- Mormino, Gary R. and George E. Pozzetta (1985). "The Cradle of Mutual Aid: Immigrant Cooperative Societies in Ybor City." Tampa Bay History 7 (2): 1-23.
- A Centennial History of Ybor City. Department of History, College of Social and Behavioral Sciences, University of South Florida. 1985.
