= LeClaire Apartments =

- U.S. National Register of Historic Places
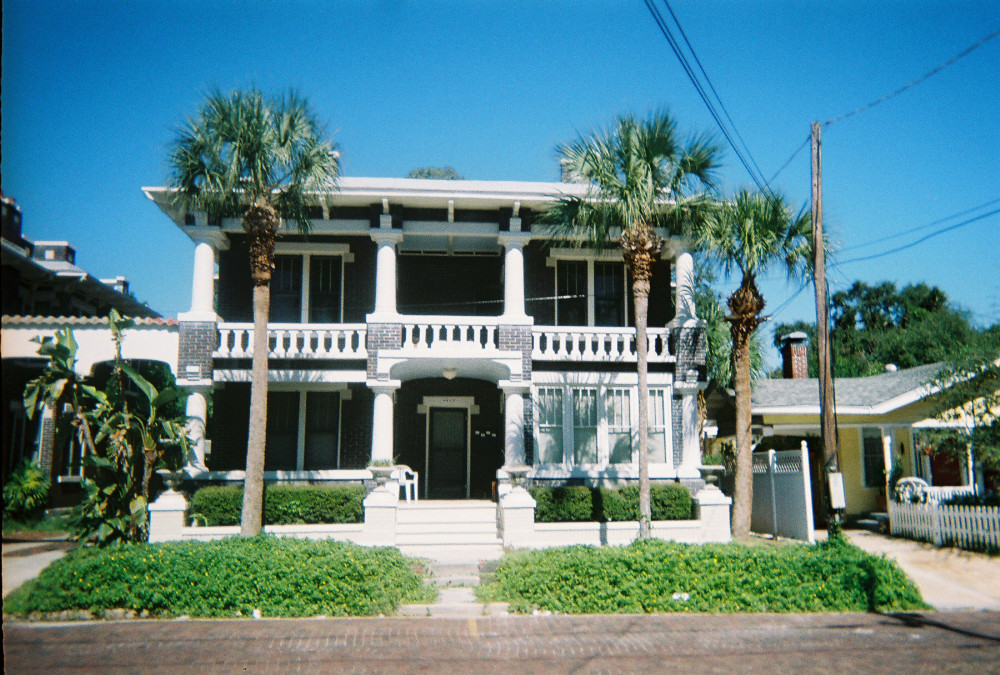
- Eastern side of the LeClaire apartments

- Location within Florida Location within the United States
- Location: 3013-3015 San Carlos, Tampa, Florida
- Coordinates: 27°55′22″N 82°29′37″W
- Area: less than one acre
- Built: 1926
- Architect: Fred J. James
- Architectural style: Bungalow/Craftsman
- NRHP reference No.: 88001697
- Added to NRHP: November 16, 1988

The LeClaire Apartments is a historic apartment building in Tampa, Florida, United States. It is located at 3013 through 3015 San Carlos Street. It was designed by Tampa architect Fred J. James. On November 16, 1988, it was added to the U.S. National Register of Historic Places.

== See also ==
- El Centro Español of West Tampa
- Old Tampa Free Public Library

== References and external links ==
- Hillsborough County listings at National Register of Historic Places
- Hillsborough County listings at Florida's Office of Cultural and Historical Programs

== Gallery ==
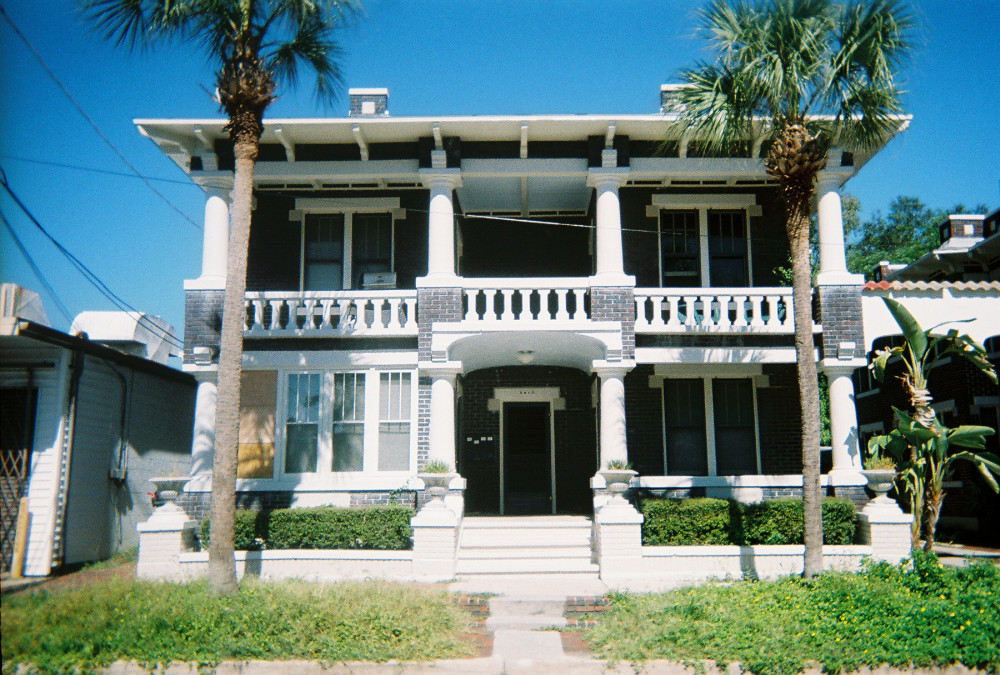
Western side of the LeClaire apartments
