= El Centro Español =

El Centro Español may refer to:

- El Centro Español de Tampa
- El Centro Español of West Tampa
