= Fred J. James =

Canadian-born American architect

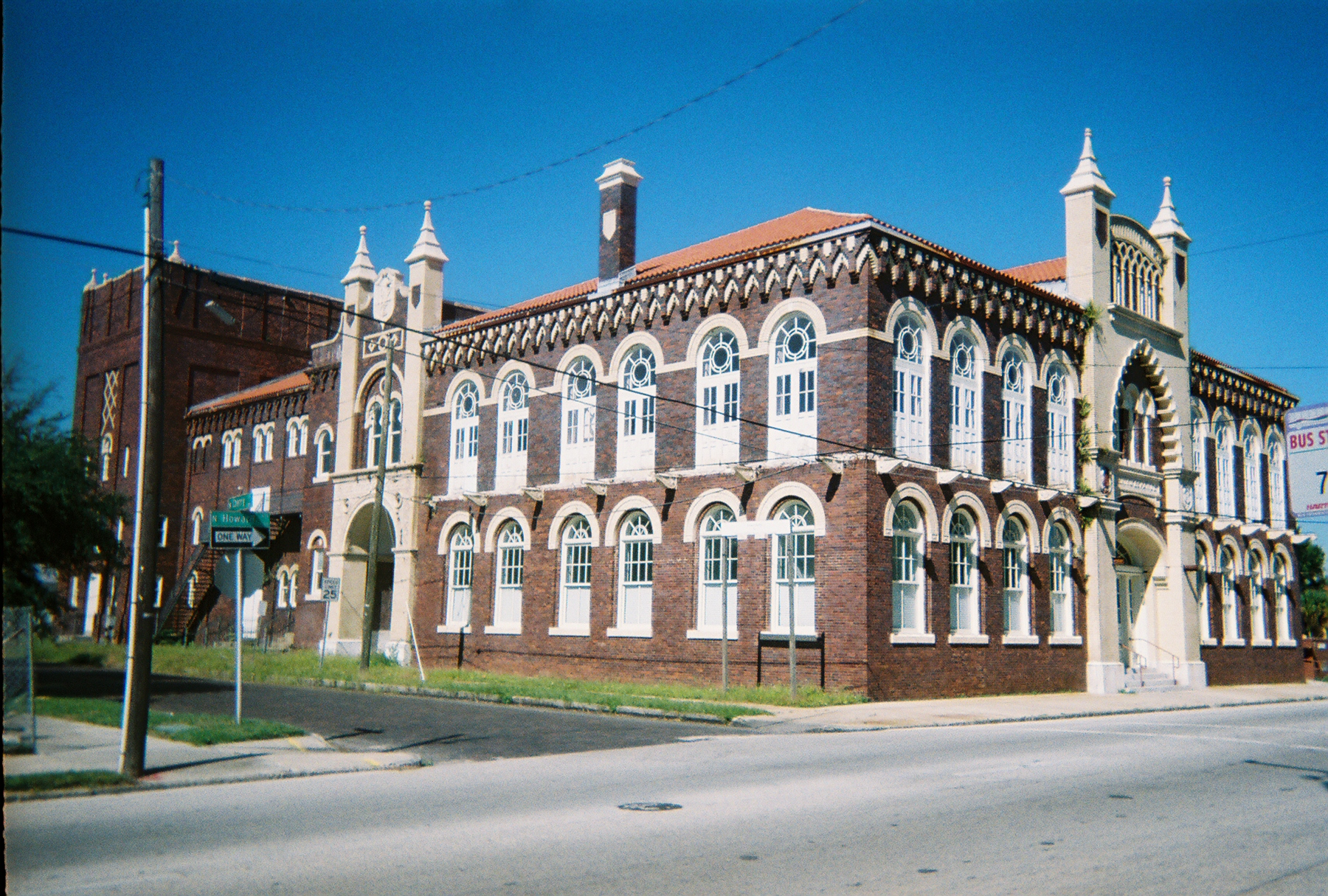
El Centro Español of West Tampa

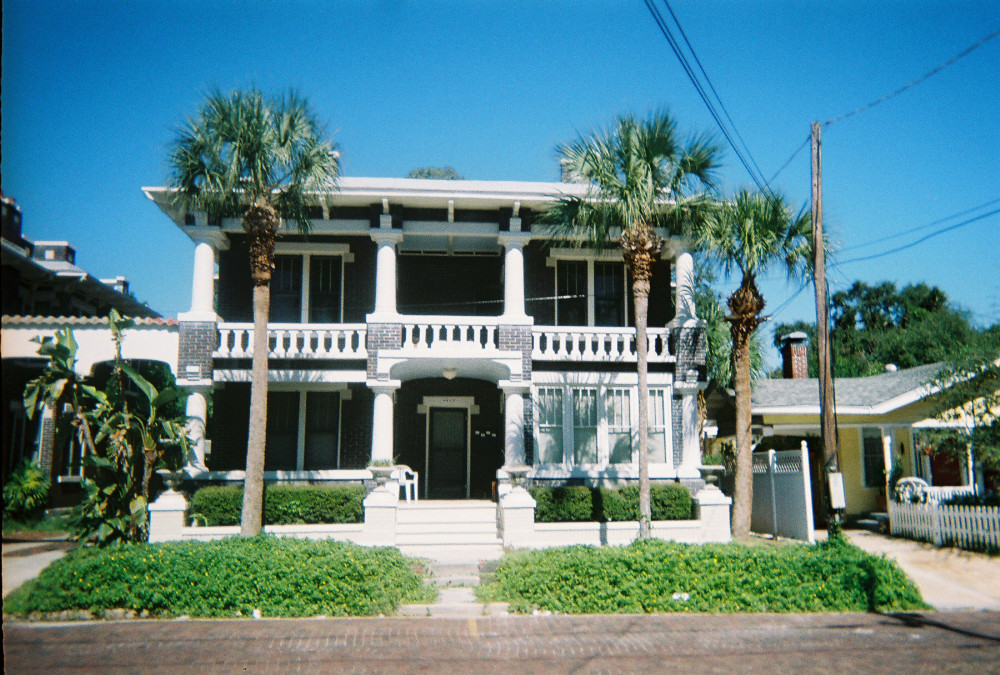
LeClaire Apartments

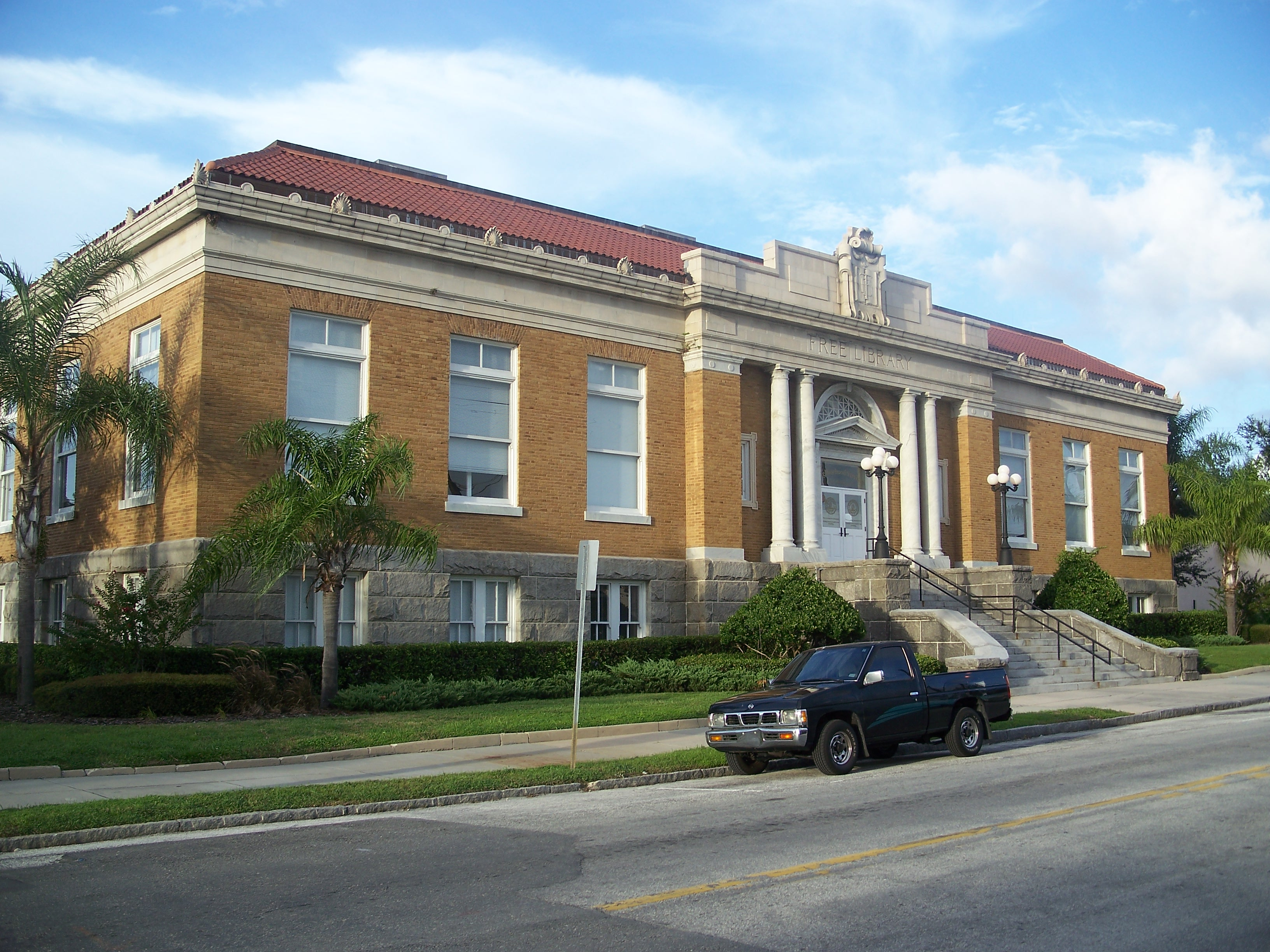
Tampa Free Library

Fred J. James was an American architect born in Canada. He came to Florida some time around 1885. He had an office in the Citizens Bank Building in Tampa, Florida. He designed El Centro Español of West Tampa.

James designed a Carnegie Library, the Tampa Free Library, constructed in 1915-17, that was Tampa's main library until 1968. It includes a T-plan, masonry, brown and yellow brick atop a rusticated granite basement, and is topped by a barrel tile roof. It has been known as the Old Tampa Free Public Library, the Exceptional Children Education Center is now being used for Tampa's Business and Community Services Department. It was added to the National Register of Historic Places in 1991.

James designed the R.O. Richards building (1923), also known as the Pythian Building, in Fort Myers, Florida in 1923 at 1615 Hendry Street for R. O. Richards, President of the state pharmacy board and a key figure in getting Connie Mack and the Philadelphia Athletics to come to Fort Myers in 1924. It housed the Royal Palm Pharmacy.

James was also involved in the design of the Thom McAn (1927) on Franklin Street in Tampa.

He designed the 2-story LeClaire Apartments (1926) at 3013-3015 San Carlos in a Masonry Vernacular style. The building has two mirror-image wings connected by a passage on the second floor and includes a stucco-covered arcade. It was listed on the National Register of Historic Places in 1988.
