= Paulina Pedroso =

Cuban revolutionary

Paulina Pedroso (1845 – 1925) was the most prominent female leader in the Cuban War of Independence. She worked directly with José Martí.

== Life ==
Pedroso's parents were born slaves, but she was born free in Pinar del Río in 1845. Her parents were active in seeking Cuban independence. She married at a very young age, and Pedroso is her married surname. In 1860, she moved with her husband Ruberto to Havana. She was fifteen at the time. In 1892, she moved to Ybor City with her husband. Afterward, they went to Key West, Florida. She and her husband worked in the cigar industry in Tampa, Florida, and also ran a boarding house. Jose Marti often stayed in her boarding house in Tampa, and it was a place where they could openly discuss their plans for the war effort. Marti referred to Pedroso as his second mother. Pedroso died in 1925, when she was eighty. Her home in Ybor City became a shrine, and her home in Tampa is now a park.

== Activism ==
Pedroso was heavily involved in activism. She aided other black Cubans in forming La Sociedad Libres, along with her husband. The group was formed to arm rebels against the Spanish government for the liberation of Cuba. This organization eventually became the Sociedad La Union Marti-Maceo.

Pedroso also worked for racial equality in North America, and she collaborated with Marti on this matter. The two famously strolled arm-in-arm in the city, during a time of extreme racial tension. Pedroso was Afro-Cuban, and Marti was White-Hispanic. After Cuban independence was won in 1898, she eventually returned to Cuba when a 1910 workers' strike in the tobacco factories was underway. The Cuban government honored her service during that time, and in appreciation, Pedroso and her husband lived rent-free in Cuba for the rest of their lives. She was inducted into the Florida Women's Hall of Fame by Governor Lawton Chiles in 1993, and on her first nomination, which is something that is not achieved often.
