= El Centro Español of West Tampa =

- U.S. National Register of Historic Places
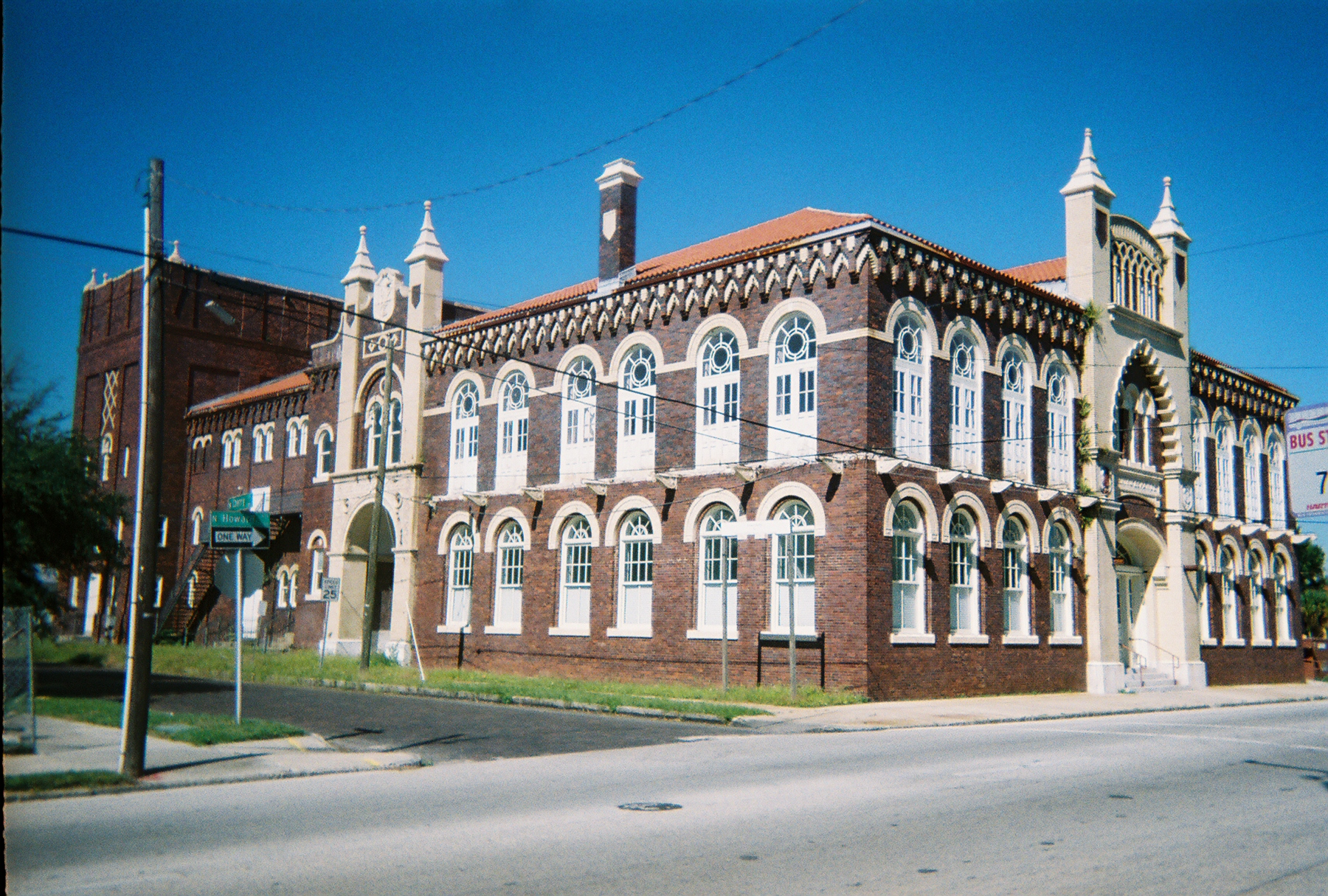
- Location: West Tampa, Tampa, Florida
- Coordinates: 27.9618°N 82.483°W
- Built: 1912
- Architect: Fred J. James
- Architectural style: Mediterranean Revival with Moorish details
- NRHP reference No.: 74000632
- Added to NRHP: July 30, 1974

El Centro Español of West Tampa is a historic site in the West Tampa neighborhood of Tampa, Florida, United States. It is located at 2306 North Howard Avenue (Tampa). It was designed by Fred J. James. On July 30, 1974, it was added to the U.S. National Register of Historic Places.

The Centro of West Tampa was a branch of El Centro Español de Tampa of Ybor City, and was built using membership dues of cigar workers in Ybor City and West Tampa. Members could use either building for amenities such as a gym, casino (game room), cafe, and health clinic. Centro Español de West Tampa also included the Royal Theater where live stage shows were performed; later movies were shown in the Royal Theater.

The building was empty for years, and private attempts at restoration have been unsuccessful due to the high costs involved. However, the city of Tampa restored Centro and used it as a temporary home for the Tampa Museum of Art while a new museum building was built downtown.

Another chapter opened for El Centro Español of West Tampa with the execution of a 10-year lease between the City of Tampa and the Hillsborough Education Foundation in January 2010. The Hillsborough Education Foundation is a non-profit which has been garnering private resources to support public education since 1988. In 2007 the Foundation added Teaching Tools for Hillsborough Schools to its roster of programs. This is a resource store where teachers from Hillsborough schools with the greatest need may obtain free supplies for their students and classrooms. The store had been operated out of rented space and was in need of a permanent home. With the lease of Centro, now all Foundation programs and staff are housed in this historic building. Renovations continue, but as of June 14, 2010 the Foundation moved its programs into the building.

== See also ==
- History of West Tampa
- The Mutual Aid Societies of Tampa
- El Centro Español de Tampa
- Centro Asturiano de Tampa
- Circulo Cubano de Tampa
- Spanish American

== Gallery ==
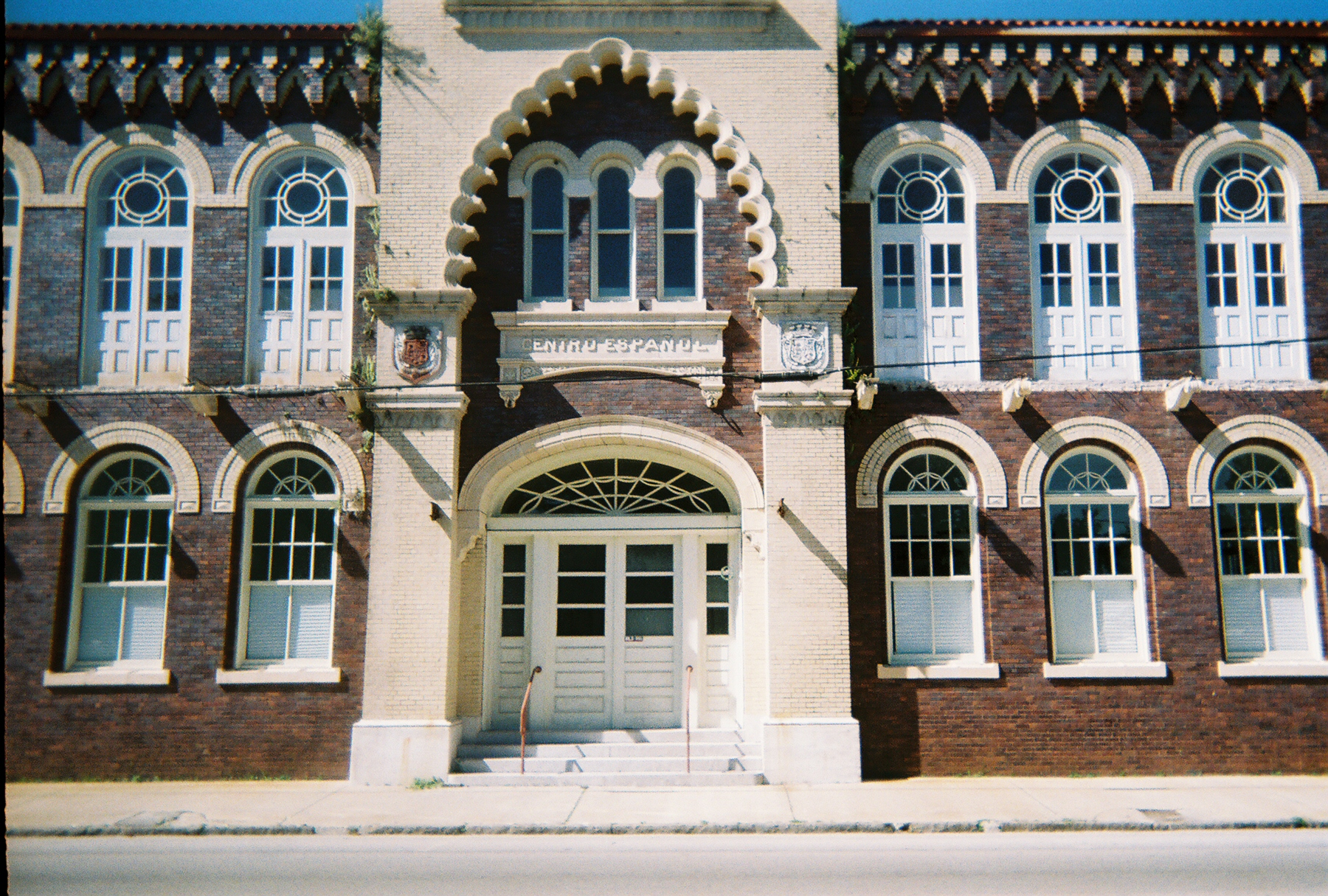

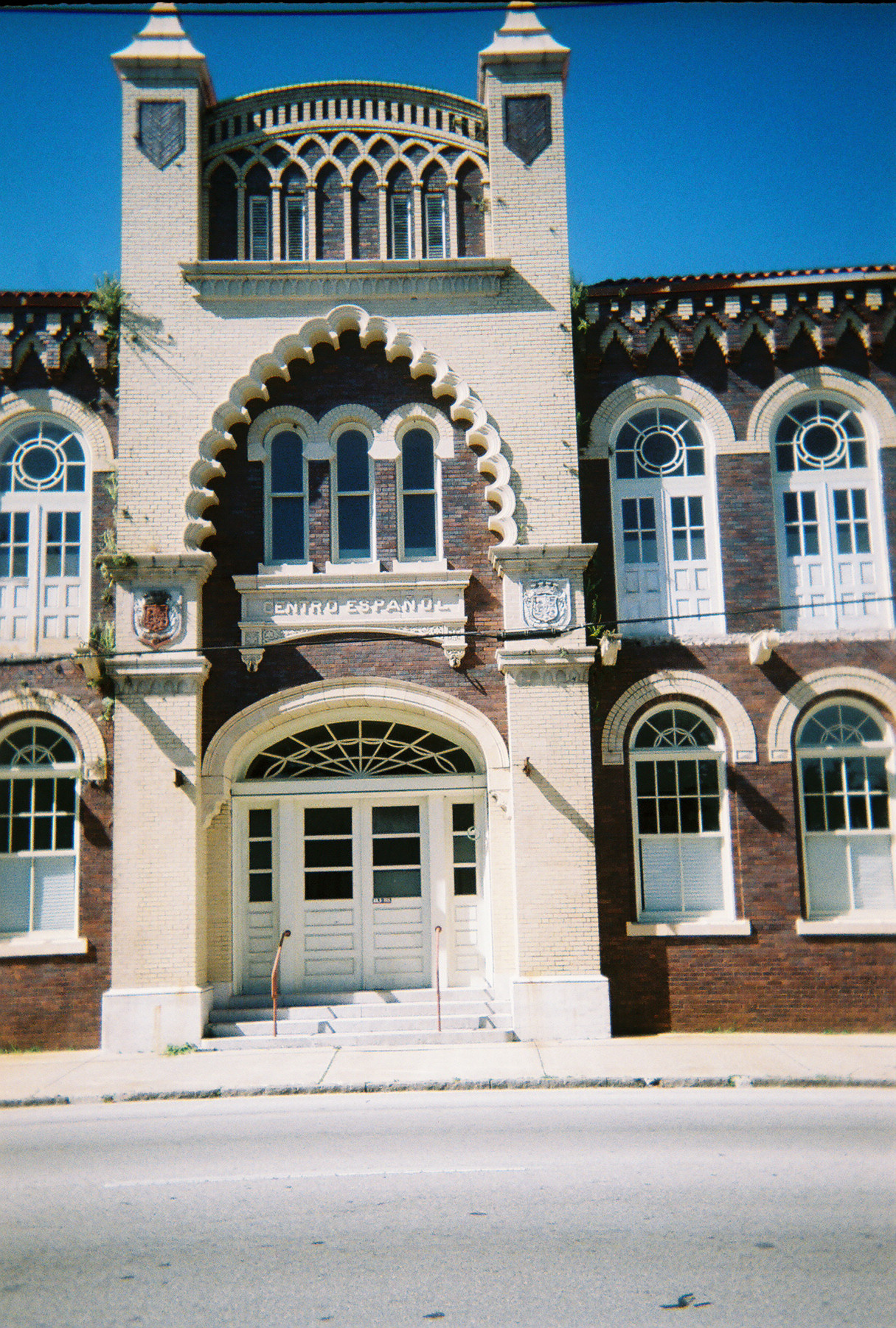
