= El Centro Español de Tampa =

- U.S. National Register of Historic Places
- U.S. National Historic Landmark
- U.S. National Historic Landmark District – Contributing property
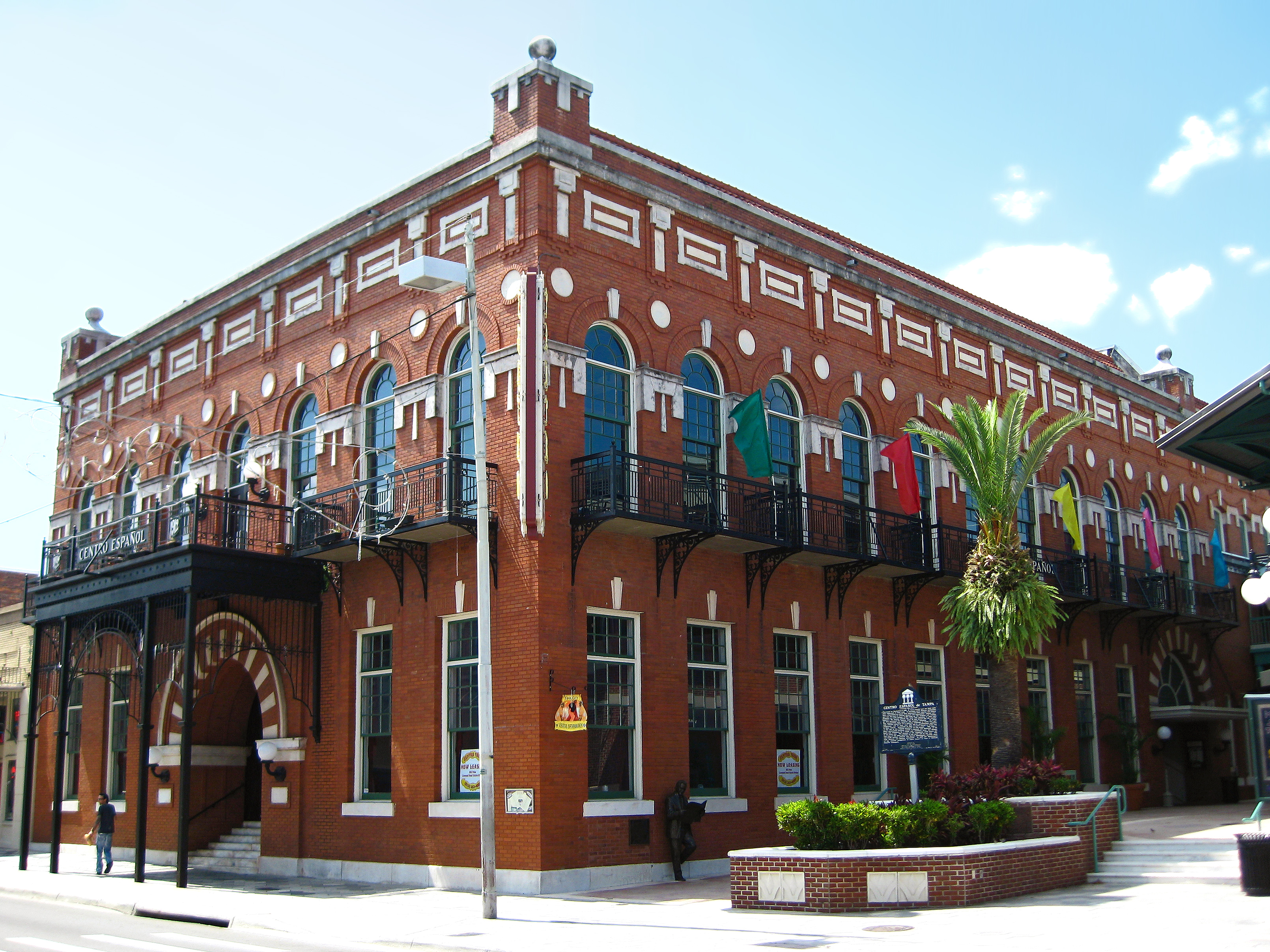
- El Centro Español de Tampa, 7th Avenue, Ybor City.

- Location within Florida Location within the United States
- Location: 1526–1536 East 7th Avenue; Tampa, Florida, US
- Coordinates: 27°57′36.91″N 82°26′32.22″W
- Area: 1 acre (0.40 ha)
- Built: 1912
- Architect: Francis J. Kennard
- Architectural style: French Renaissance Revival with Moorish and Spanish influences
- Part of: Ybor City Historic; District (ID74000641)
- NRHP reference No.: 88001823

Significant dates
- Added to NRHP: June 3, 1988
- Designated NHL: June 3, 1988
- Designated NHLDCP: December 4, 1990

El Centro Español de Tampa is a historic building in the Ybor City neighborhood of Tampa, in the U.S. state of Florida. Built as an ethnic and cultural clubhouse in 1912, the red brick structure situated at 1526–1536 East 7th Avenue is today part of a shopping and entertainment complex. It remains one of the few surviving structures specific to Spanish immigration to the United States during the late 19th and early 20th centuries, a legacy which garnered the Centro Español building recognition as a U.S. National Historic Landmark (NHL) on June 3, 1988. El Centro Español de Tampa is one of two individual structures within Hillsborough County to be so designated.

The historic and cultural significance of El Centro Español de Tampa was noted well before the announcement of its NHL status. As early as 1974, the building was included by the National Register of Historic Places as one of the Contributing Properties within the Ybor City Historic District. The building remains an important component of the district, which on December 4, 1990, gained more distinct recognition as a National Historic Landmark District. It is now home to Jason Fernandez's restaurant Carne.

== History ==
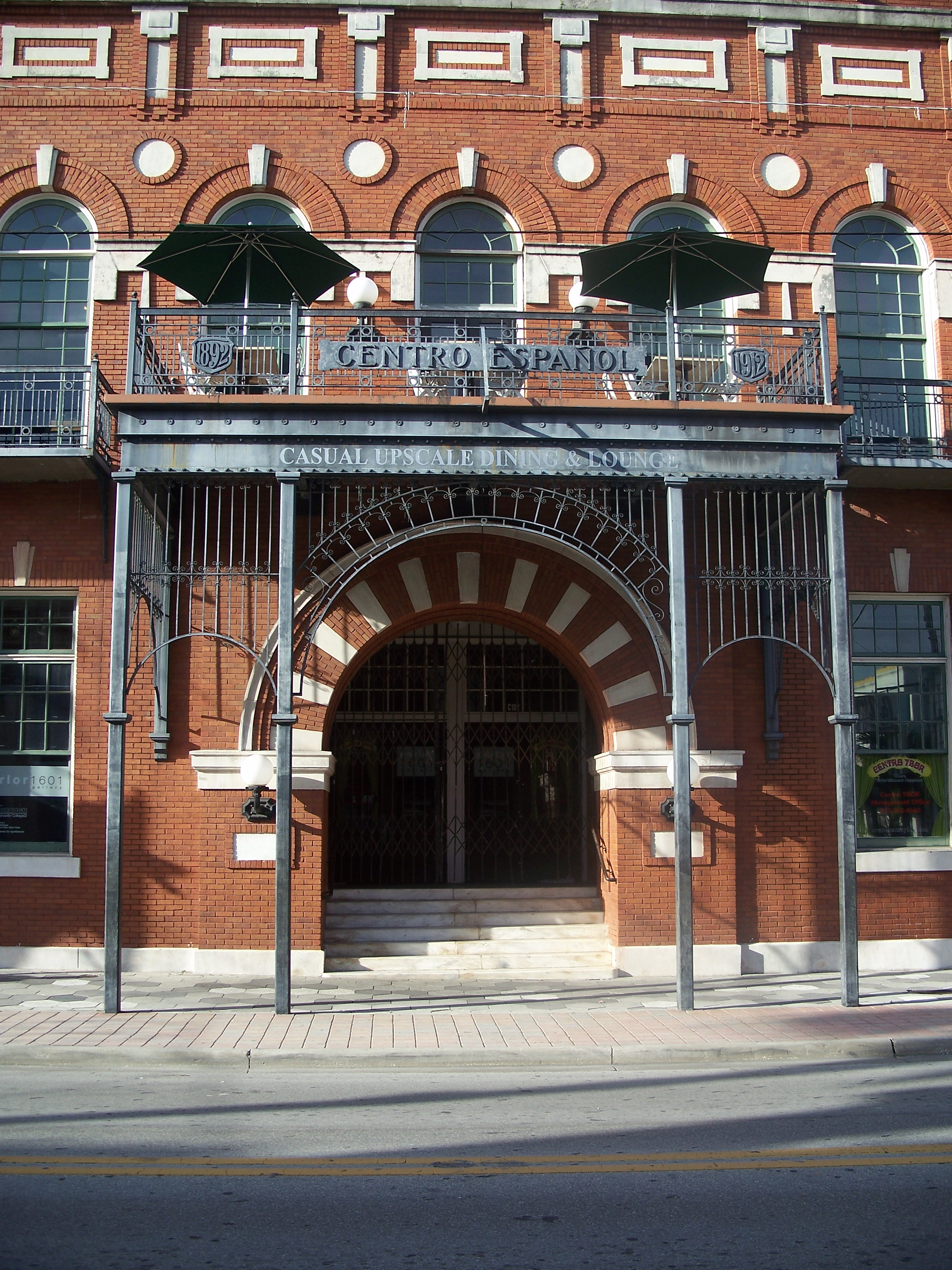
El Centro Español de Tampa Moorish styled front entry

Immigrants from Spain (including some by way of Cuba) to the bustling factory town of Ybor City in 1891 established El Centro Español as the first of several ethnic social club and mutual aid society organizations. El Centro Español served as the organizational model for its later counterparts such as El Centro Asturiano, El Circulo Cubano, L'Unione Italiana, and others. These clubs grew to play vital roles in Ybor City's development and were of particular importance in welcoming and orienting new arrivals to the immigrant community. In exchange for membership dues, they offered not only social, cultural, and recreational opportunities, but educational programs and health care. El Centro Español in 1904 went so far as to build their own hospital, the Sanatorio del Centro Español, which was in its day among the top medical facilities in Florida.

The organization's first clubhouse, an ornately constructed frame structure flanked by two towers, was built in 1892 on the site of the present Centro Español building, and featured a theater, dance hall, canteen, soda fountain, and classrooms, where English courses were offered. The club's membership expanded rapidly, surpassing 2,600 people by 1908, and soon after outgrew their facility. The club replaced their original clubhouse with the building today known as El Centro Español de Tampa in 1912. In the same year, the organization established a second clubhouse, El Centro Español de West Tampa, to serve the Spanish population of West Tampa.

After several decades of prosperity and growth, El Centro Español and the other area social clubs entered a period of decline. Factors such as Prohibition, the Great Depression, and restrictions in immigration curtailed the influx of potential new membership, and sent much of the area's existing population looking for work elsewhere. By World War II, much of the organization's roles in terms of health care and social welfare were absorbed by government and private interests. The membership base declined further as the now second and third generation Spanish-Americans more freely interacted with the rest of the population and more closely identified with American culture.

In 1983, the organization consolidated their remaining membership to the West Tampa clubhouse, and the Centro Español de Tampa building was sold. After sitting vacant for several years, it was restored in 2010 and now houses Ghost Party Haunted Tours. The West Tampa clubhouse houses The Hillsborough Education Foundation and its Teaching Tools for Hillsborough Schools program.

== Architecture ==
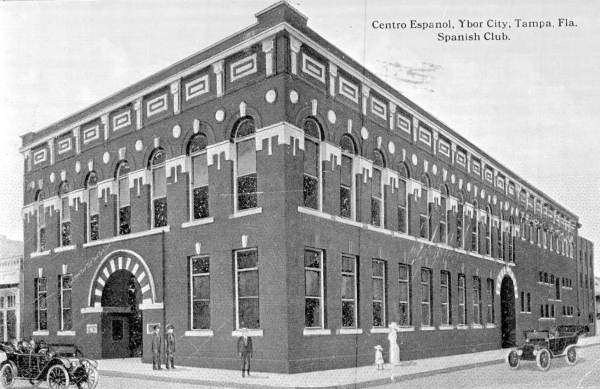
El Centro Español in 1914, two years after its inauguration

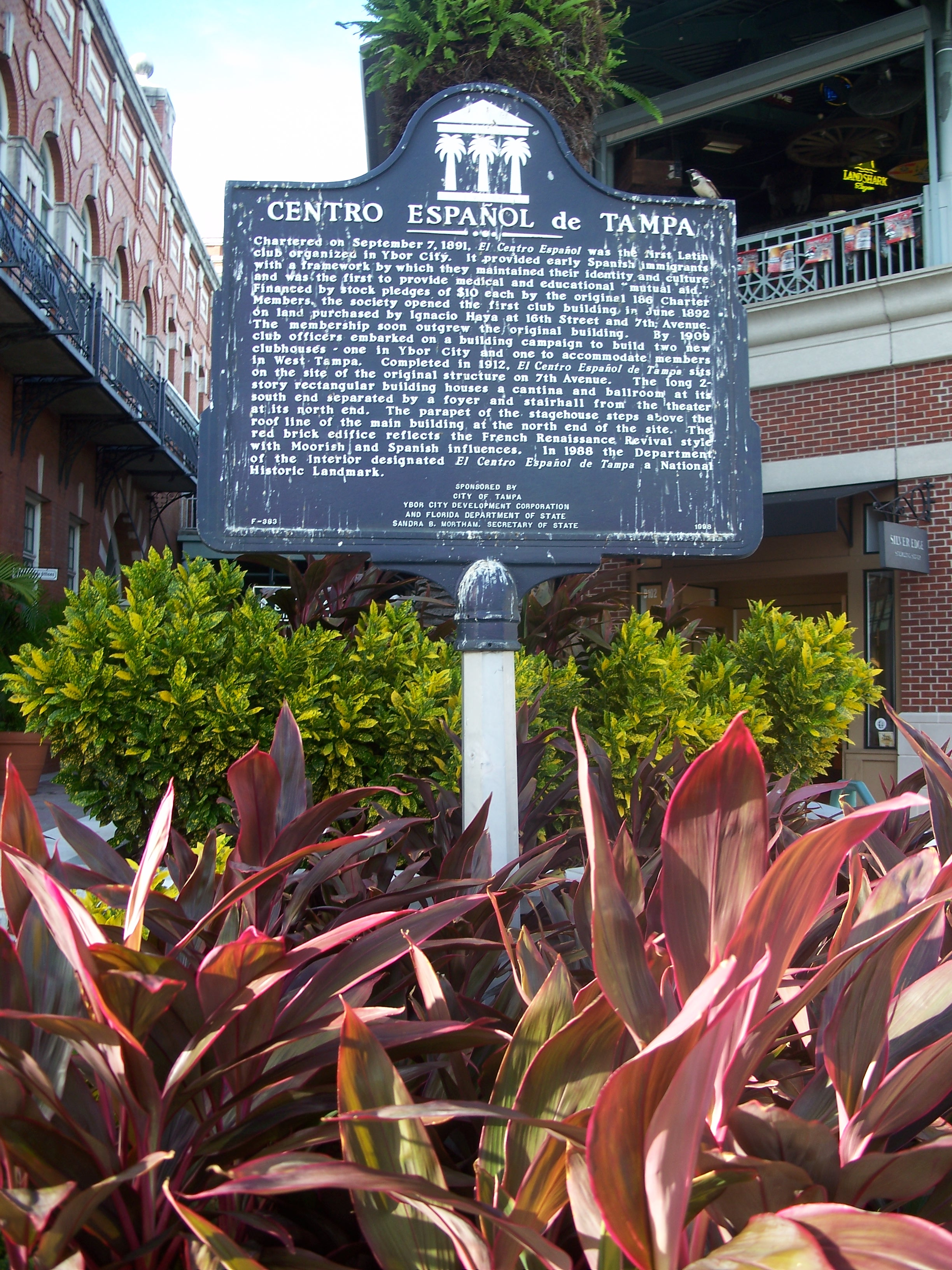
Historical Marker

The Centro Español building was designed by Francis J. Kennard, an architect who was responsible, either solely or in part, for many Tampa Bay area structures now considered to be of historic importance, including Hillsborough High School, St. Andrews Episcopal Church, and the Belleview-Biltmore Hotel. Kennard employed the French Renaissance Revival style in his design for the building, with heavy influence from Moorish Revival and Spanish Mediterranean Revival styles.

The structure features masonry construction of red brick with white stone accents. The shape is a basic rectangle, exposed on all but the west side, consisting of a 2 1/2-story-tall main block, with an attached rear wing of 3 1/2 stories. The building's south facade along 7th Avenue features an arched main entrance in Moorish style with cast-iron trim. The long, east facade resembles a palazzo, an effect commonly utilized in Renaissance Revival designs, and also incorporates the use of cast-iron balconies.

== See also ==
- El Centro Español of West Tampa
- Centro Asturiano de Tampa
- Circulo Cubano de Tampa
- The Mutual Aid Societies of Ybor City
- Ybor City Historic District
