= Circulo Cubano de Tampa =

- U.S. National Register of Historic Places
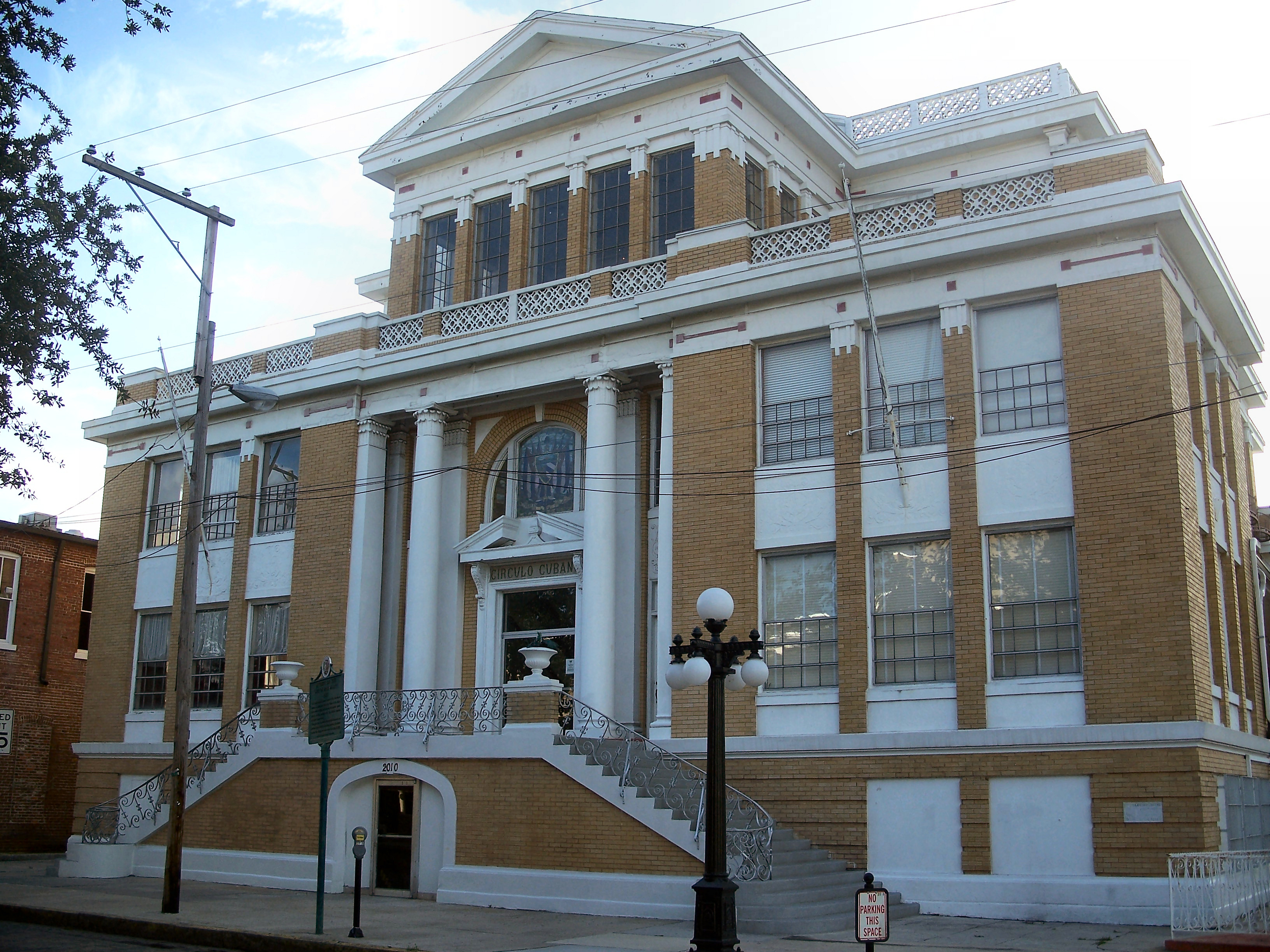

- Location within Florida Location within the United States
- Location: 10th Ave. and 14th St., Tampa, Florida
- Coordinates: 27°57′44″N 82°26′40″W
- Area: less than one acre
- NRHP reference No.: 72000320
- Added to NRHP: November 15, 1972

Informational sign in front of Cuban Club

El Circulo Cubano de Tampa (also known as the Cuban Club) is an American historic building constructed in 1917 (to replace an earlier structure on the same site that burned down) to serve as a gathering place for Cuban immigrants in Ybor City, Tampa, Florida. It was designed by Tampa architect M. Leo Elliott. It is located at Palm Avenue and 14th Street. On November 15, 1972, it was added to the U.S. National Register of Historic Places. On April 18, 2012, the AIA's Florida Chapter placed the building on its list of Florida Architecture: 100 Years. 100 Places as Cuban Club, Ybor City.

The building has a theater and once included a bowling alley, spa, pharmacy, ballroom, library, and cantina. Decorated with imported tile, stained glass, scraffito spandrels and murals it continues the legacy of the club first established in 1902 as a mutual aid society.

== History ==
=== Early history ===
El Circulo Cubano can trace its history back to an earlier organization called El Club Nacional Cubano which was founded October 10, 1899. The organization changed its name to El Círculo Cubano in 1902 with the goal of a being a fraternal organization of Cubans in Tampa and to assist each other and help with medical care like other mutual aid societies in the city. The first building was completed in 1908 and was located on 10th Avenue and 14th Street and was a two-story, redbrick building and featured a veranda and looked like many other buildings on East 7th Avenue. It was destroyed in a fire in 1916. At the time of the fire the Cuban Club had about 2,600 members and they contributed towards creating a larger and more permanent structure. Many young Cuban men were attracted to the Cuban Club since they heavily promoted athletics and had a boxing ring and a gym behind the club building. Membership numbers heavily fluctuated throughout the years.

=== Later History ===
After years of financial difficulties the Cuban Club building faced foreclosure in 1992, but the Cuban Club Foundation kept the building alive with cash donations, and in 1994 the Foundation received a grant from the state of Florida. Other charity fundraisers were held to raise money to help restore the historic building. Much restoration work was completed in 1995, but on New Year's Day 1996 part of the ballroom ceiling collapsed due to years of neglect and decay and destroyed part of a 70 year old mural by Juan Aciego.

== See also ==
- The Mutual Aid Societies of Ybor City
- El Centro Español de Tampa
- Centro Asturiano de Tampa
- Ybor City Historic District
