= Tampa Free Library =

- Old Tampa Free Public Library
- U.S. National Register of Historic Places
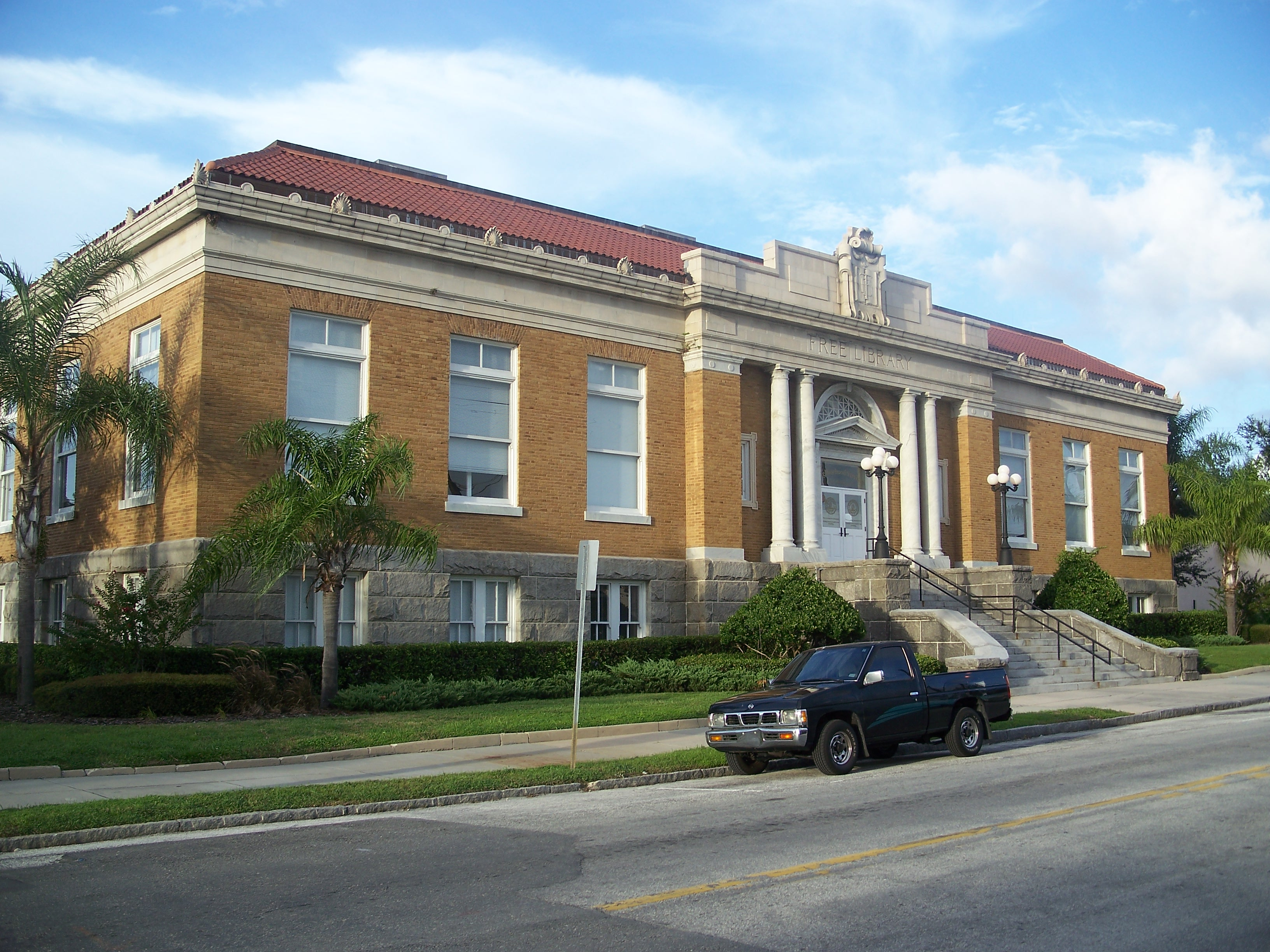

- Location within Florida Location within the United States
- Location: 102 E. Seventh Ave., Tampa, Florida
- Coordinates: 27°57′37″N 82°27′38″W
- Area: less than one acre
- Architect: Fred J. James; Aulick, Bates & Hundall
- Architectural style: Classical Revival
- NRHP reference No.: 91000618
- Added to NRHP: May 16, 1991

The Old Tampa Free Public Library (also known as the Exceptional Children Education Center) is a historic building in the Tampa Heights neighborhood of Tampa, Florida. Located at 102 E. 7th Avenue, it was one of 10 Florida Carnegie libraries to receive grants awarded by the Carnegie Corporation of New York from 1901 to 1917. It was designed by Tampa architect Fred J. James and constructed from 1915 to 1917. It was added to the National Register of Historic Places in 1991.

Steel magnate and philanthropist Andrew Carnegie provided funding for more than 3,000 Carnegie libraries in the United States, Canada, and Europe. The library was built using a $50,000 grant from Carnegie. The library's first director was Helen V. Stelle.

It was Tampa's main library until 1968. It includes a T-plan, masonry, brown and yellow brick atop a rusticated granite basement, and is topped by a barrel tile roof. The building was rehabilitated in 1999 by the City of Tampa for public offices. It has been occupied by the administrative staff of the Tampa-Hillsborough County Public Library System since November 2016 and also houses the Hillsborough Literacy Council, which is affiliated with the Tampa-Hillsborough County Public Library system.

== Library Usage and Floorplan ==
The library was widely used by patrons across Tampa who had fewer branches to choose from at the time of its use as an active branch. University students would enjoy the ample collection in order to do the research and study required of them. High school students would also research at the branch, and some would enjoy going to the pool hall across the street from the library, which was notorious among patrons as well as librarians for having a diverse and interesting clientele that was not always a welcome presence at the library and would sometimes be a source of mischief. At the "7th Avenue Library," as it was called by some patrons, children would enjoy storytelling, which would happen once or twice in the afternoon according to patron memories, and book selection in the children's library on west side of the basement level.

Bernadette Storck, a worker of the library with the cataloging and processing department, details her memories of the library's floorplan and processes: The library had a circulation desk on the first floor, with reference on one side and popular materials on the other. In the downstairs area, the west side housed the children's department, where story time took place and children's material was kept. On the east side of that floor, cataloging and processing took place. This involved hand lettering along spines in order to determine branches and subjects. The bookmobile collection was also housed there, as Tampa's first bookmobile was kept at the Tampa Free Library. Upon patron request, back issues of newspapers and magazines, kept behind smoked glass, would be sent upstairs. A dumbwaiter was used to put materials in and take them upstairs, as the building's current elevator had not been added yet.

== History ==
=== Funding and Construction ===
The Old Tampa Free Public Library was one of the first of only ten public libraries in Florida to receive a grant from Andrew Carnegie in order to construct and establish public community libraries. During the beginning of the 20th century, the society editor of the Tampa Tribune, Louise Frances Dodge, initiated the grab for the Carnegie funding for a library in Tampa in 1905. After much debate regarding Carnegie's money, Tampa was awarded a $25,000 grant in 1912. In 1913, it was increased to $50,000.

After another lengthy debate about location, the Old Tampa Free Public Library (also known as the Exceptional Children Education Center) was erected at 102 E. Seventh Avenue and completed June 30, 1915. The refusal of Tampa's city council to fund the new library, it was not opened to the public until April 27, 1917, after settling for $10,000 per year to the library. It served as Tampa's main library until 1968. It is now home to the City of Tampa's Community Affairs Department.

=== Decline and Closure ===
Over the decades, the library was no longer able to adequately meet the needs of the growing population. Concerns over the small size of the library, lack of expansion, and inability to assist the growing population eventually led to a new building being constructed in downtown Tampa. The original building was constructed and designed to serve 50,000 people which was adequate at the time of its construction. However, by the early 1960s, Tampa maintained a population of 274,407 people. In addition, other old, historical libraries in Tampa were also unable to meet the needs of the public due to poor parking, small size, and cramped collections. This led to questions of whether newer, larger libraries should begin replacing the older, historical models. The Tampa Free library endeavored to cater to the population by expanding hours. In April 1960 the Tampa Public Library's expanded its hours, from 9 a.m. to 9 p.m. Monday through Saturday, increasing the library's open hours from 66 to 72 hours per week. This was done with the hope that it would be more convenient for people working downtown to visit the library.

In 1961, the library was no longer seen as an adequate facility for the growing city of Tampa. As evidenced in an article by the Tampa Tribune in 1961, the library designed to serve a community of 52,000 people was rightfully determined to be insufficient for a community of 274,407 people. A former worker of the library who'd been involved in cataloging and processing also recalled insufficient shelving space, stating that the huge collection of books, newspapers, and magazines was "falling off the shelves." Patrons also had to travel quite far to reach the library, as it was being used by patrons who lived in Hyde Park and Palma Ceia.

Eventually the need for space and change led to the creation of a new main library, and on April 21, 1968, The Tampa Public Library (renamed John F. Germany Public Library in 1999) opened on 900 N Ashley Drive. The John F. Germany Public Library still serves as the main library in the Tampa-Hillsborough County Library system.

=== Usage After Closure ===
In 1968, the building was converted into a center for academically advanced students, the "Exceptional Children Education Center". This program ended in 1986 when the city stopped busing gifted students out of their local schools. In 1987, the city of Tampa sold the building to the nonprofit Tampa Bay Economic Development Corporation for $1. The corporation would do the necessary renovations and improvements after finding someone to lease the building and repay those costs over time. In 1995, the Tampa Free Library once again garnered notice after the roof had to be patched to stop an influx of water from destroying the interior. It was at this time that Tampa's Architectural Review Commission unanimously voted to recommend the building for local landmark designation. In 1998, the United Way of Hillsborough County considered making the Tampa Free Library building its new headquarters, but reconsidered due to the price tag of renovating the then 83-year-old-building. In 1999 the city agreed to foot the 2.2 million dollar renovation costs by entering a 25-year lease agreement with Tampa Bay Economic Development Corporation, at the end of which, the city would purchase the building back for the $1 they sold it for in 1987. Beginning in 1999, three agencies would share the newly renovated space: The Division of Neighborhood Improvement, the Women & Minority Business Enterprise Program, and the Office of Human Rights and Community Services. In November 2016, the administrative offices for the Tampa-Hillsborough County Public Library were relocated to the Tampa Free Library from the fourth floor of the John. F. Germany Library in downtown Tampa.

In May 2024, USF approached the county about repurposing the Tampa Free Library into an art museum.

== References and external links ==
- Hillsborough County listings at National Register of Historic Places
- Florida's Office of Cultural and Historical Programs
  - Hillsborough County listings
  - Old Tampa Free Public Library

== Gallery ==
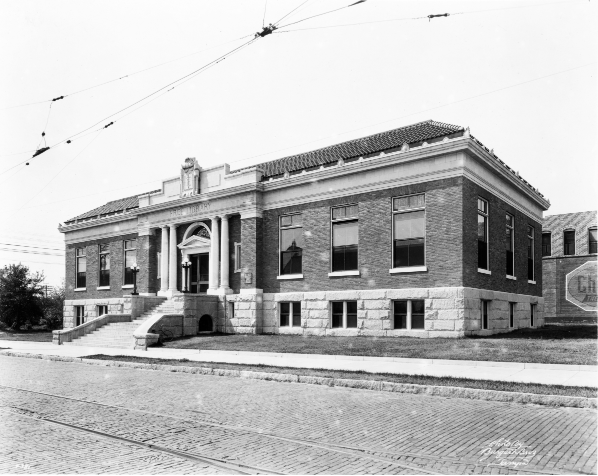
The Tampa Free Library on the roadside on March 18, 1919

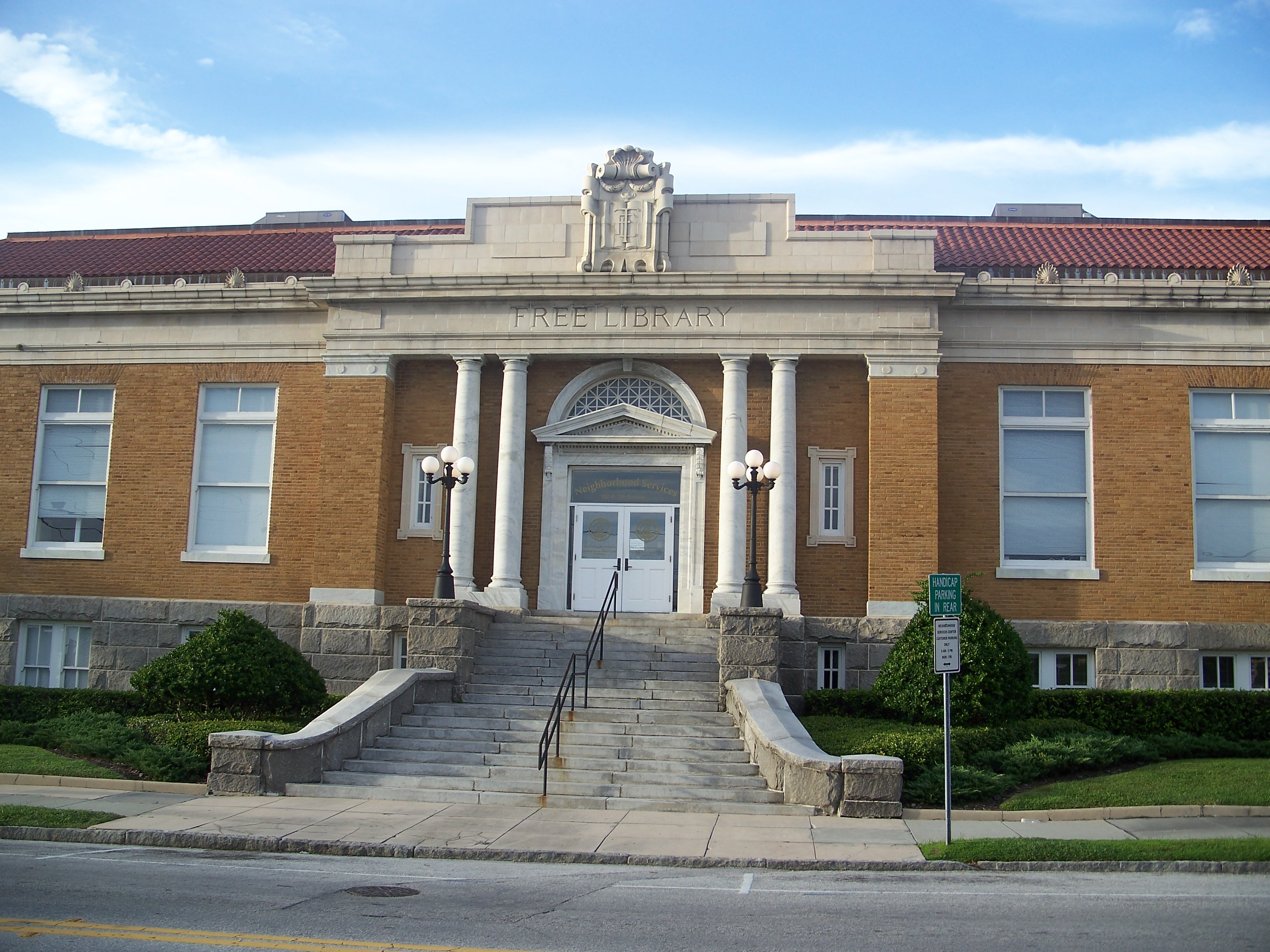
Front of Tampa Free Library

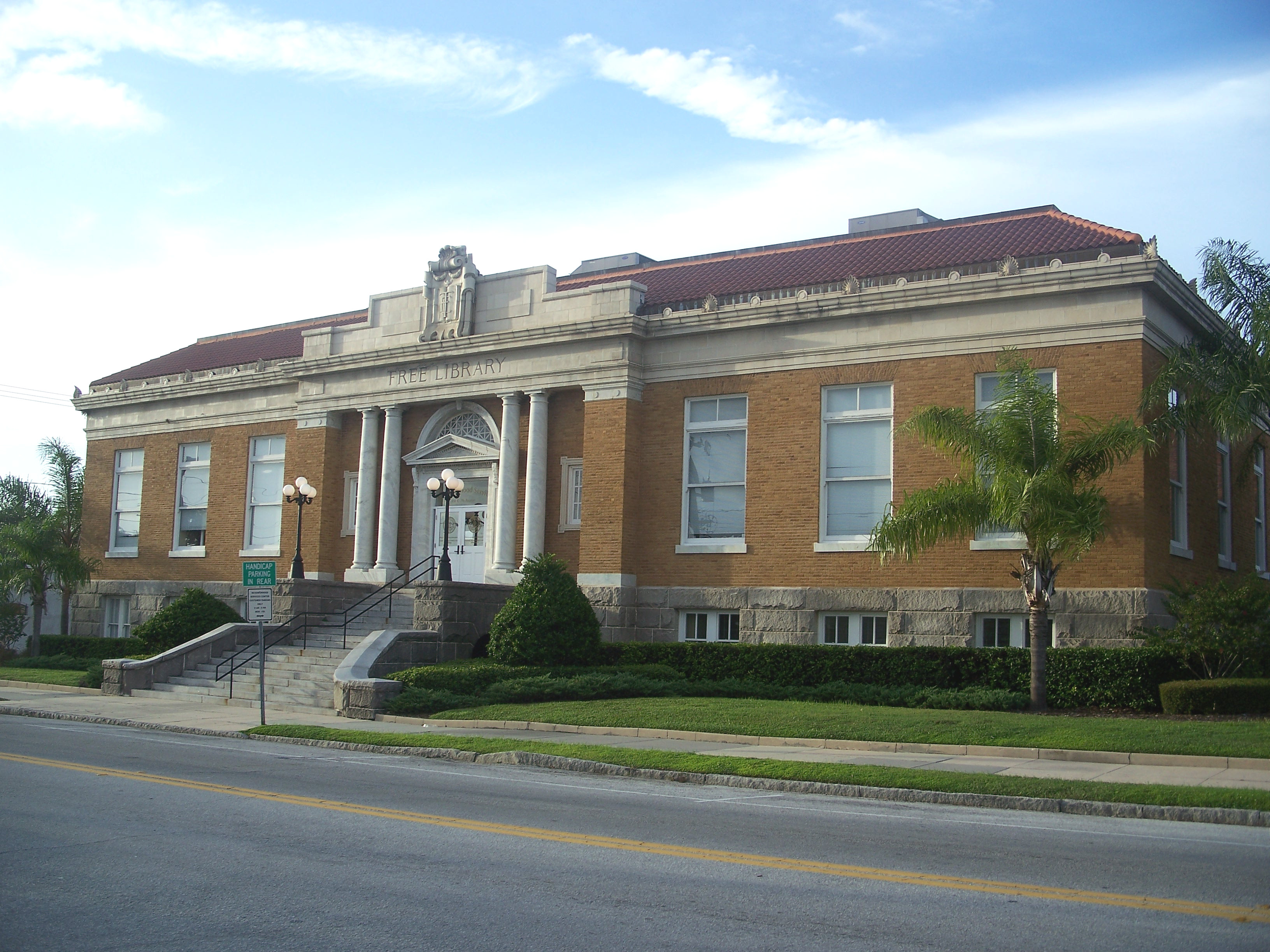
The Tampa Free Library on the roadside in the 2000s

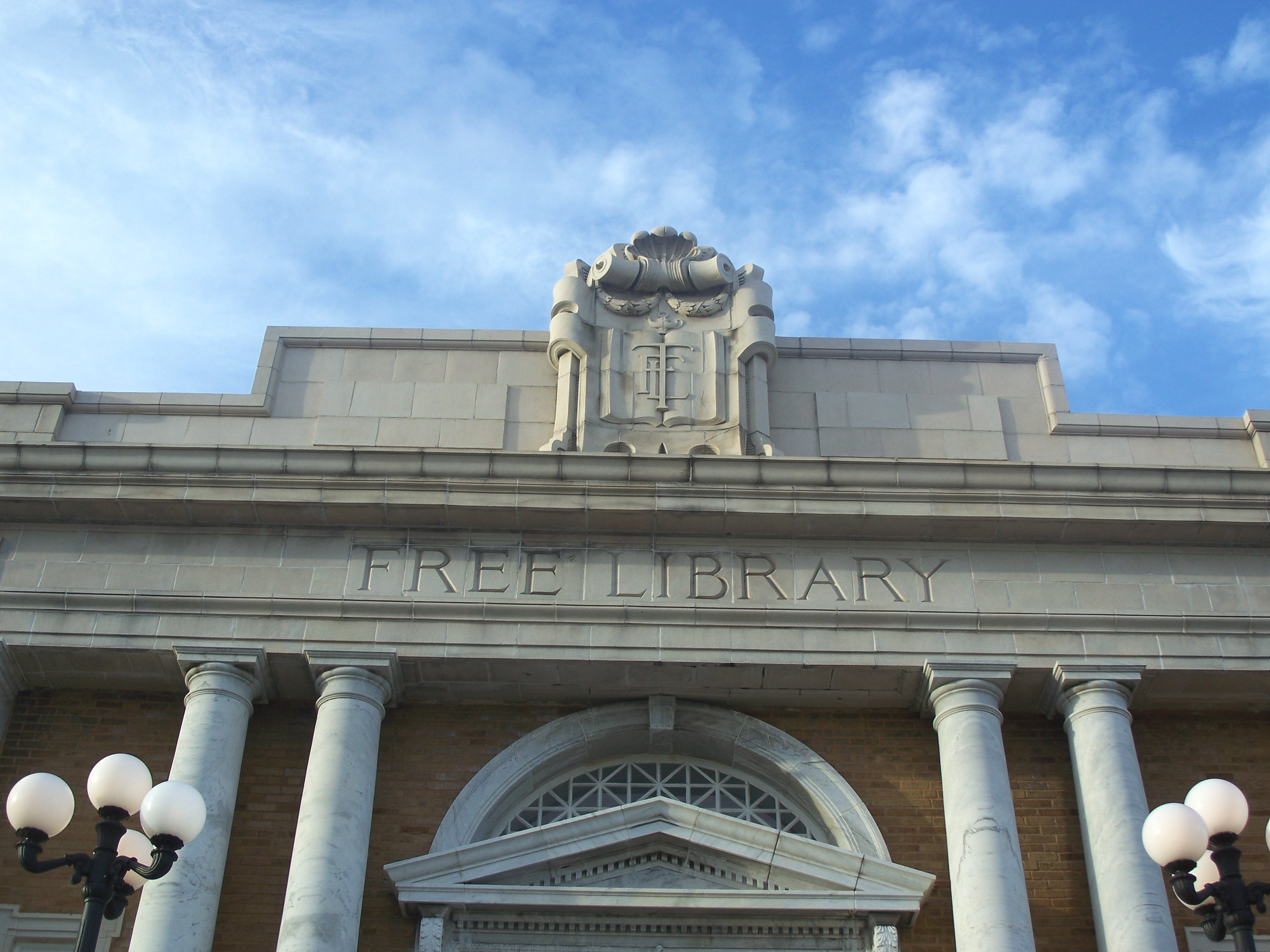
Detail of Tampa Free Library building
