= Ybor City Historic District =

Historic district in Florida, United States

- U.S. National Register of Historic Places
- U.S. National Historic Landmark District
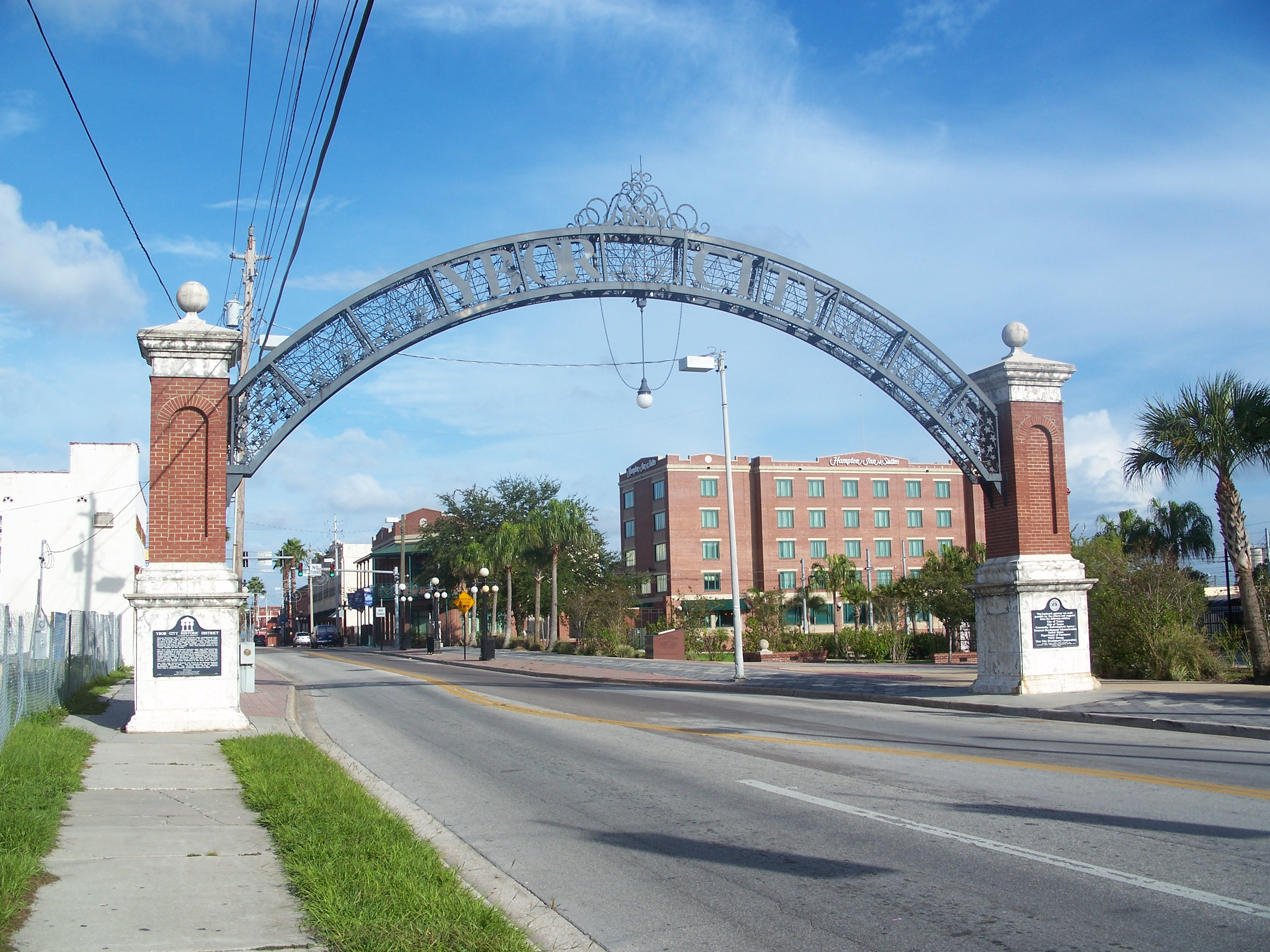
- Western entrance gate into Ybor City

- Location within Florida Location within the United States
- Location: Tampa, Florida
- Coordinates: 27.9615°0′N 82.4386°0′W
- Area: 369 acres (149 ha)
- NRHP reference No.: 74000641

Significant dates
- Added to NRHP: August 28, 1974
- Designated NHLD: December 14, 1990

The Ybor City Historic District (/ˈiːbɔːr/ EE-bor) is a U.S. National Historic Landmark District (designated as such on December 14, 1990) located in Ybor City, Tampa, Florida. The district is bounded by 6th Avenue, 13th Street, 10th Avenue and 22nd Street, East Broadway between 13th and 22nd Streets. Ybor City contains a total of 956 historic buildings, including an unparalleled collection of architecture with Spanish-Cuban influence, as well as historic cigar factory buildings and associated infrastructure. The area was developed by businessman Vicente Martinez Ybor beginning in 1886, and was for a time the world's leading supplier of cigars.

The Ybor City Museum State Park is located in the former Ferlita Bakery building (originally La Joven Francesca) building on 9th Avenue. Tours of the gardens and the "casitas" (small homes of cigar company workers) are provided by a ranger. Exhibits, period photos and a video cover the founding of Ybor City and the cigar making industry.

The Latino Barrio Commission, a city of Tampa-sanctioned committee of neighborhood community and business leaders, architects, and local residents, is charged with "preserving the historic fabric of the District and maintaining its architectural integrity."

== District boundaries ==
The original Ybor City development covers an area roughly bounded on the north by 21st Avenue, the east by 22nd Street, the west by Nebraska Avenue, and the south by Adamo Drive. In 1974, an area centered on Ybor City's 7th Avenue business district was listed on the National Register of Historic Places. The landmark district designated in 1990 substantially enlarged this to include much of the surviving architecture of the development. That district consists of three separate sections, separated due to the construction of Interstate 4 and by an urban renewal project in 1965 that resulted in the demolition of 70 acres (28 ha) of historic buildings and the construction of the Nick Nuccio Parkway.

== Gallery ==
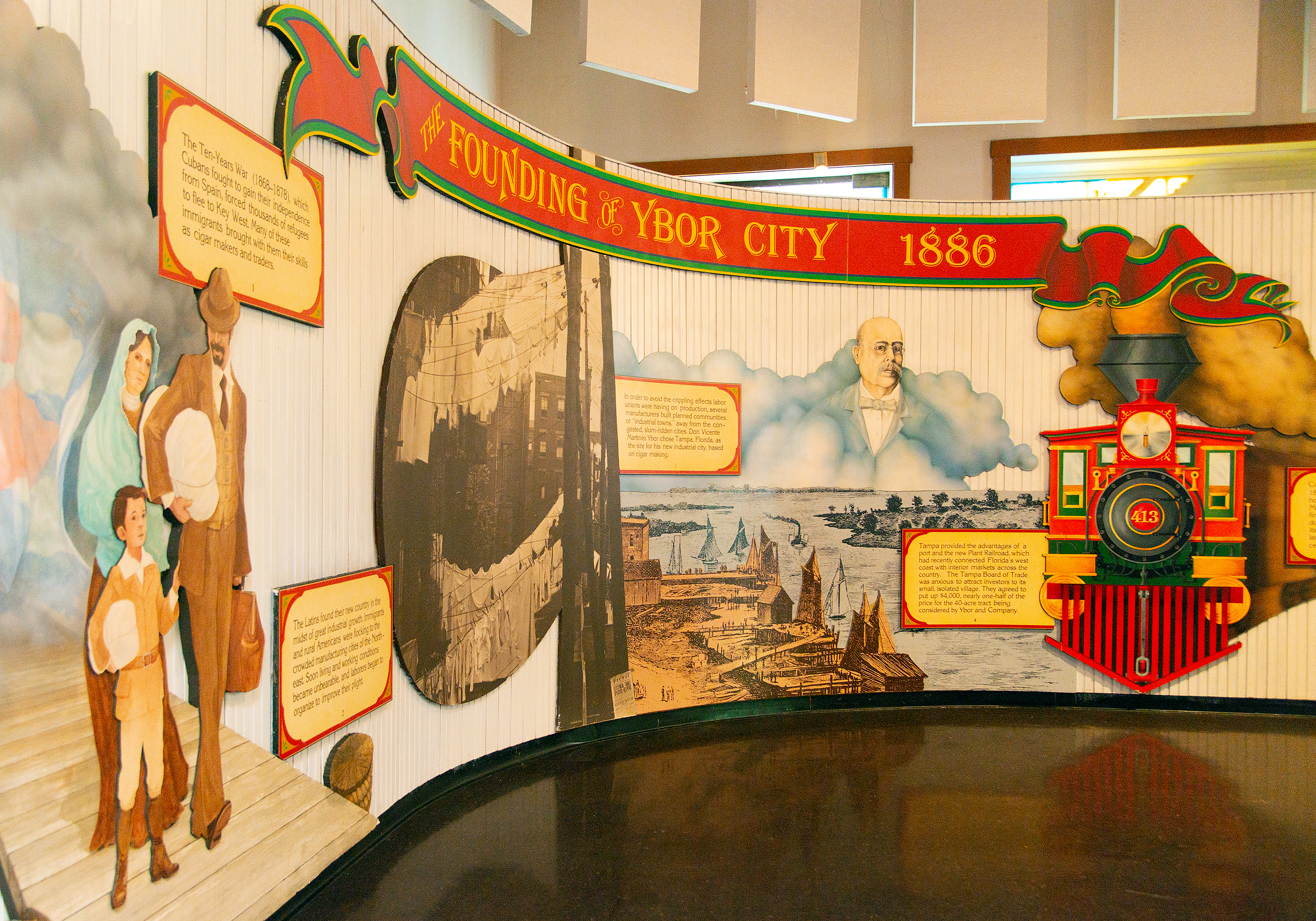
Historic display, Ybor City Museum State Park

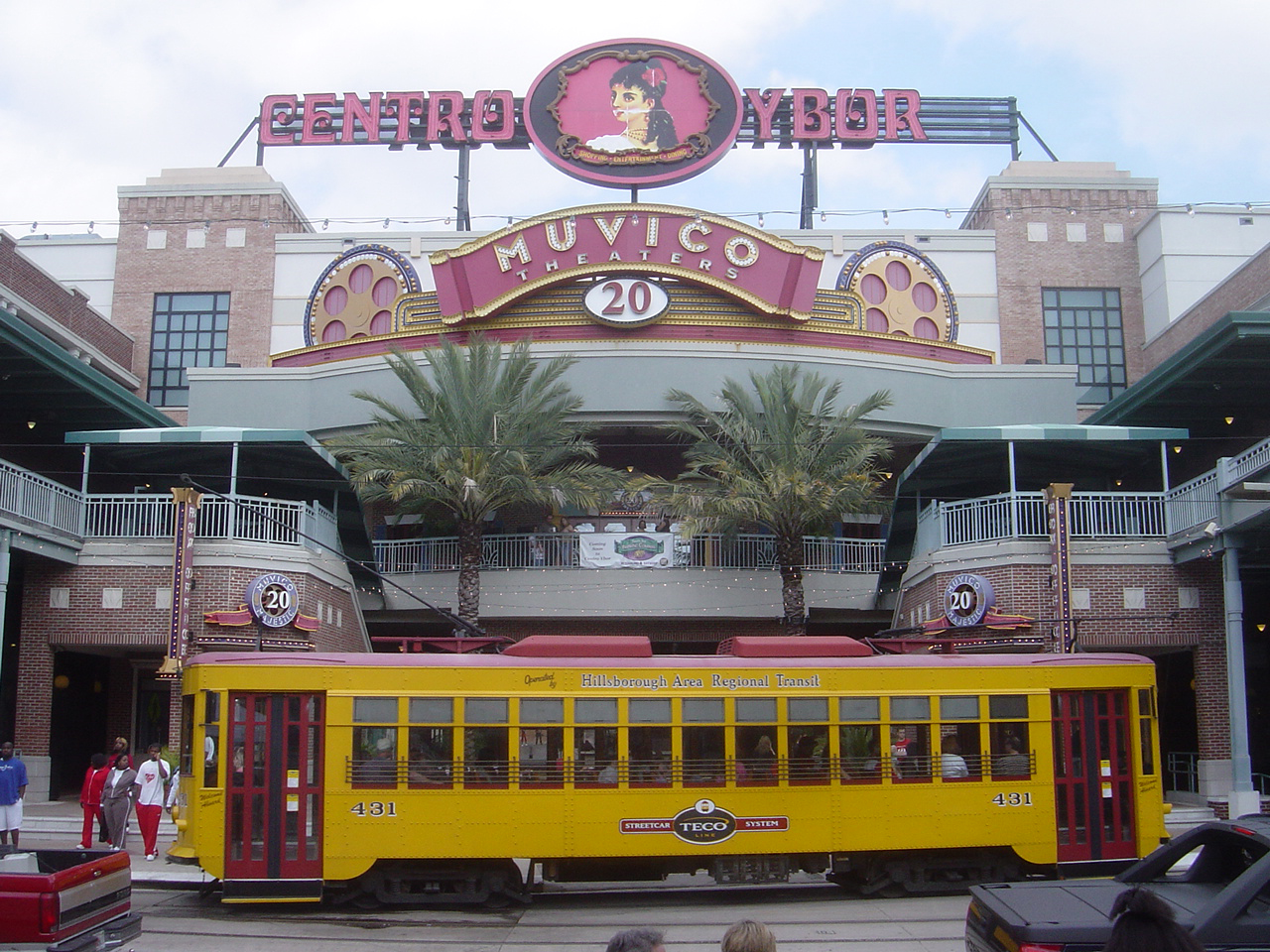
Centro Ybor and a TECO streetcar

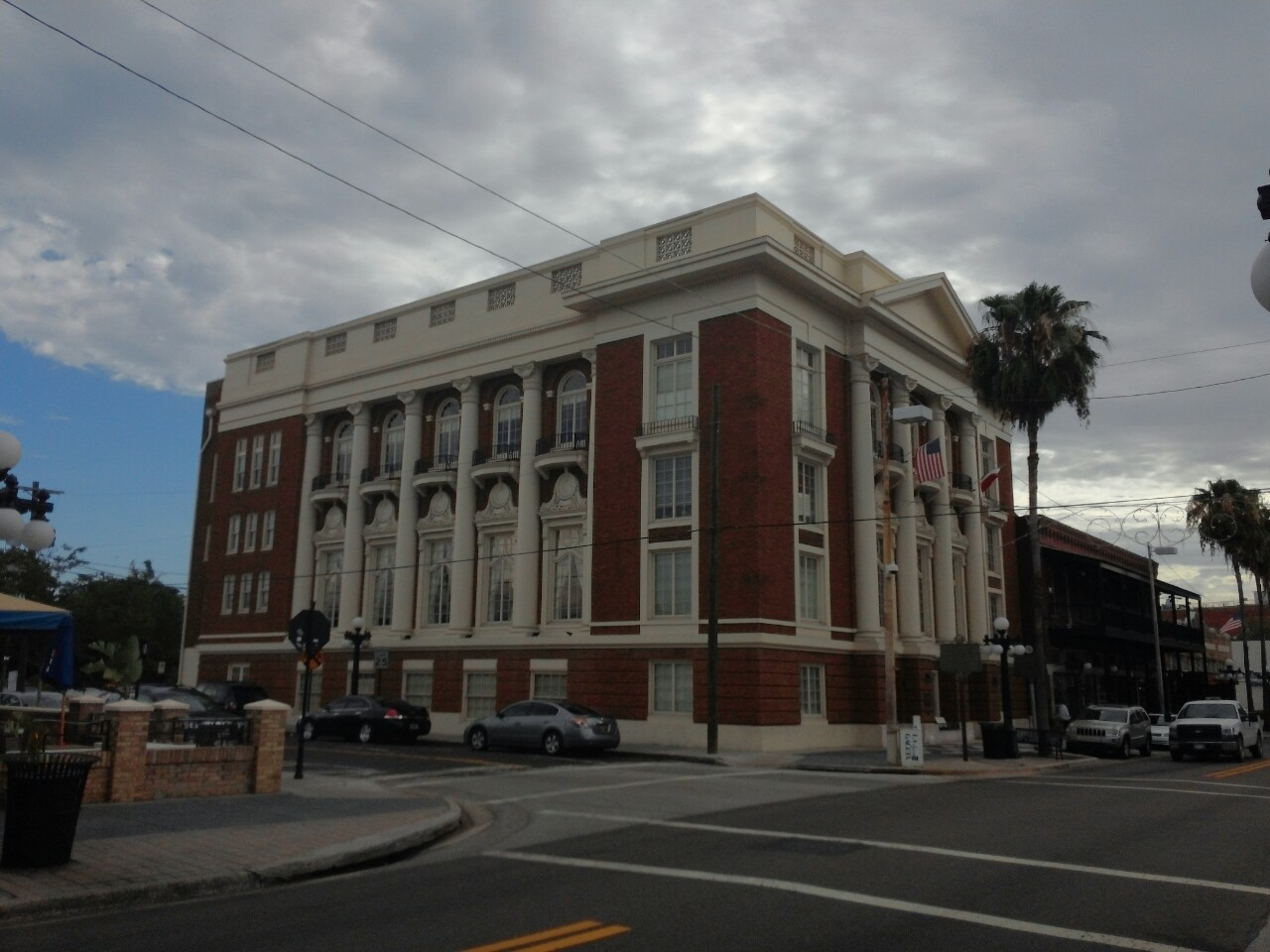
The Italian Club of Tampa - 2014

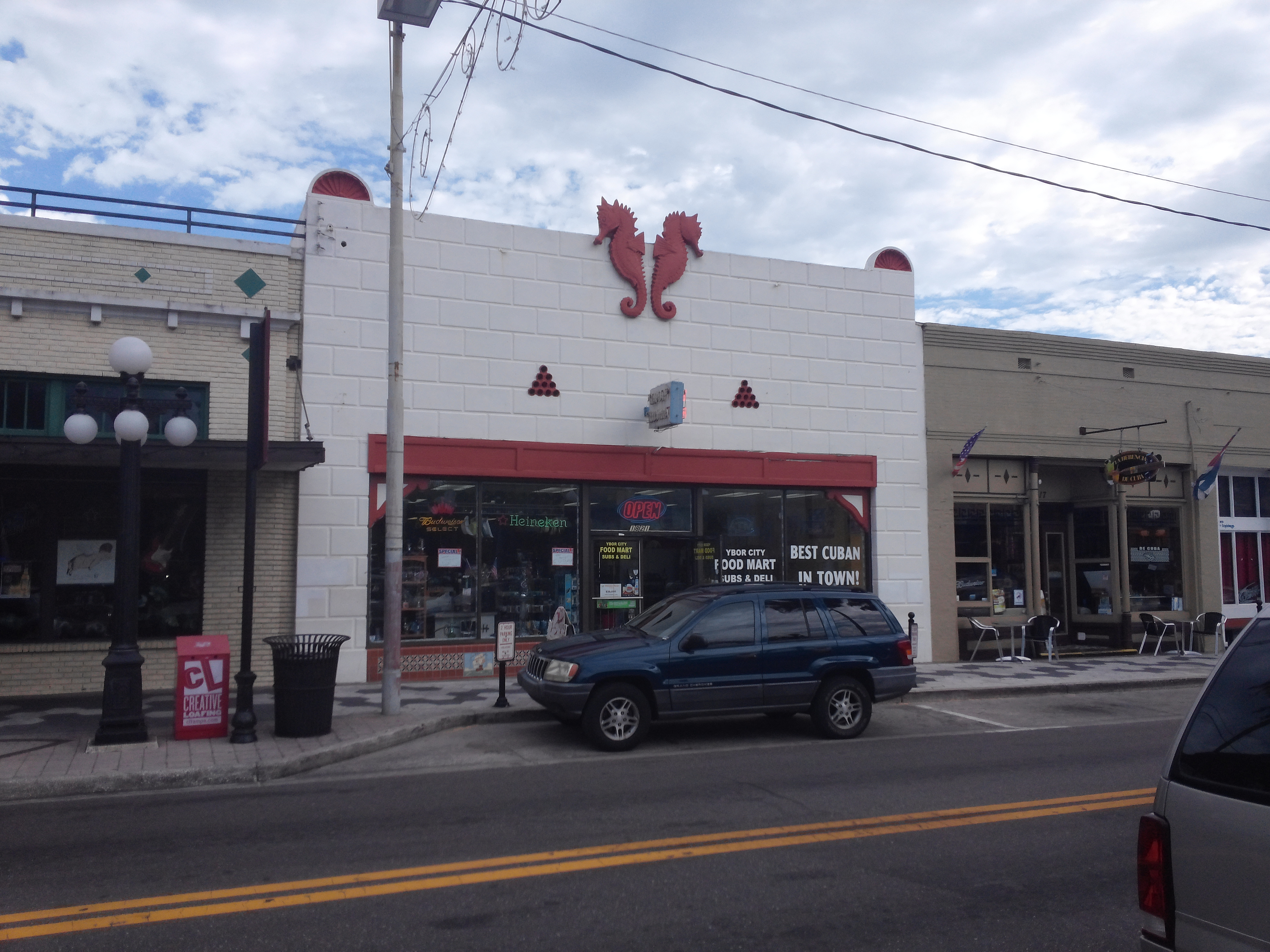
Ybor City Food Mart - 2014

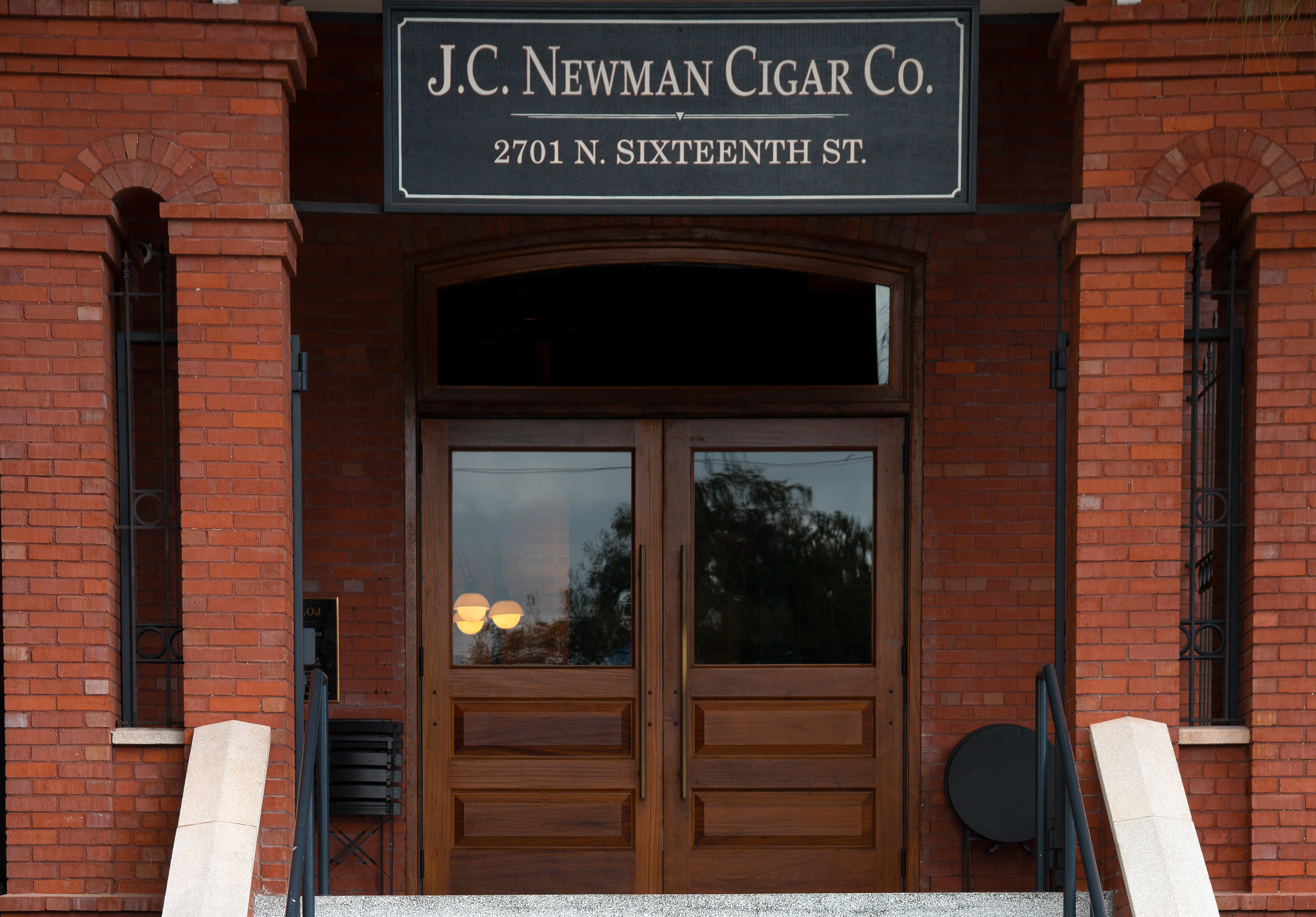
J.C. Newman cigar factory, still in operation - 2023

== See also ==
- List of National Historic Landmarks in Florida
- National Register of Historic Places listings in Tampa, Florida
