= Unanue =

Unanue may refer to:

== People ==
- Unanue family, the founders of Goya Foods
- Andy Unanue, American businessman
- Emil R. Unanue (born 1934), American immunologist
- Gustavo Adolfo de Unanue (born 1973), Mexican lawyer and politician
- Hipólito Unanue (1755–1833), Peruvian politician and scientist
- Joseph A. Unanue (1925–2013), American businessman
- Mikel Unanue (born 1982), Spanish curler

== Other uses ==
- Unanue, La Pampa, Argentina
- BAP Unanue (AMB-136), a tug of the Peruvian navy
