= Handwerker =

Handwerker (German for "craftsman") is a German surname. Notable people with the surname include:

- Carol Handwerker, American materials scientist
- Murray Handwerker (1921–2011), American businessman ("Nathan's Famous"), son of Nathan
- Nathan Handwerker (1892–1974), Austria-Hungarian-born American restaurateur ("Nathan's Famous")
- Tim Handwerker (born 1998), German footballer
