= Co-branding =

Marketing strategy

Co-branding is a marketing strategy that involves strategic alliance of multiple brand names jointly used on a single product or service.

Co-branding is an arrangement that associates a single product or service with more than one brand name, or otherwise associates a product with someone other than the principal producer. The typical co-branding agreement involves two or more companies acting in cooperation to associate any of various logos, color schemes, or brand identifiers to a specific product that is contractually designated for this purpose. The objective for this is to combine the strength of two brands, to increase the premium consumers are willing to pay, make the product or service more resistant to copying by private label manufacturers, or to combine the different perceived properties associated with these brands with a single product.

An early instance of co-branding occurred in 1956 when Renault had Jacques Arpels of jewelers Van Cleef and Arpels turn the dashboard of one of their newly introduced Dauphines into a work of art.

Co-branding (also called brand partnership) as described in Co-Branding: The Science of Alliance, is when two companies form an alliance to work together, thus creating marketing synergy.

== Digital co-branding ==
Digital co-branding is a digital marketing strategy which follows the basics of co-branding, but aligns an advertiser's brand with a digital publisher that has the same target audience. Publishing platform would have to give up some editorial control to activate content for advertiser's brand. Travel websites are more open to building co-branding programs. They engage their audience in every process throughout the booking process. For example, snow update website features its ad on ski resorts website. If the co-branding ad placed is relevant and engaging, it is more effective than a normal internet ad. It helps the advertiser to connect and interact with more consumers.

For example, The Huffington Post have partnered with Johnson & Johnson on topics like woman and children written by Huffington Post independent reporters.

Digital co-branding should be carried out along with Programmatic buying to be more efficient and effective in Digital Media Marketing Campaigns.

== Types of co-branding ==
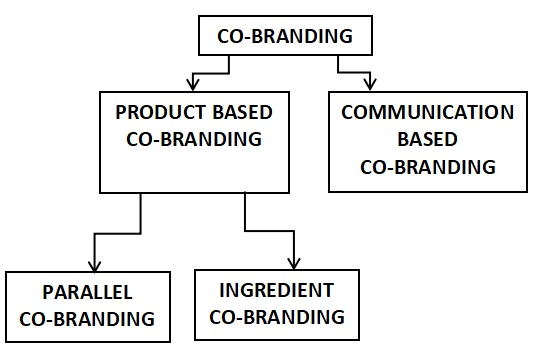

The two types of co-branding are Product-based co-branding and Communications based co-branding.

== Product-based co-branding ==
Product-based co-branding is a marketing strategy that involves linking of multiple brands from different companies in order to create a product indicative of their individual identities. Product-based co-branding maybe categorized into Parallel and Ingredient co-branding.

=== Parallel co-branding ===
Parallel co-branding is the marketing strategy where multiple brands come together and create a combined brand.

=== Ingredient co-branding ===
Ingredient co-branding is a marketing strategy carried out by a supplier where an ingredient of a product chooses to position its brand.

=== Advantages of product-based co-branding ===
- Value addition and differentiation
- Access to new customers
- Better integrated communication
- Positioning
- Reduction of product introduction cost

=== Disadvantages of product-based co-branding ===
- Loss of control
- Poor performance of co-brand

== Communications-based co-branding ==
Communications-based co-branding is a marketing strategy that involves linking of multiple brands from different companies in order to jointly communicate and promote their brands.

=== Advantages of communication-based co-branding ===
- Endorsement opportunities
- Sharing advertising costs
- Resource sharing
- Enhances awareness
- increase the competitive advantages

=== Disadvantages of communication-based co-branding ===
- Difference of opinion
- Negative co-brand image
- Poor performance of co-brand

== Intent ==
According to Chang, from the Journal of American Academy of Business, Cambridge, there are three levels of co-branding: market share, brand extension, and global branding.

- Level 1 includes joining with another company to penetrate the market.
- Level 2 is working to extend the brand based on the company's current market share.
- Level 3 tries to achieve a global strategy by combining the two brands.

== Forms of co-branding ==
There are many different subsections of co-branding. Companies can work with other companies to combine resources and leverage individual core competencies, or they can use current resources within one company to promote multiple products at once. The forms of co-branding include: ingredient co-branding, same-company co-branding, national to locally co-branding, joint venture co-branding, and multiple sponsor co-branding. No matter which form a company chooses to use, the purpose is to respond to the changing marketplace, build one’s own core competencies, and work to increase product revenues.

One form of co-branding is ingredient co-branding. This involves creating brand equity for materials, components or parts that are contained within other products.

Examples:

- Betty Crocker’s brownie mix includes Hershey’s Chocolate Syrup
- Pillsbury Brownies with Nestlé Chocolate
- Dell Computers with Intel Processors
- Kellogg Pop-Tarts with Smucker’s fruit
- Taco Bell Doritos Locos Tacos

Another form of co-branding is same-company co-branding. This is when a company with more than one product promotes their own brands together simultaneously.

Examples

- Kraft Lunchables and Oscar Mayer meats
- Courtyard by Marriott, a hotel brand (Courtyard) operating under Marriott International's signature brand (Marriott)

National to local co-branding occurs when a local small business teams up with a national brand or network to target local audiences and interests.

Examples:

- Visa co-branding credit cards with local retailers
- Auto manufacturers with local dealerships

Joint venture co-branding is another form of co-branding also knowns as composite branding, where two or more well known companies go for a strategic alliance to present a product or service that neither business could successfully launch on its own to the target audience.

Example:

- British Airways and Citibank formed a partnership offering a credit card where the card owner will automatically become a member of the British Airways Executive club.

Finally, there is multiple sponsor co-branding. This form of co-branding involves two or more companies working together to form a strategic alliance in technology, promotions, sales, etc.

Example:

- Citibank/American Airlines/Visa credit card partnership

== Relationship between brand equity, brand association, and co-branding ==
Brand name indicates the customer about their connection with the brand based on information or experience. Brand equity defines the association of consumer towards a brand name. The original brand name is familiar among the customers, whereas the co-branded brand is still new. There are plenty of associations of consumers towards co-branded products. Therefore, the customer’s use constituent brand information when there is absence of new brand formed by co-branding. When there is a negative image caused by one of the constituent brand, it also affects the other constituent brand. Brand equity can be damaged by pairing up with a brand which may have negative image in future. Brand association is developed over the years by repeated experiences and exposures. It helps customers gather information, differentiate it and come to a buying decision. Co-branding can either improve or destroy customer’s perception of each constituent brands and create a new perception for the co-branded product. Research suggests that the dissimilarity between co-branding organizations (company size, company origin country, industry scale) negatively affect the performance of co-branding organizations.

== See also ==
- Brand
- Business partnering
- Colocation (business)
- Cross-promotion
- Marketing co-operation
- Store brand
