= Anti-boycott =

Reactionary support for an entity or purchase of goods to counter a boycott

An anti-boycott, counter-boycott, or buycott is the excess buying of a particular brand or product in an attempt to counter a boycott of the same brand or product. Anti-boycott measures could also be in the form of laws and regulations adopted by a state to prohibit the act of boycott among its citizens.

== Consumer activism ==
Anti-boycotts in the United States have been employed by organizations that criticize consumer activism, especially during periods when such movement—for a portion of the American public—was considered un-American. Once boycott was adopted by the labor movement as one of its tactics, opponents of that movement began organizing anti-boycott leagues in response. The usual reason for an anti-boycott is to discourage a company or entity from backing down on the decision that initially caused the boycott.

Some examples of anti-boycotts include:

- The 2006 "Buy Danish" campaign, set up to counter the boycott of Danish goods by the Middle East.
- The anti-boycotts by supporters of Israel to the oppose the BDS movement in 2009.
- Whole Foods Market was boycotted in 2009 when the CEO opposed U.S. President Barack Obama's health care reform policies. Opponents of health care reform staged nationwide "buycotts" in response.
- Chick-fil-A Appreciation Day counter-boycott of Chick-fil-A over controversy regarding LGBT people in 2012.
- Goya Foods was "boycotted" in 2020 after co-owner and CEO Robert Unanue claims of election fraud and publicly lauded U.S. President Donald Trump.
- Counter-protests of the Economic Blackout.

== Legal enforcement ==
Some anti-boycott measures are enforced by law. For example, anti-boycott provisions in the Export Administration Act of 1979 and Ribicoff Amendment to the Tax Reform Act of 1976 in the United States forbid US companies and their subsidiaries from complying with or supporting a foreign country's boycott of another country unless the US also approves of the boycott. Violations can cause the authorities to take firm measures. The Supreme Court of the United States ruled in NAACP v. Claiborne Hardware Co. that nonviolent boycotts and related activities are protected under the First Amendment to the United States Constitution. The Arab League's boycott of Israel has been the primary focus of these laws, though it applies to any "unsanctioned" foreign boycott. Beginning in 1989, the United States and several European organizations became active in internationalizing this anti-boycott effort, which led to the intensification of pressure on the European Community as well as Asian states to participate or act against the application of secondary boycotts in their countries.

Specific "unsanctioned" actions that are prohibited under the U.S. anti-boycott regulations include the refusal to do business with or in a boycotted country; discrimination against U.S. persons in employment on the basis of race, religion, sex, or national origin; provision of information about business relationships with a boycotted country due to its relationship with a boycotted country; and, the use of letters of credit that contain boycott-related terms, among others. U.S. persons, a term that covers all individuals, corporations, and unincorporated associations resident in the United States, including the permanent domestic affiliates of foreign concerns, who receive requests to participate in an unsanctioned boycott are required to report the incident to the Office of Antiboycott Compliance (OAC).

In 2018, the United States-China Economic and Security Review Commission began investigating the utility of applying anti-boycott laws to Taiwan to protect US interests in Cross-Strait relations.

Various jurisdictions in the United States has enacted laws against boycotts including Anti-BDS laws and anti-ESG laws. The Federal Trade Commission (FTC) in the second Trump administration restricted Omnicom Group "from engaging in collusion or coordination to direct advertising away from media publishers based on the publishers’ political or ideological viewpoints". Media Matters for America filed a lawsuit over an FTC investigation into the organization organizing an advertiser boycott of Twitter under Elon Musk. Trump signed Executive Order 14331 (Guaranteeing Fair Banking for All Americans) to crack down on "politicized or unlawful debanking". The order states, "It is the policy of the United States that no American should be denied access to financial services because of their constitutionally or statutorily protected beliefs, affiliations, or political views".
