= Arthur Treacher's =

American fast food seafood restaurant chain

Arthur Treacher's Fish and Chips

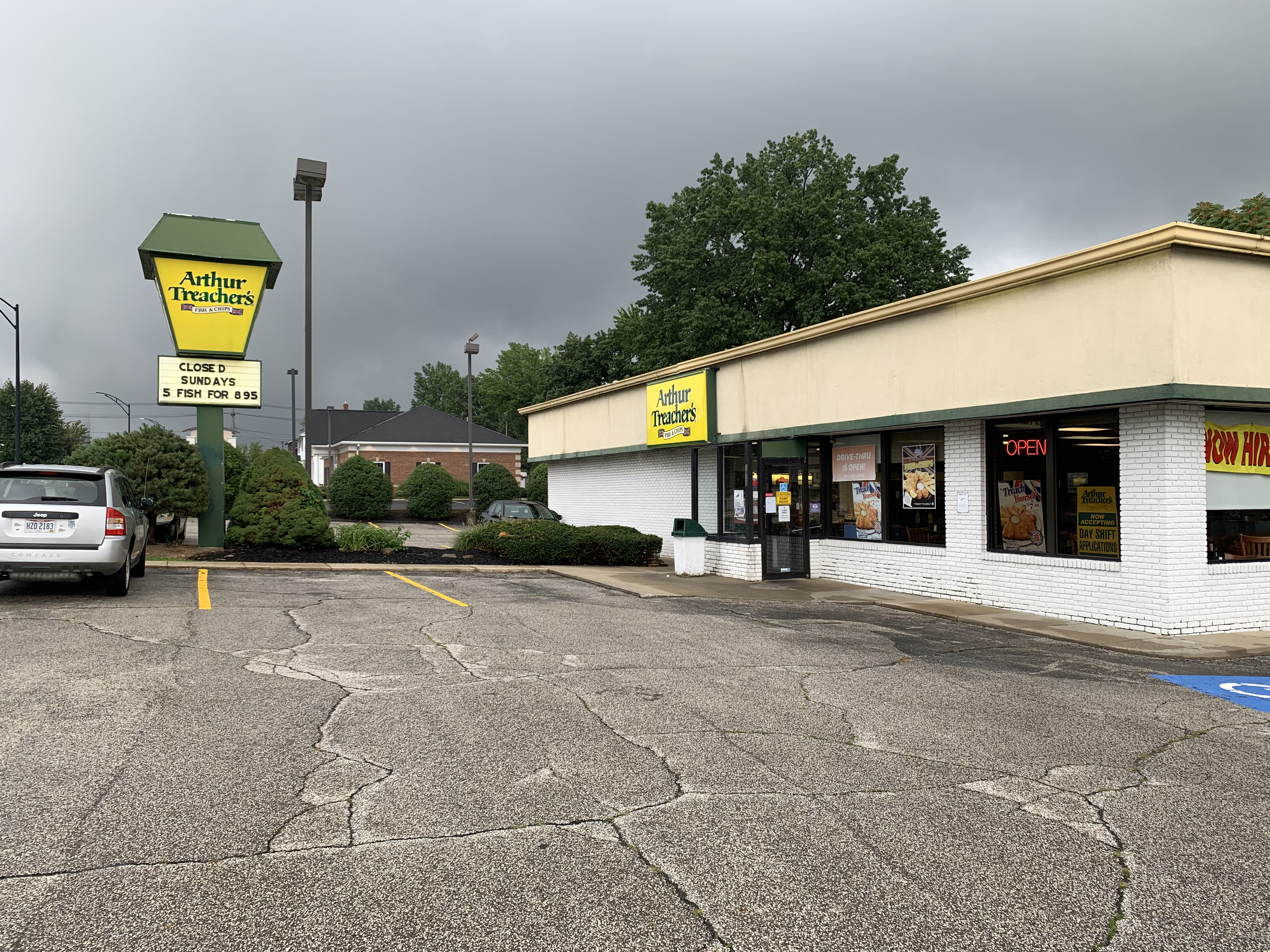
- Arthur Treacher's in Cuyahoga Falls, Ohio. By 2021 (photo) this location was the last in the country.
- Type: Subsidiary of TruFoods Systems, Inc
- Industry: Restaurant
- Founded: 1969; 57 years ago in Columbus, Ohio, US
- Headquarters: New York, U.S.
- Number of locations: 4 stand-alone as of August 2026, plus other embedded stores
- Area served: Ohio and vicinity
- Products: Seafood

Arthur Treacher's Fish & Chips is an American fast food seafood restaurant and restaurant chain that specializes in fish and chips. At the peak of its popularity in the late 1970s, it had 826 stores. As of 2026, there are only four standalone Arthur Treacher's locations remaining, all in northeastern Ohio. The menu typically offers fried seafood or chicken, accompanied by french fries (chips). The fish recipe is authentic, having been purchased from Malin's in Bow, London, the first recorded fish-and-chip shop in England.

== Founding ==
The franchise was established in 1969 in Columbus, Ohio, as National Fast Food Corp. The founders included S. Robert Davis, his friend Dave Thomas (the future founder of Wendy's), and L. S. Hartzog. They were looking to sell authentic British fish and chips. The company investigated the roots of the dish in Bow, London, where in the 1860s Joseph Malin opened the first recorded fish-and-chip shop, called "Malin's in Bow". For over 100 years, the Malin family ran that restaurant until closing in the early 1970s. In 1969, Malin's sold the exclusive rights to their recipe to Arthur Treacher's. The chain kept the same recipe and cooking methods, thus their slogan "the original". At one point in 2021, only one Arthur Treacher's restaurant was left, in Cuyahoga Falls, Ohio, making it the only place in the world that still served the historic recipe.

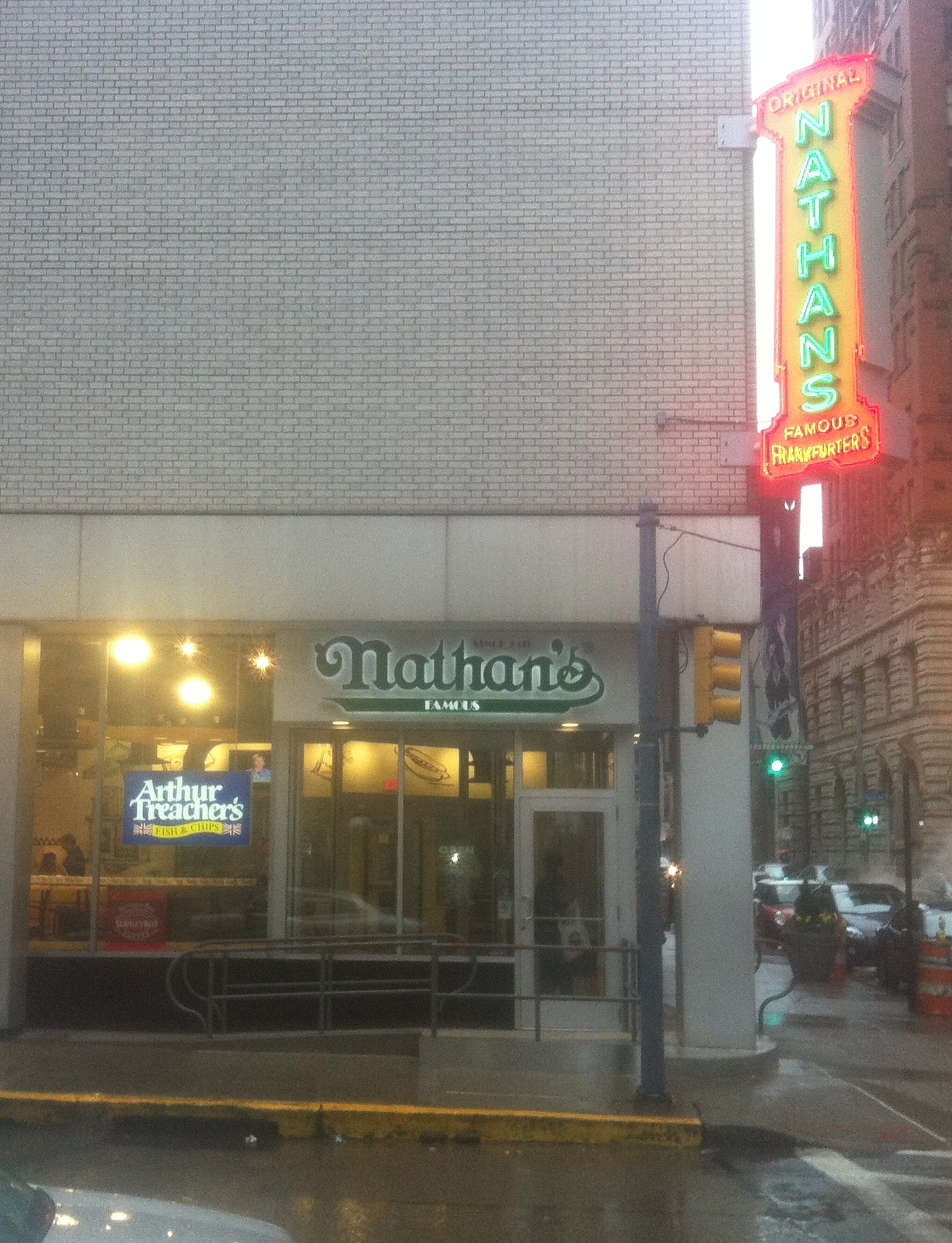
A since-closed Arthur Treacher's co-branded with a Nathan's Famous in downtown Pittsburgh

The chain was also looking for a namesake, so they purchased the rights to Arthur Treacher (1894–1975), an English character actor typecast as "the perfect butler" for his performances as Jeeves, a butler in several Shirley Temple films, in addition to the role of Constable Jones in Mary Poppins. At the time the chain was founded, Treacher was best known as the announcer and sidekick to Merv Griffin on The Merv Griffin Show. Although Treacher never confirmed whether he had a financial involvement in the restaurants, he was "a spokesman for the restaurant chain in its early years, underscoring the British character of its food." Treacher sometimes visited the restaurants, arriving in a red double-decker bus.

== Later mergers ==
=== Fisher Foods ===
In 1970, Fisher Foods swapped capital with and licensed franchises from National, with a total of 550 franchises sold (106 to Fisher alone), but only 99 stores were actually in operation. Long John Silver's, Captain D's, Skipper's and Alfie's Fish & Chips likewise employed the fish franchise concept about the same time. Aided by Arthur Treacher's advertisements, these companies introduced British fish and chips to northeastern America.

=== Orange Co. ===
By the early 1970s, National Fast Food had become Orange Co. Under this name, Davis conducted an aggressive expansion campaign from 1972 through 1976. Lacking equity, he relied on generous sale-leaseback agreements. Under the terms of the agreements, Orange Co. would sell to investors sites for new restaurants and then sign long leases unconditionally guaranteeing to continue lease payments if the restaurants failed.

=== Mrs. Paul's Seafood ===
On November 21, 1979, Orange Co. sold Arthur Treacher's to Mrs. Paul's. However, under the terms of its original sale-leaseback agreements, Orange Co. remained liable for millions of dollars of payments to investors.

The "Cod Wars" between the UK and Iceland over fishing rights in Icelandic waters during the 1970s caused cod prices to double. Mrs. Paul's responded by replacing Icelandic cod in Arthur Treacher's recipe with less expensive pollock. The move exacerbated tensions with franchisees, some of whom had already withheld a total of $5 million in royalties for what they perceived to be a declining level of service. Litigation arising from the conflict eventually reached the United States Court of Appeals for the Third Circuit.

=== Lumara Foods ===
After losing the case to the franchisees and having no way to compensate them, Mrs. Paul's sold Arthur Treacher's to a Youngstown, Ohio, group of investors called Lumara Foods of America Inc. in March 1982. Lumara Foods filed for reorganization under Chapter 11 of the U.S. Bankruptcy Code four months later.

=== Investment group ===
The company was then bought by a group of investors, and the corporate offices were moved to Youngstown. It went into bankruptcy in 1983. Two years later, it was merged into a shell company by Jim Cataland. From 1985 to 1993, Cataland slowly expanded the company again. In 1993, money from a new group of investors headed by Bruce Galloway and Jeffrey Bernstein was used to introduce a more modern seafood concept, to buy additional stores, and to move the company from Youngstown to Jacksonville, Florida.

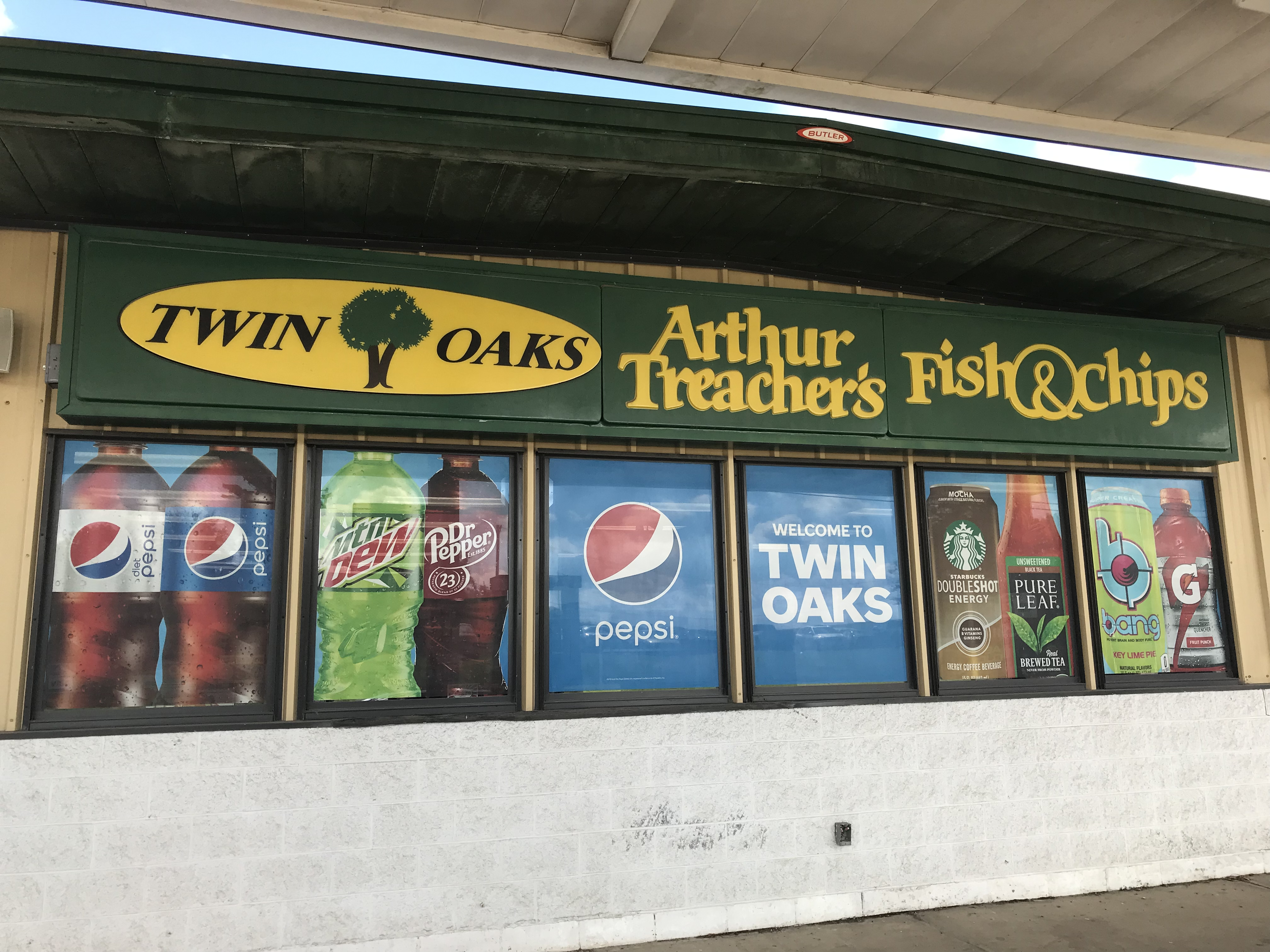
The Twin Oaks Convenience Store in Pomeroy, Ohio, with an attached Arthur Treacher's location. As of 2026, the location is no longer in operation.

In the mid-1980s, franchises in Detroit were converted by their owner to a new chain called Seafood Bay. Arthur Treacher's purchased back six Seafood Bay locations in 1997 but was unsuccessful in reverting them.

The company experimented with co-branding, forming an alliance with Arby's (which originated in the Youngstown suburb of Boardman) for co-branded locations. One such location existed in Breezewood, Pennsylvania. However, by the late 1990s, Arby's parent Triarc Cos. Inc. removed the Arthur Treacher's portions of its co-branded Arby's.

=== PAT Franchise Systems ===
In 2002, the company holding the Arthur Treacher's trademark was acquired by PAT Franchise Systems, a wholly owned subsidiary of TruFoods Systems. In 2006, Nathan's Famous bought the exclusive rights to market the Arthur Treacher's trademark and sell their products, co-branded with Nathan's Own concepts, Kenny Rogers Roasters, and Miami Subs (now Miami Grill). However, PAT Franchise Systems retained a license agreement entitling it to sell Arthur Treacher's Fish and Chips franchises in Ohio, Indiana, Michigan, and Pennsylvania.

According to Ben Vittoria, a former franchise owner in Ohio, "There are a lot of dissimilarities between what Nathan's uses today and what we use, because we continue to use the traditional Arthur Treacher's chicken, shrimp and clams and I don't believe Nathan's is using any of those products. Both use the same batter and hush puppy mix, but Nathan’s uses crinkle-cut fries instead of the original thicker ridged chips."

=== Nathan's Famous ===
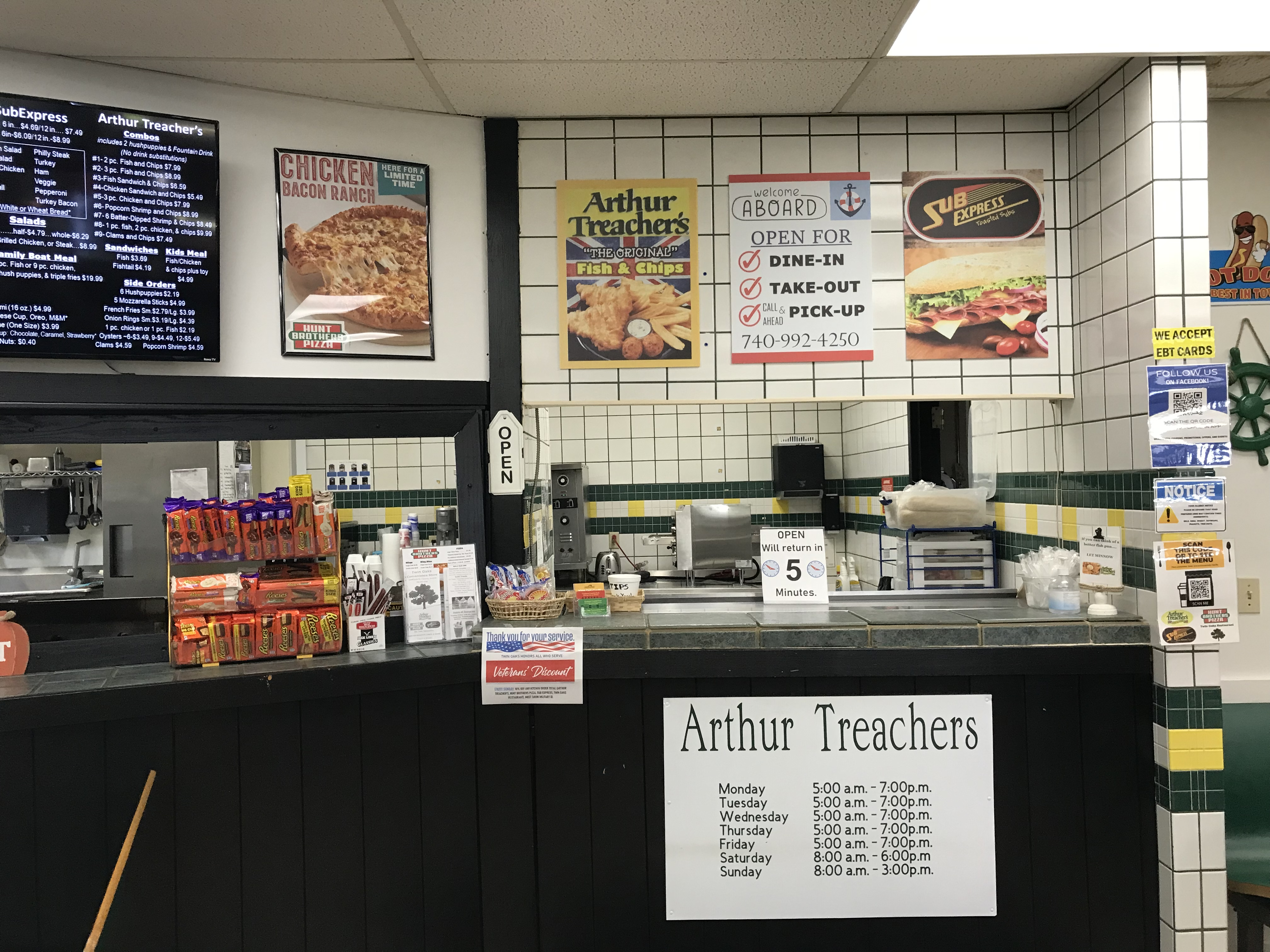
The interior of an Arthur Treacher's in Pomeroy, Ohio

In 2021, Nathan's Famous announced plans to offer Arthur Treacher's branded food nationwide as a ghost kitchen concept only available via food delivery services. James Walker, the senior vice president of restaurants, said, "We think it's a nice combination of historic, storied brand, with new focus on the food.” Some menu items are also available at physical locations, such as the Nathan's at the Trumbull Mall in Trumbull, Connecticut.

== Locations ==
=== Stand-alone ===
Four stand-alone restaurants remain, all in northeast Ohio. The two oldest are in Cuyahoga Falls (est. 1972) and Garfield Heights (est. 1978); the former has remained in continuous operation since its founding. By 2021, it was the last Arthur Treacher's in the country. Ben Vittoria, the Cuyahoga Falls owner, kept the last store alive and indeed without him, the entire franchise would have ceased to operate. In recognition of the restaurant's last stand at Cuyahoga Falls, the town mayor Don Walters designated June 30, 2021, as Arthur Treacher's Day. Customers traveled long distances to relive memories of youth and made the town a food destination. A map on the wall allowed diners to leave a pin where they came from. On April 1, 2025, a third location opened in Cleveland Heights, and a fourth had its grand opening in Lakewood on August 26, 2026.

=== Embedded ===
In addition to the Ohio stand-alone locations, four Salvatore's Pizzerias in Rochester, New York, have embedded Arthur Treacher's franchises. The Twin Oaks Convenience Store in Pomeroy, Ohio, has an Arthur Treacher's sharing kitchen space with a Hunt Brothers Pizza and a Sub Express. As of 2026, it no longer operates under the Arthur Treacher's name. In East Islip, New York, a small strip-mall store has a combination Pudgie's and Arthur Treacher's. There is an Arthur Treacher's embedded in the airport passenger terminal at Naval Station Rota in Rota, Spain.

== Influence ==
Playwright August Wilson wrote the Tony Award-winning Jitney while dining at a Arthur Treacher's in Pittsburgh, Pennsylvania.

== See also ==
- List of fish and chip restaurants
- List of seafood restaurants
- Pie and mash
