= Andy Unanue =

American businessman

- Born: July 3, 1967 (age 59); New Jersey, U.S.
- Education: University of Miami (B.B.A.); Thunderbird School of Global Management (M.B.A.)
- Occupations: Businessman, investor
- Title: Managing Partner, AUA Private Equity Partners. Former Chief Operating Officer of Goya Foods.
- Political party: Republican
- Parent(s): Joseph A. Unanue, Carmen Ana Casal

Andy Unanue (born July 3, 1967) is an American businessman and investor. He is the current Managing Partner of AUA Private Equity Partners, an operationally focused, lower middle-market private equity firm that targets Hispanic-oriented and family-owned companies. Unanue is the former Chief Operating Officer of the family-owned Goya Foods, the largest Hispanic-owned food company in the United States.

In 2008, he flirted with the idea of announcing of his candidacy for the Republican nomination for the U.S. Senate seat in New Jersey. He briefly entered the race but dropped out after four days, designating former Congressman Dick Zimmer to run in his place.

== Early life and education ==
Unanue was born and raised in Bogota, New Jersey. He is the grandson of Goya Foods' founders, Spaniards Prudencio Unanue Ortiz and Carolina Casal de Valdés, and son of Joseph A. Unanue and Carmen Ana Casal (1934–2021). He attended St. Joseph School in Bogota and Alpine Public School. He attended Bergen Catholic High School.

Unanue received a bachelor's degree from the University of Miami and an MBA from Thunderbird, the American Graduate School of International Management.

== Career ==
He began working in his father's company in their Miami office, working his way up to President of Goya de Santo Domingo. After his brother Joseph F. Unanue died of myelodysplastic syndrome in 1998, he became Executive Vice President. Unanue became Goya's COO in 1999.

In February 2004, Unanue left Goya to establish a family office. Through his family office AU & Associates, LLC, he has made investments in companies such as Opt-Intelligence, Inc., BigFish Games, Inc. and eSchoolData, LLC. He was also a former Operating Executive of Palladium Equity Partners.

In August 2007, Unanue formed Trufoods LLC, which now owns the franchises Wall Street Deli, Arthur Treacher's Fish & Chips, Ritter's Frozen Custard, and Pudgie's Famous Chicken.

In October 2010, he married Marie O'Mara in Mayakoba, Mexico.

== Candidacy for United States Senate ==
In 2008, Unanue was briefly a Republican primary candidate to face incumbent Frank Lautenberg in that year's U.S. Senate election. Unanue announced his candidacy after the withdrawal of moderate Republican Anne Evans Estabrook, who was initially the New Jersey GOP establishment's choice but quit the race due to a mini-stroke. Unanue was reportedly considering dropping out of the Senate race to make way for Princeton biotechnology executive John Crowley, but after Crowley signaled that he would not run, Unanue announced that he had filed petitions for the race on April 7, 2008. However, on April 11, Unanue dropped out of the race, and his committee on vacancies designated former Congressman Dick Zimmer to enter the race under the Unanue petitions.

== AUA Private Equity Partners ==
In April 2012, Unanue officially announced the formation of AUA Private Equity Partners by partnering with the former principals of Gotham Private Equity Partners, L.P., who integrated their operations into AUA Equity. Unanue and Gotham had been working together for over 3 years. AUA Private Equity Partners is an operationally focused, lower middle-market private equity firm. The firm invests primarily in companies in the consumer, media and business services sectors, with a particular focus on Hispanic-oriented companies and family-owned businesses located in the United States. AUA Private Equity Partners manages five portfolio companies, including Two-Twenty Records Management, LLC, a records information management business and Brighter Dental Solutions LLC, a regional dental practice management company.
