= Pudgie's =

American fast food restaurant chain

Pudgie's Famous Chicken
- Company type: Subsidiary of TruFoods Systems, Inc
- Industry: Restaurant
- Founded: 1981; 45 years ago in Bethpage, New York, U.S.
- Headquarters: Jacksonville, Florida, U.S.
- Products: Fried chicken
- Website: Pudgies.com NakedChickenCo.com

Pudgie's Famous Chicken, often referred as simply Pudgie's, is a chain of fast food restaurants. Competing with KFC and Popeyes, many locations today are co-branded with Nathan's Famous, many of which are also co-branded with sister chain Arthur Treacher's, and have several locations in the New York metropolitan area. It is famous for its skinless fried chicken products and for their signature fried chicken having 25% less fat than traditional fried chicken.

== History ==
Pudgie's Famous Chicken was founded in 1981 in Bethpage, New York, by George Sanders, who developed a secret batter recipe and skinning process. This concept was spread throughout Long Island and by 1989 Pudgie's became a franchise company. TruFoods Systems, Inc., bought the trademark in 2002, and as of 2011, TruFoods operates the Wall St. Deli, Ritter's Frozen Custard, Arthur Treacher's, and Pudgie's. Today, this concept is exclusive to Nathan's Famous, and as such, many of these are cobranded with Nathan's.

On July 21, 2014, the first rebranded "Pudgie's Naked Chicken Co." opened in Massapequa, New York. TruFoods President, Gary Occhiogrosso, said he is reinventing the Pudgie's brand which still offers skinless fried chicken but also offers fresher ingredients. Its menu has been modernized to spotlight what Ochiogrosso called “grilled and healthier options." Nothing is frozen, and all items — including fries and roasted vegetables — are freshly prepared, as much to order as possible.

As of November 2018, there were only three Pudgie's Famous Chicken restaurants open. They are located in East Islip, Selden and West Islip. Pudgie's Naked Chicken Co. last location in Massapequa closed in July 2016.

== See also ==
- List of fast-food chicken restaurants
