= Edward Piszek =

American businessman (1916–2004)

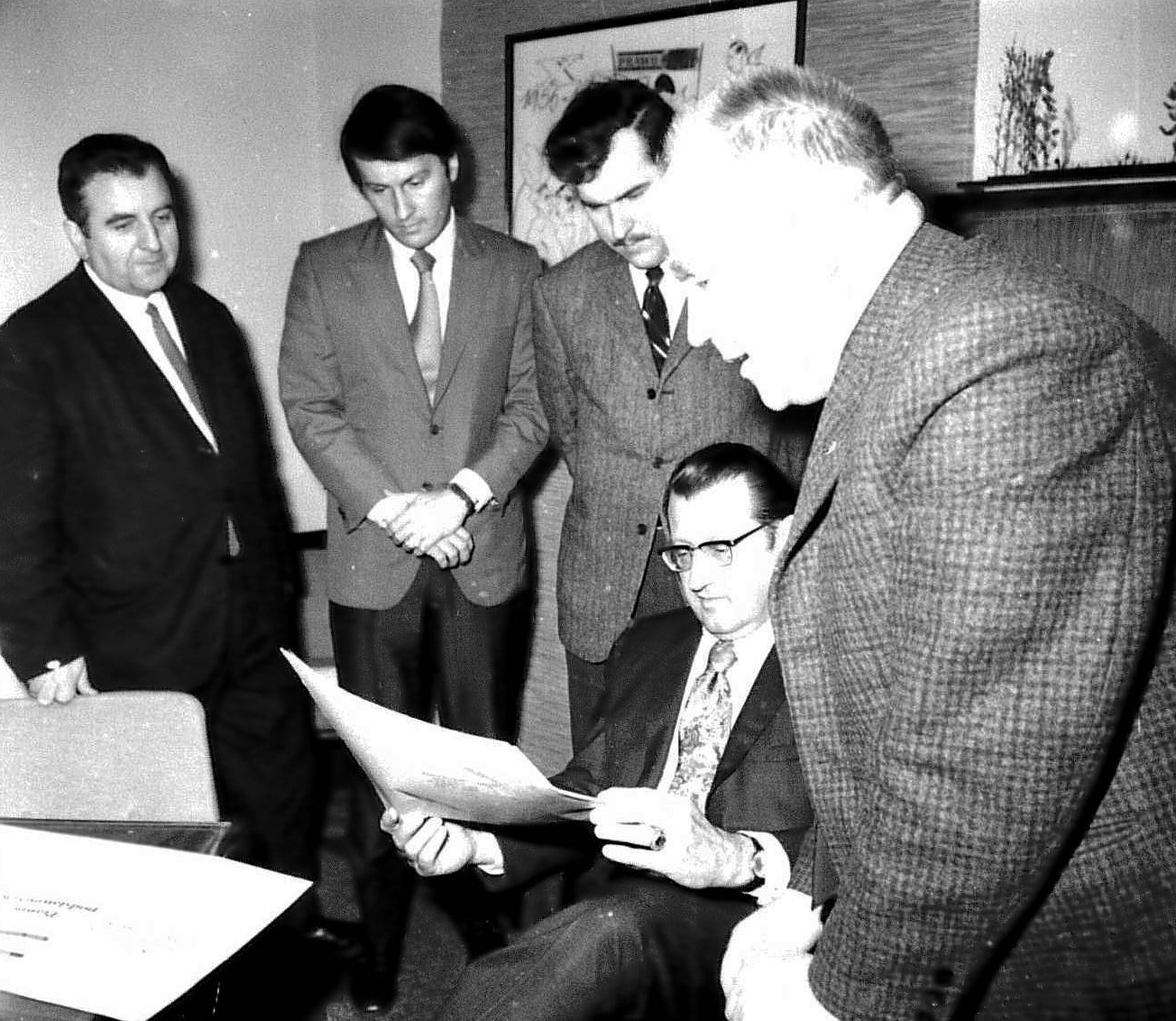
- Piszek (seated) in 1971
- Born: Edward John Piszczek; October 24, 1916; Chicago, Illinois, US
- Died: March 17, 2004 (aged 87); Emlen House, Fort Washington, Pennsylvania, US
- Other names: The Fishcake King; The Big Fishcake; The Polish Ben Franklin
- Education: Wharton School of the University of Pennsylvania (business administration)
- Occupation: Businessman
- Spouse: Olga Pauline McFadden (d. 1993)
- Children: 5
- Awards: J.E. Bi-Centennial Caldwell Award

Edward John Piszek (pronounced PEE-zeck; 24 October 1916 – 27 March 2004) co-founded the Mrs. Paul's frozen foods brand with John Paul, a bread salesman. Piszek bought out his partner in the 1950s.

Among Piszek's philanthropy was acquiring and restoring the Philadelphia house where Tadeusz Kościuszko lived as well as the adjoining property to become the Thaddeus Kosciuszko National Memorial.

== Career ==
Piszek was the son of Peter and Anna (Sikora) Piszek. Both of his parents came from Poland, but he did not learn the language. His family moved from Chicago to a farm near Quakertown, Pennsylvania, and then to Philadelphia, where his father opened a grocery store. He later earned a degree in business administration by attending the Wharton School of the University of Pennsylvania in the evenings. He received a B.B.A. from Wharton in 1940.

One of his early jobs was as a salesman for Campbell Soup. Piszek came up with the idea of selling frozen fish in 1946 when he was on strike from his job at the General Electric plant in Philadelphia. Philadelphia, and when his union went on strike in 1946, he partnered with a friend to make and deliver crab cakes to local establishments. One week, after making too many crab cakes, he froze them for later sale, and discovered a profitable business plan. The seeds of a frozen seafood empire were planted. The Mrs. Paul's brand of frozen seafood took off, and in the 1950s, Edward bought out the company from his business partner but kept the Mrs. Paul's name.

== Mrs. Paul's ==
Piszek and his friend John Paul each contributed $350 to start a frozen seafood business in 1946. It was named after Paul's mother and the company continued as Mrs. Paul's Kitchens even after Piszek bought out his partner in the 1950s.

It was successful in producing a large number of frozen fish products under the Mrs. Paul's brand. Piszek was an activist on issues affecting Poland and this also helped the company by him being able to obtain low prices for raw fish from Polish suppliers.

The company suffered after Piszek bought Arthur Treacher's Fish and Chips in 1979. Arthur Treacher's franchisees refused to buy products from Piszek's company or pay it royalties, resulting in costly litigation. Another problem impacted Mrs. Paul's during the early 1980s was the disruption of its supply chain because of the imposition of martial law in Poland.

In 1984 Campbell's acquired the Philadelphia headquartered Mrs. Paul's Kitchens for an undisclosed price. At that time, the privately held company was the largest producer of frozen fish products in the U.S. with about 25% of the frozen fish market and $124 million in sales in 1981.

He wrote a book, Some Good in the World: A Life of Purpose.

== Philanthropy ==
He gave millions to battle tuberculosis in Poland.

For the 500th anniversary of Copernicus's birth in 1973, Piszek established the Copernicus Society of America in Pennsylvania as an independent foundation to support and advance Polish culture and heritage.

He bought the Philadelphia house where Tadeusz Kościuszko, the Polish statesman who aided the American Revolution, once lived, restored it, and donated it to the National Park Service. Piszek also bought and donated the house next door for additional exhibit space. These are now part of Independence National Historical Park.

His donations to Little League Baseball in Poland made Kutno, Poland, the league's European training center.

He befriended Cardinal Karol Wojtyla of Kraków before he became Pope John Paul II.

He was a member of Gore 2000.

== Sources ==
- Martin, Douglas (30 March 2004). "Edward J. Piszek, 87, Dies; Founded Mrs. Paul's Brand". The New York Times. pp. C15.
- Strybel, Robert. "The Story of a True Pol-Am Philanthropist". Polish American Journal. Archived from the original on 20 May 2016.
- Hinds, Michael Decourcy (12 July 1993). "Already Shaky Area Losing Key Pillar: Mrs. Paul's". The New York Times.
