= Nathan's Famous =

Fast food restaurant chain

Nathan's Famous, Inc.
- Company logo

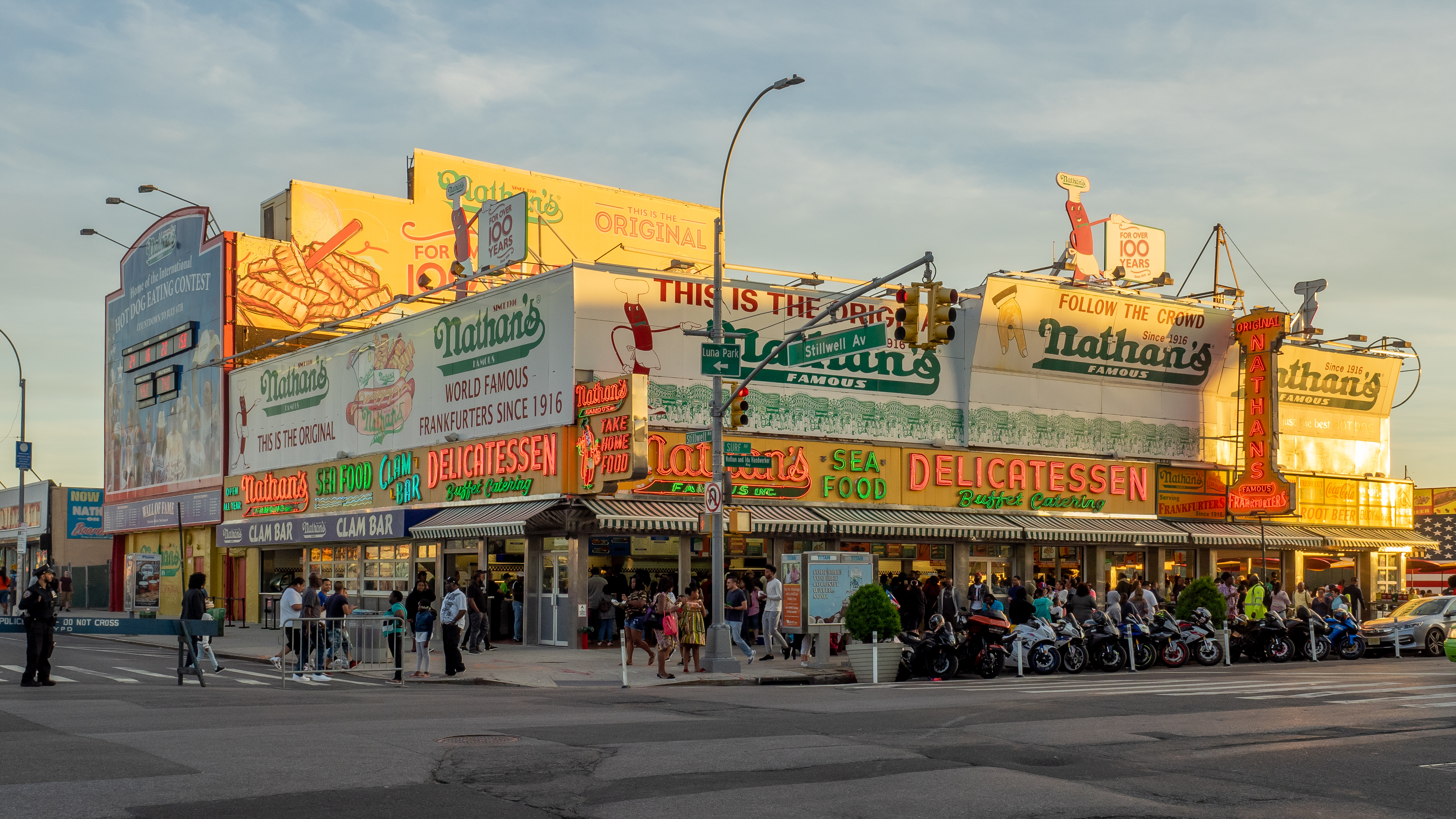
- The original Coney Island branch of Nathan's Famous
- Type: Public
- Traded as: Nasdaq: NATH; Russell 2000 component
- Industry: Food
- Founded: 1916 (110 years ago) in Brooklyn, New York City, U.S.
- Founders: Nathan Handwerker; Ida Handwerker
- Headquarters: Jericho, New York, U.S.
- Number of locations: 198 (January 2022)
- Area served: United States, Brazil, Canada, Dominican Republic, Ireland, Kazakhstan, Malaysia, Mexico, Panama, Philippines, Saudi Arabia, Spain, Ukraine, United Kingdom, United Arab Emirates
- Key people: Howard M. Lorber (executive chairman); Eric Gatoff (CEO); Wayne Norbitz (president and COO)
- Products: Hot dogs, hamburgers, cheesesteaks, onion rings, meatball heros, chicken, milkshakes
- Services: Fast-food restaurants Retail brand Franchising
- Revenue: ▲US$103.325 million (FY 2020)
- Operating income: ▼US$27.172 million (FY 2020)
- Net income: ▼US$13.435 million (FY 2020)
- Total assets: ▲US$105.282 million (FY 2020)
- Total equity: ▼US$-66,401 million (FY 2020)
- Number of employees: 13,044 (2021)
- Website: nathansfamous.com

Nathan's Famous, Inc., is an American company that operates a chain of fast-food restaurants specializing in hot dogs. The original Nathan's restaurant stands at the corner of Surf and Stillwell Avenues in the Coney Island neighborhood of Brooklyn, New York City. Its restaurants are primarily in the Northeastern United States. The company's headquarters are at One Jericho Plaza in Jericho, part of Oyster Bay, New York.

In January 2026, it was announced that Nathan's Famous had agreed to be bought by Smithfield Foods in a $450 million, all-cash transaction.

== History ==
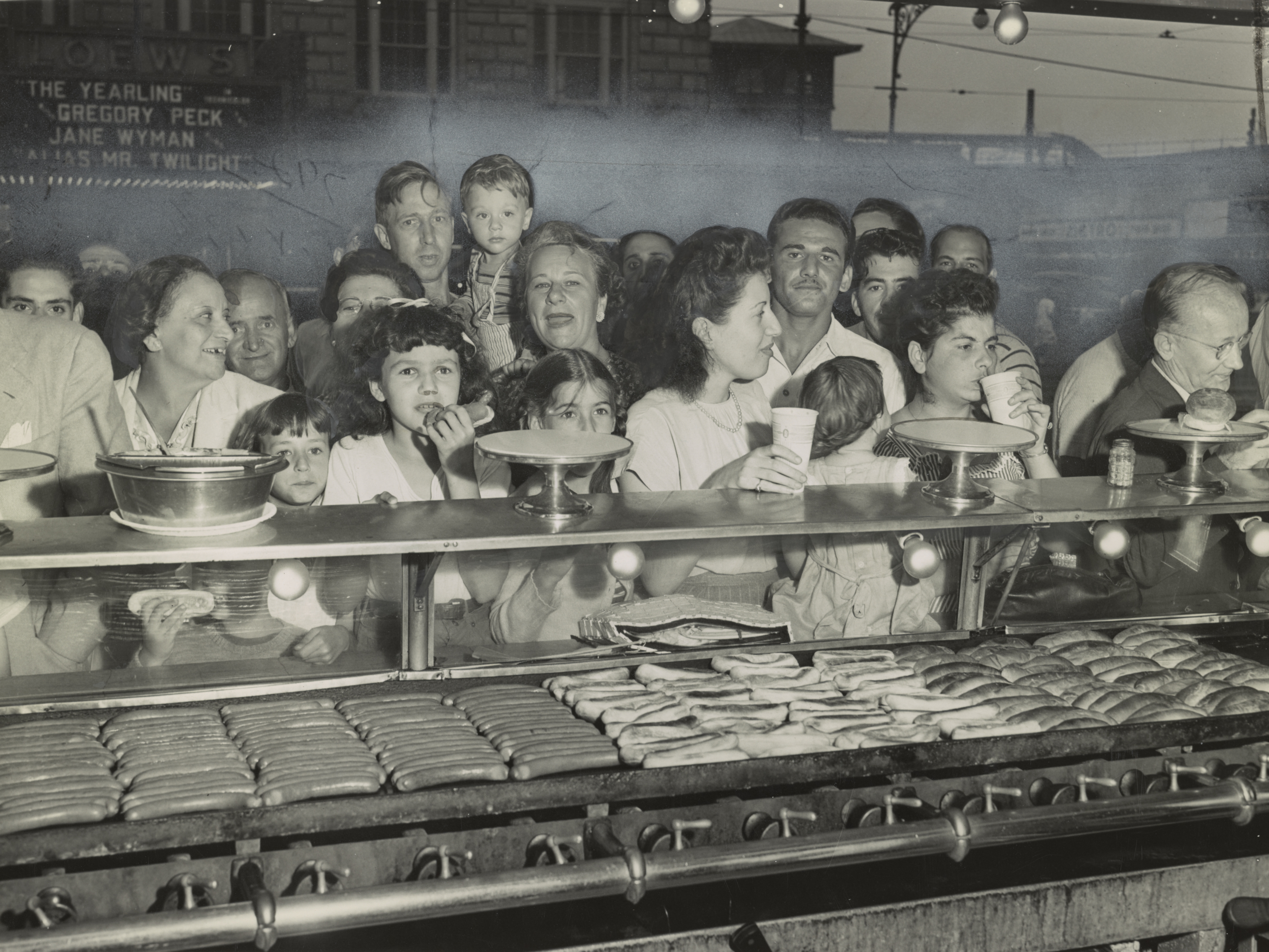
Crowding customers in 1947

Nathan Handwerker (1892–1974) was a Jewish-Polish immigrant who arrived in New York City in 1912 and soon found work at the Coney Island, Brooklyn, restaurant Feltman's German Gardens. By one account, he was encouraged by singing waiters Eddie Cantor and Jimmy Durante to go into business in competition with Feltman's; as United Press International noted in 1974, "There are many stories about Nathan and how the business began, but this is the way he told it..." The company's official history does not mention the future stars' encouragement. Nathan and his wife, Ida Handwerker, née Greenwald, spent their life savings of $300 (equivalent to about $8,876 today) to begin the business together.

Nathan's began as a nickel hot dog stand in Coney Island in 1916. Ida created the hot dog recipe they used, and Ida's grandmother created the secret spice recipe. Because Nathan's Famous all-beef hot dogs lacked rabbinic supervision and the meat wasn't kosher, Handwerker coined the term "kosher style" because the hot dogs were not made from pork or horse meat.

Handwerker undercut Feltman's by charging five cents for a hot dog when his former employer was charging 10 cents. At a time when food regulation was in its infancy and the pedigree of the hot dog particularly suspect, Handwerker ensured that men wearing surgeon's smocks were seen eating at his stand to reassure potential customers. The business proved immensely popular.

The expansion of the chain was overseen by Nathan Handwerker's son, Murray Handwerker. A second branch on Long Beach Road in Oceanside, New York, opened in 1959, and another debuted in Yonkers, New York, in 1965. Murray Handwerker was named the president of Nathan's Famous in 1968, the year the company went public.

All locations were sold by the Handwerker family to a group of private investors in 1987, at which point Nathan's was franchised and a great number of establishments were opened around New York City and beyond. In the 1990s, the company acquired Kenny Rogers Roasters and Miami Subs Grill, both of which were later divested.

In 2002, Home Depot and Nathan's terminated a co-locating partnership which offered Nathan's space within certain Home Depot stores in New York.

International master franchise agreements were signed (c. 2006) with Egypt and Israel. The company also owns the exclusive co-branding rights to the Arthur Treacher's Fish and Chips chain.

On March 28, 2017, Major League Baseball announced that it had reached a sponsorship deal with Nathan's Famous, allowing the company to market itself as the official hot dog brand of the league. While Nathan's was already the official hot dog brand of the New York Mets, New York Yankees, Miami Marlins, and St. Louis Cardinals (the sponsorship does not restrict teams from making similar deals with competitors), the deal marked the first time that Major League Baseball had named an official hot dog sponsor.

Nathan's hot dogs are primarily manufactured by Smithfield Foods, a subsidiary of China's WH Group. Nathan's Hot Dogs can also be found in stores for retail sale, usually in the lunch meat aisle.

On January 21, 2026, Nathan's Famous announced that it had been sold to Smithfield Foods for $450 million. Smithfield will acquire all outstanding shares of the company, effectively taking it private. The acquisition is expected to be completed in the first half of 2026.

=== Original location ===
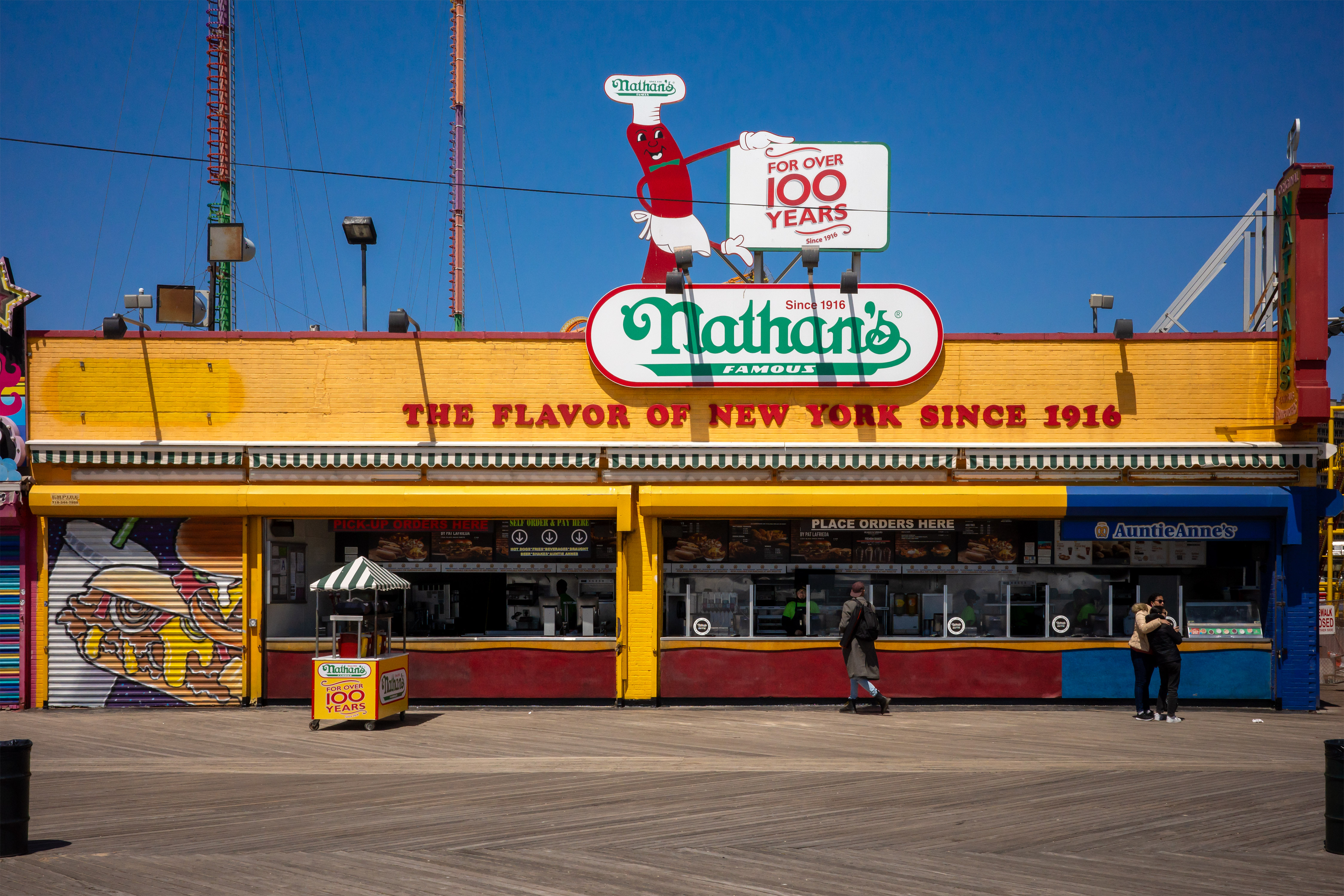
Nathan's Famous smaller location on Riegelmann Boardwalk

As of 2025, the original Nathan's hot dog stand still exists at its original 1916 site. Having been open for business every day, 365 days a year, the stand was forced to close on October 29, 2012, due to Hurricane Sandy. The shop re-opened six months later, on May 21, 2013, despite a small fire on May 4. Service is provided year-round inside, and during the summer additional walk-up windows are opened to serve the larger seasonal crowds. The original location still features fried frog legs, which have been a Nathan's menu item since the 1950s. The item is not offered at any other Nathan's location.

=== Hot dog eating contest ===
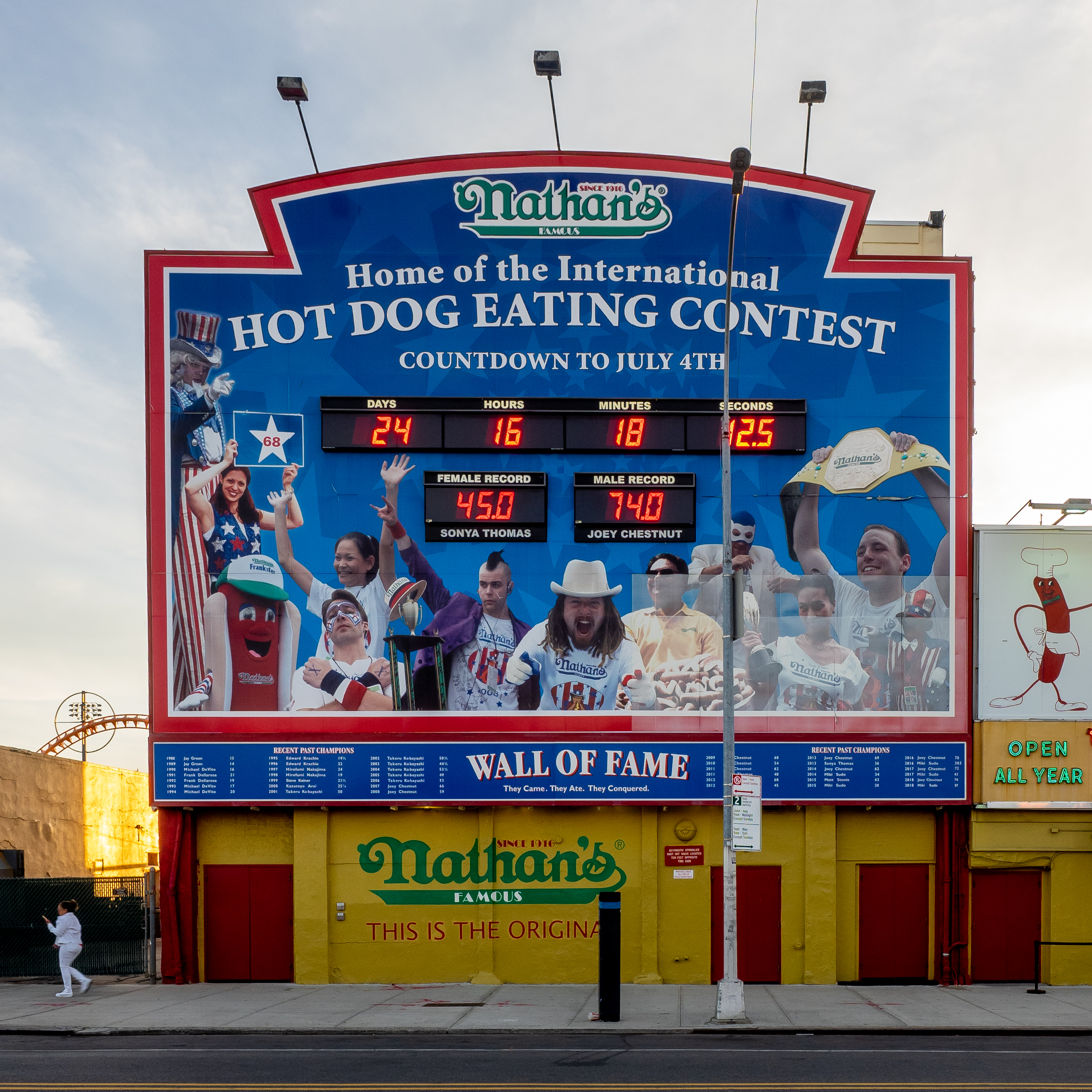
Nathan's Hot Dog Eating Contest countdown clock

The Nathan's Hot Dog Eating Contest has been held annually at the original location on Coney Island since the early 1970s on the 4th of July. Contestants try to consume as many hot dogs as possible in 10 minutes. Winners include Takeru Kobayashi (2001–2006), Joey Chestnut (2007–2014, 2016–2023, 2025) and Miki Sudo (women's 2014–2020, 2022–2025). In 2008, Chestnut tied Kobayashi after eating 59 hot dogs and buns in 10 minutes. The tie resulted in a five-hot-dog eat-off, which Chestnut won by consuming all five before Kobayashi. In 2018, Chestnut consumed 74 hot dogs and buns for a new world record.

== See also ==
- Coney Island hot dog
- Kosher style
- List of Ashkenazi Jewish restaurants
- List of hot dog restaurants
- List of New York companies
