= Unanue, La Pampa =

Coordinates: 37°32′S 64°21′W

Unanue (La Pampa)
- Rural locality and village
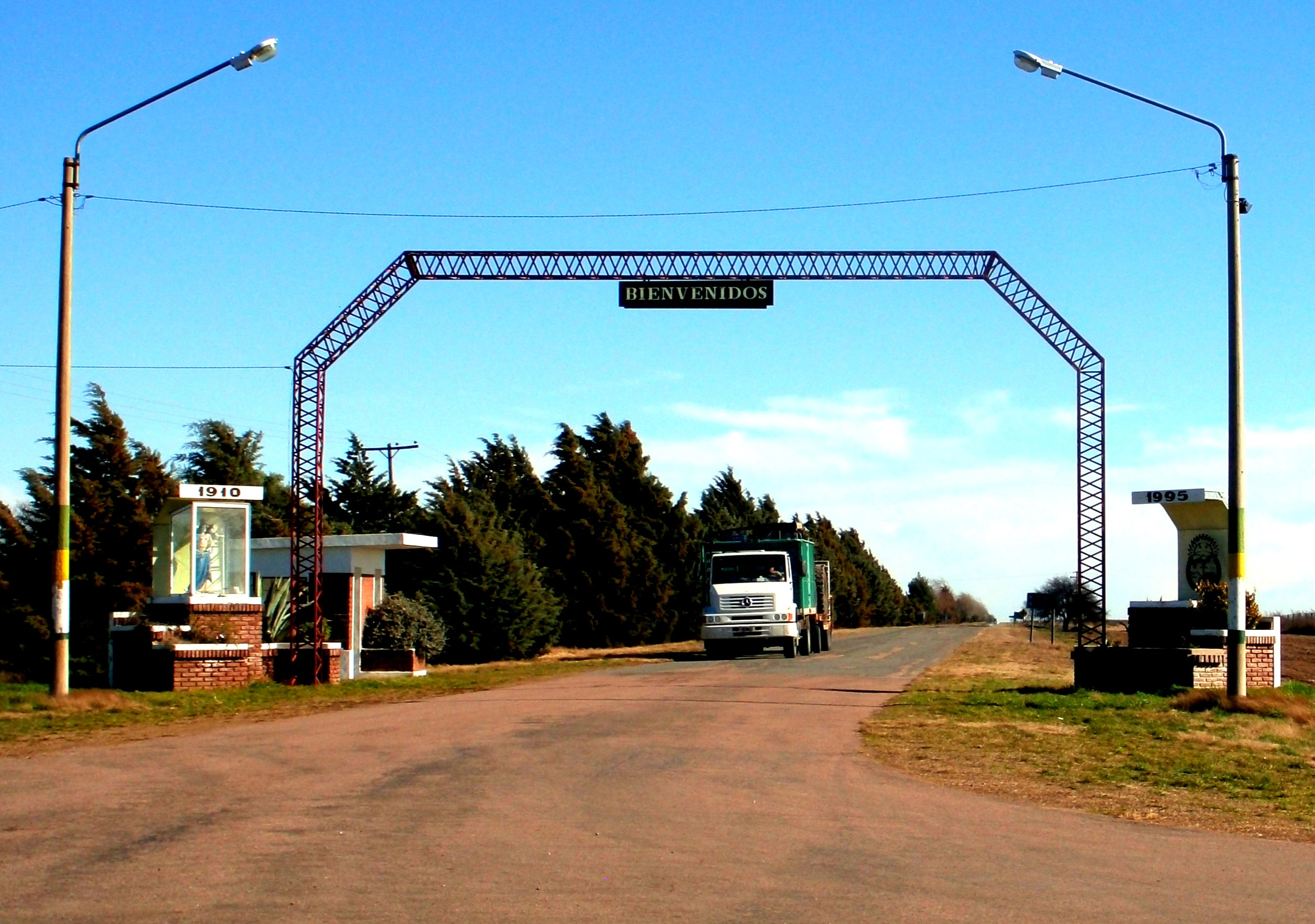
- Interactive map of Unanue (La Pampa)
- Country: Argentina
- Province: La Pampa Province
- Time zone: UTC−3 (ART)

Unanue (La Pampa) is a village and rural locality (municipality) in La Pampa Province in Argentina.
