= Joseph A. Unanue =

American businessman

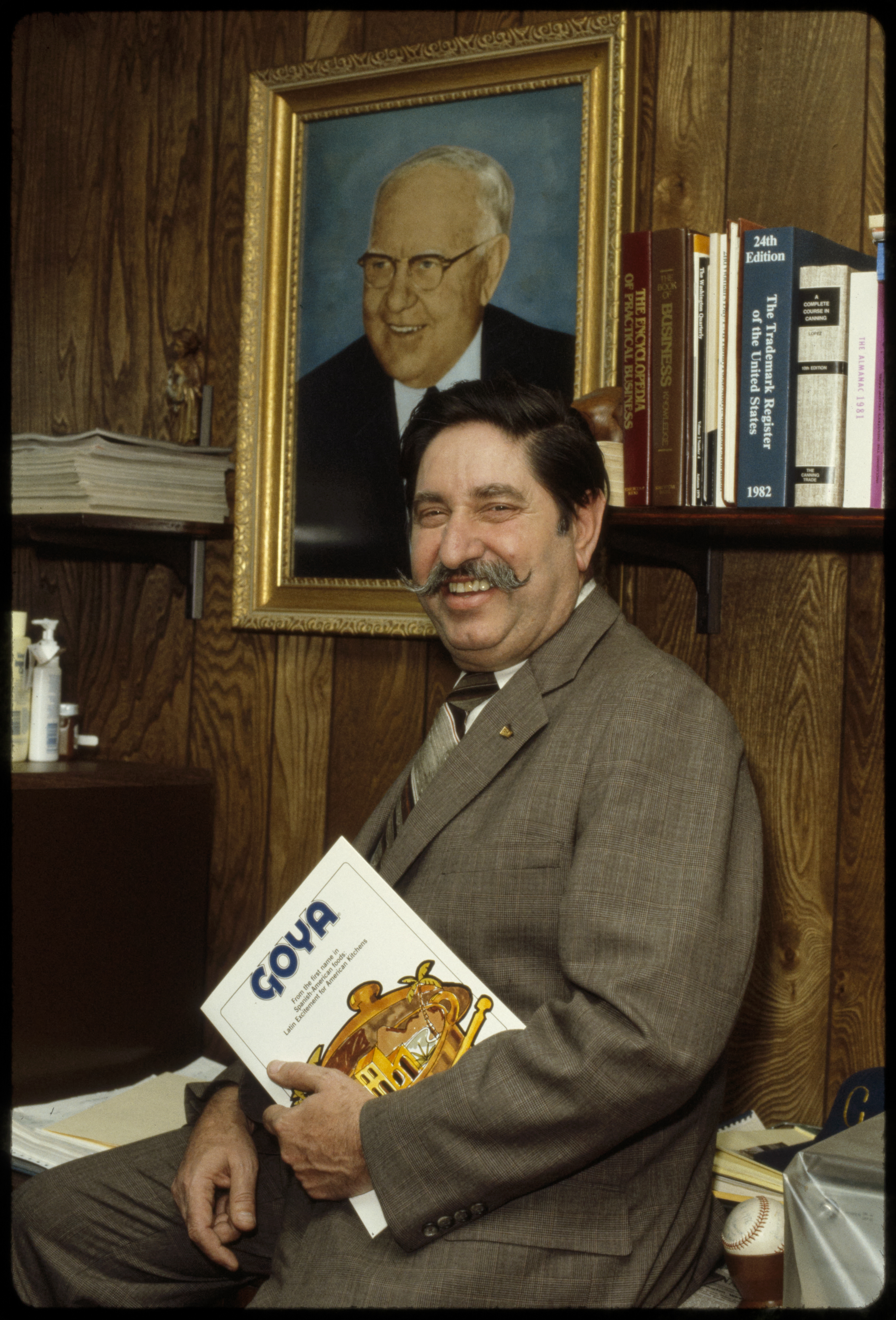
- Joseph A. Unanue in 1982
- Born: March 14, 1925; Brooklyn, New York
- Died: June 12, 2013 (aged 88); Alpine, New Jersey
- Spouse: Carmen Ana Casal
- Children: 6, including Andy Unanue
- Relatives: Prudencio Unanue (father); Carolina Casal (mother)
- Military career
- Allegiance: United States of America
- Branch: United States Army
- Service years: 1943–1946
- Rank: Sergeant
- Units: 63rd Armored Infantry Battalion, 11th Armored Division
- Conflicts: World War II * Battle of the Bulge
- Awards: Bronze Star; World War II Victory Medal
- Other work: Former president of Goya Foods

Joseph Andrew Unanue (March 14, 1925 – June 12, 2013) was an American businessman and president of Goya Foods, the largest Hispanic–owned food company in the United States.

== Early years ==
Unanue's father, Prudencio Unanue Ortiz, was born in Villasana de Mena, in the province of Burgos, in northern Spain. He emigrated to Puerto Rico, where he met a young Spanish girl by the name of Carolina Casal, whose parents also had immigrated to Puerto Rico from Galicia. They were married in the island in 1921 and soon after moved to New York City and settled in Brooklyn where Joseph was born.

Prudencio Unanue worked as a broker for Spanish companies doing business in the U.S. He soon realized that there was a need for Hispanic products in New York City, and in 1936 he founded Goya Foods, a food distributing company, in Manhattan.

Prudencio Unanue was very serious about his children's education and enrolled them in Catholic schools. Joseph attended St. Joseph's Grammar School and later St. Cecilia's High School. Since childhood and when not in school, Unanue and his brothers had to work in the family business. His special job was bottling all over olives. In 1943, he graduated from high school but, since World War II was in full swing, he was drafted into the United States Army.

== World War II ==
After basic training, Unanue attended the University of Puget Sound in Tacoma, Washington. Due to the intensity of the war, he was soon sent to the battlefield. In 1944, his Army company landed in France and soon joined General George S. Patton's 3rd Army at the Battle of the Bulge. Unanue was only 19 years old and a Private First Class when his sergeant died in action. He was then named sergeant in the field and made platoon leader. Unanue pulled his men to safety and was awarded the Bronze Star for bravery.

== Goya Foods ==
In 1946, after Unanue returned home, he enrolled in The Catholic University of America in Washington, D.C., where he graduated with a degree in mechanical engineering. He joined the family business, together with his brothers Tony and Frank Unanue. He learned every facet of the food industry. At first, the major supermarkets, such as A&P and Safeway were not interested in selling anything with the Hispanic demography in mind. Eventually, with the wave of Hispanic immigrants landing in the United States, the supermarket industry started to take notice. Goya Foods started to supply Safeway's Supermarket in Harlem and the rest soon followed.

Unanue married Carmen Ana Casal (1934–2021), his maternal first cousin, in 1956. Casal was an art collector and philanthropist. They had six children and 16 grandchildren.

In 1976, Unanue was named president of the company, whose principal base of operations was by then in New Jersey. His brother Frank ran Goya de Puerto Rico, Inc., located in Bayamon, Puerto Rico. Under Joseph's leadership, the company became the largest Hispanic–owned food distributor in the United States, with sales of over $800 million a year and with over 2,000 employees. Goya Foods grew to have more than a dozen facilities in the continental United States, while affiliated companies operate in Puerto Rico, the Dominican Republic, and Spain.

In 1985, Unanue's son Joseph F. Unanue was named Vice President of Operations, a position he held until 1998 when he died of cancer. His younger son, Andy Unanue, was named to replace Joseph F. Unanue.

== Later years ==
Unanue was made a knight of the Order of Malta and awarded several honorary doctorates.

In February 2004, after 27 years as president of Goya Foods, 78-year-old Joseph and his son Andy were ousted from the company by Joseph's two nephews. Joseph resided in Alpine, New Jersey with his wife Carmen Ana and continued to participate in civic and cultural activities.

In 2008, his son Andy was briefly a candidate for the Republican nomination for a U.S. Senate seat in New Jersey. He announced his candidacy on March 23, 2008, and filed petitions for the race on April 7, 2008. He dropped out of the race four days later and his committee on vacancies designated former Congressman Dick Zimmer to enter the race under the Unanue petitions.

He died of complications of pulmonary fibrosis in 2013.

== Legacy ==
One of Unahue's distinctions was a knighthood in the Order of Malta. He was presented with the key to the city of Boston, Massachusetts. In 1991 he was presented with the National Hispanic Achievement Award, and was twice named the "Man of the Year" by the National Conference of Christians and Jews. The National Suppliers Association presented him with the Leadership Award.

Unanue received honorary doctorates from Mercy College and Long Island University in New York, and from Felician College in New Jersey. The Catholic University of America named one of its campus houses "The Joseph Unanue House".

== Military awards and decorations ==
Among Unanue's decorations are the following:

- Bronze Star
- American Defense Service Medal
- American Campaign Medal
- World War II Victory Medal

== See also ==
- Unanue family
- List of Puerto Ricans
- Spanish American
