= Goya Foods =

American producer of foods sold in the US and many Hispanic countries

Goya Foods, Inc.
- "If it's Goya, it has to be good" Si es Goya, tiene que ser bueno

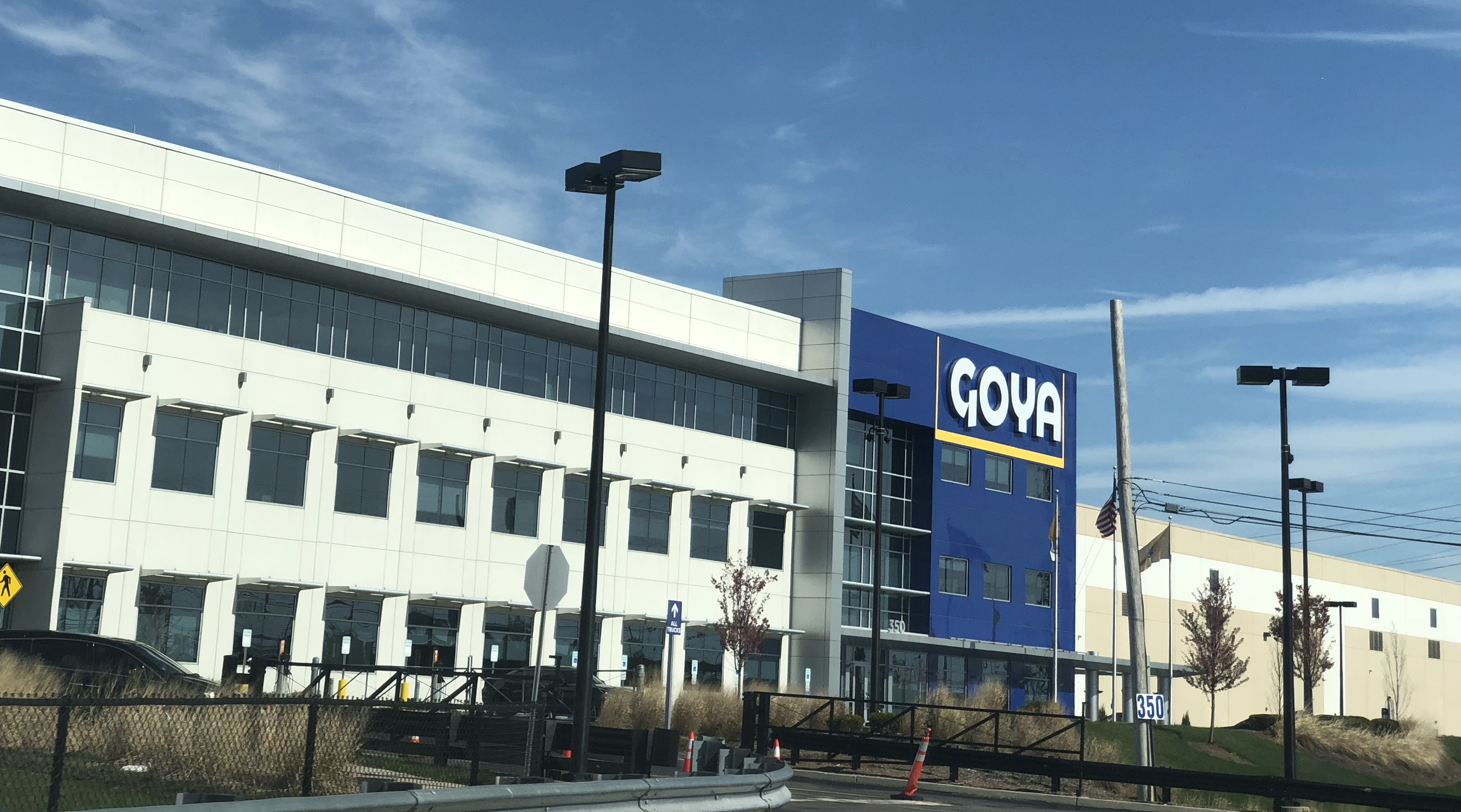
- Goya Headquarters (Jersey City, 2018)
- Type: Private
- Industry: Food industry
- Founded: 1936; 90 years ago in New York City
- Founders: Prudencio Unanue Ortiz
- Headquarters: Jersey City, New Jersey, U.S.
- Area served: United States; Dominican Republic; Puerto Rico; Spain
- Key people: Robert Unanue (former CEO)
- Products: Spanish and Latin American cuisine
- Revenue: $1.5 billion
- Owner: Unanue Family
- Number of employees: 4,000
- Website: www.goya.com

Goya Foods, Inc., is a private American multinational producer and distributor of foods and beverages sold in the United States and many Spanish-speaking countries. The company operates facilities in the United States, Puerto Rico, the Dominican Republic, and Spain. It is under third-generation ownership of the Spanish-American Unanue family and is headquartered in Jersey City, New Jersey.

The company was founded in 1936 by Prudencio Unanue Ortiz and Carolina Casal de Valdez, a Spanish married couple who emigrated to New York City from Puerto Rico. Upon Prudencio's death in 1976, the company was valued at $8.5 million, and was passed on to sons Joseph, Charles, Francisco, and Anthony. Under Joseph's tenure as chief executive Goya became a major corporation, which by 1998 produced about 800 food items, employed 2,000 workers, and had about US$700 million in annual revenue. In 2004, Joseph was ousted by fellow family members, who replaced him with Robert Unanue, son of Anthony. By that time, the company was generating more than $1 billion in annual revenue.

== History ==
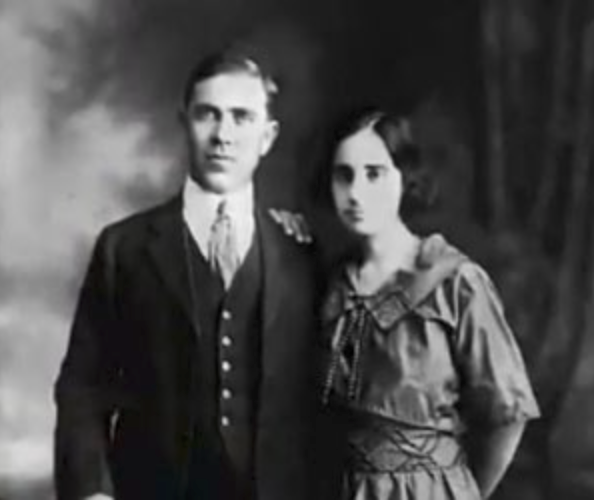
Don Prudencio Unanue and wife

Goya Foods was established in the United States in 1936, in New York City, by Prudencio Unanue Ortiz (1886–1976) from Valle de Mena, Spain. Previously, he had immigrated to Puerto Rico, where he met and married Carolina Casal (1890–1984), also a Spanish immigrant. There the family had opened a small store called "Unanue and Sons" in 1922; however, it was converted to wholesale in the mid 1930s. Prudencio purchased the "Goya" name from a Moroccan sardine company because he believed that his last name was too difficult to pronounce for American customers and also liked the association to Spanish artist Francisco Goya.

When Prudencio Unanue died in 1976, he left Goya to his sons, Joseph, Charles, Francisco, and Anthony. Joseph A. Unanue became president and chief executive of Goya, then just an $8.5 million company, sharing control with Francisco, who served as president of Goya de Puerto Rico Inc., responsible for much of the company's manufacturing operations. Joseph A. Unanue's son, Joseph F. Unanue, was general manager and vice president of Goya de Puerto Rico from 1989 to 1996, when he became executive vice president at the company's New Jersey headquarters, assuming the No. 2 position in the company; he died two years later.

During Joseph A. Unanue's decades at the head of the company Goya grew to become a major corporation. By 1998, the company had 2,000 employees, and about $700 million in revenue from about 800 food items (including rice, beans, sauces, and spices). He was ousted from his then position as Goya chairman and CEO in 2004, amid a feud in the Unanue family about the direction of the company. At the time Goya was generating from $750 million to more than $1 billion in revenue. Joseph's son Andy Unanue, the chief operating officer of the company, was forced out of Goya amid the disagreement, prompting litigation. Robert Unanue (Anthony's son) and his cousin Frank Unanue made the decision to remove Andy, who had previously been considered the "heir apparent" to Goya. Joseph Unanue retained a significant stake in the company, and retained a seat on its board; he died in 2013. Robert Unanue was the chief executive between 2004 and 2025. The fracturing of Goya's ownership among its founders' descendants has frequently led to disputes about the company's strategy.

In 2012, the company began construction on a $127 million distribution center in the industrial Meadowlands area of Jersey City, backed by New Jersey state tax incentives that aided the company in its move from Secaucus.

In 2019, Goya had talks with The Carlyle Group about a possible buyout, which did not proceed.

In February 2025, CEO Robert Unanue published a press release suggesting that he was out of the company following a vote by the company board. CNN reported that Robert had been sued by Goya and company executive Frank Unanue earlier in the month, with the lawsuit alleging that Robert colluded with Goya's former IT department head who had caused millions of dollars in damages to the company. In August 2025, Robert sued Goya, alleging defamation and wrongly denied compensation.

== Description ==
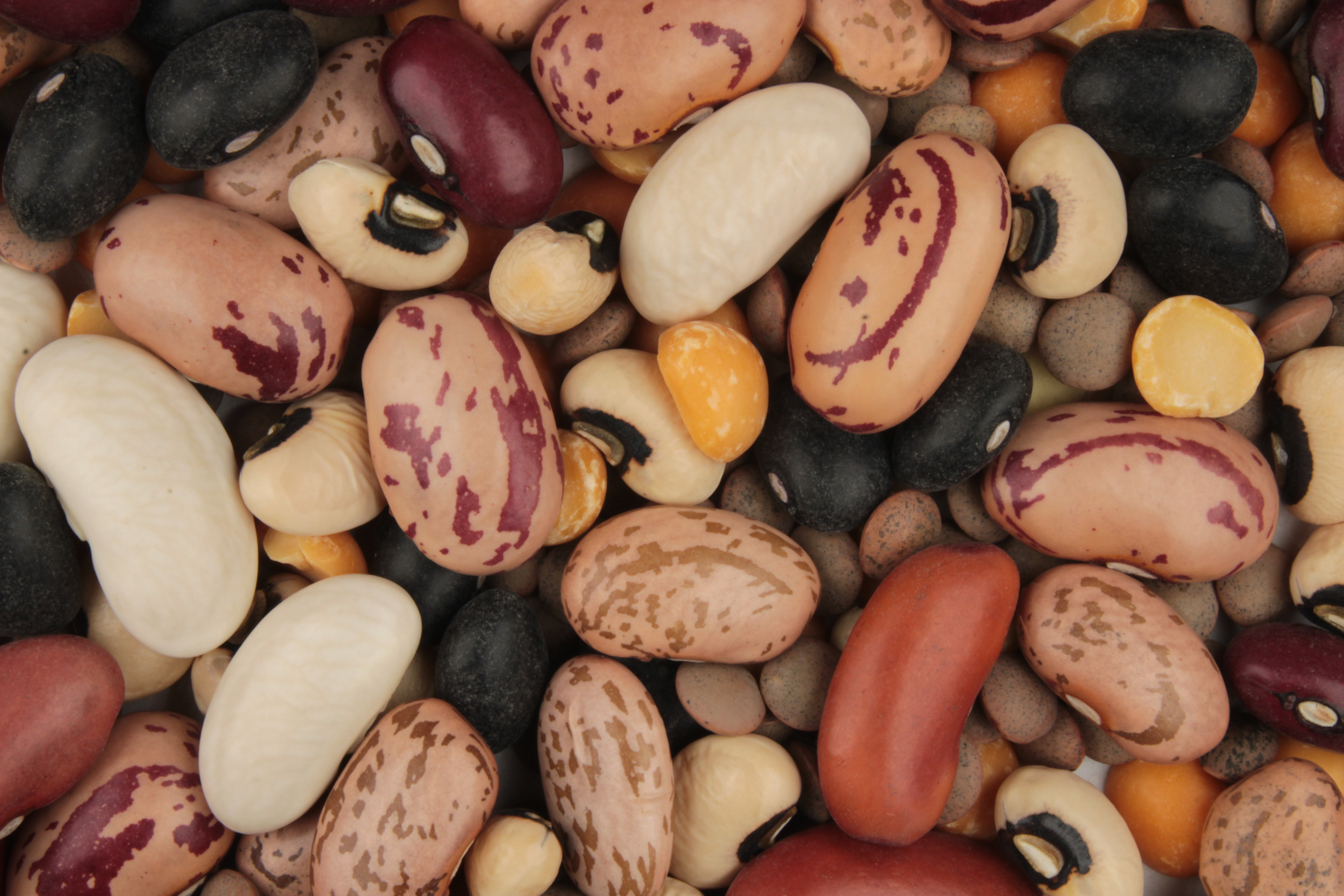
Goya brand beans, peas, and lentils

Goya manufactures and distributes products from the Spanish, Puerto Rican, Caribbean, Mexican, Cuban and Central and South American cuisine. Their products are sold in stores and supermarket chains throughout the United States (including Puerto Rico) and international markets. In 2006, Forbes ranked Goya 355th on its list of the largest private companies in the United States.

Between 2014 and 2016 Goya opened five new facilities including manufacturing and distribution centers located in New Jersey, Texas, California, and Georgia to meet rising consumer demand. Currently, Goya Foods is headquartered on a 40-acre (16 ha) lot in Jersey City, New Jersey. Goya also operates a manufacturing facility in San Cristóbal, Dominican Republic, and a distribution center in Bayamón, Puerto Rico.

== Corporate affairs ==
=== Goya Gives ===
"Goya Gives" is a program to support various charities, scholarships, and events, and includes donations of products to food shelters and food banks during times of crisis, such as Hurricane Maria in Puerto Rico. In March and April 2020, in response to the COVID-19 pandemic, Goya donated over 300,000 pounds (140,000 kg) of food, or about 270,000 meals, to food banks and other organizations in the United States, and also donated more than 20,000 protective masks.

=== MyPlate/MiPlato campaign ===
In 2012, the company joined First Lady Michelle Obama's "My Plate" healthy eating initiative.

=== Political views ===
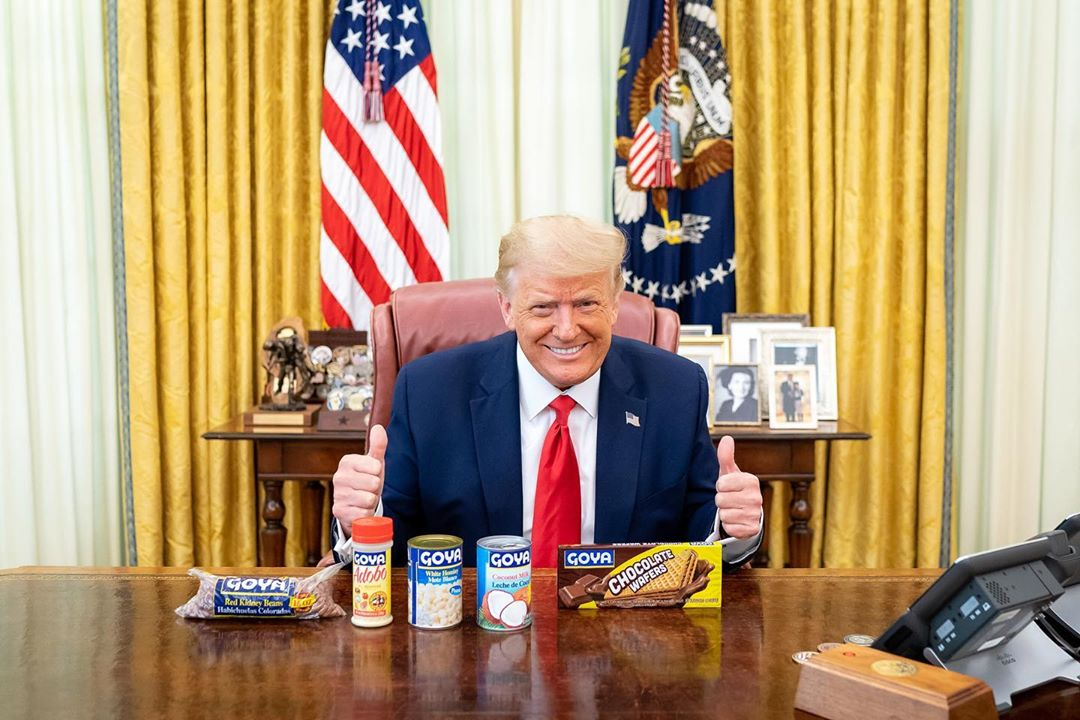
President Donald J. Trump advertising Goya products on the Resolute desk in the White House on July 15, 2020

On July 9, 2020, at a White House roundtable discussion of the Hispanic Prosperity Initiative with President Donald Trump, Goya Foods co-owner and CEO Robert Unanue praised Trump, saying the country was "truly blessed [...] to have a leader like President Trump, who is a builder" and adding, "we have an incredible builder and we pray, we pray for our leadership, our president and for our country, that we continue to prosper and to grow."

Unanue's comments prompted a call for a public boycott on social media, which was supported by various Latino public figures, including Alexandria Ocasio-Cortez, Julian Castro, and Lin-Manuel Miranda. In response, Unanue stated the next day that this was a "suppression of speech" and declined to apologize for his comments. Supporters called for an anti-boycott "buycott" in support of the company. Goya used its corporate Twitter account to call attention to its pledge made at the White House event to donate cans of food for those affected by COVID-19, and a Goya supporter launched a GoFundMe campaign that raised money to buy Goya products and donate them to food pantries.

On December 7, 2020, Unanue stated that Ocasio-Cortez was named "employee of the month" after her boycott call led to a 1000% sales spike. On January 26, 2021, Goya's board of directors voted to censure Unanue following statements disputing the 2020 United States presidential election, banning him from speaking to the media. An anonymous CNN source familiar with the board’s actions claimed that Unanue's statements "imperiled the future of the company and endangered the lives of some of the shareholders," and that the controversy following Unanue's White House appearance had not been good for the company. The majority of the company's board favored removing Unanue from his position, but the family-owned business regulations did not allow for that.

During CPAC 2021, Goya Foods CEO Unanue claimed the 2020 election was illegitimate, and that Donald Trump was "the real, the legitimate, and the still actual president".

In April, 2023, Jura Liaukonyte, an economics professor at Cornell University said that boycott efforts of Goya foods had not only failed, but had actually led to an increase in Goya sales. Liaukonyte made the statement during an interview regarding the 2023 boycott of Bud Light beer. Boycotts are typically short lived, Liaukonyte said, and in the case of Goya had backfired, as sales had increased from first-time buyers.

== In popular culture ==
Goya Foods logo and imagery has been featured in artwork, including paintings, prints and sculptures, most notably by Cuban-American artist Ric Garcia, sculptor Alexander Mijares, painter John Kilduff, and others.

== See also ==
- La Costeña (food company)
