= Murray Handwerker =

American businessman

Murray Handwerker (July 25, 1921 – May 14, 2011) was an American businessman who expanded Nathan's Famous, a fast food restaurant specializing in hot dogs, from a family-owned hot dog stand to a nationally franchised chain. The original Nathan's Famous hot dog stand was opened in Coney Island, Brooklyn, by Handwerker's father, Nathan Handwerker, in 1916.

== Early life ==
Murray Handwerker was born on July 25, 1921, to Polish-Jewish immigrant parents, Nathan and Ida Handwerker, in New York City. He often visited and worked at his father's hot dog stand as a child. Handwerker served in the United States Army during World War II. In 1947, he received a bachelor's degree in French from New York University.

Handwerker initially took over and renovated the Roadside Rest, a roadside restaurant in Oceanside, New York, during the 1950s. However, he soon returned to his family's hot dog business.

== Expansion of Nathan's Famous ==
Handwerker expanded Nathan's Famous in the decades following World War II. In 1968, Murray Handwerker became the president of the Nathan's Famous chain. The company reached ten franchises, with 43 restaurants directly owned by the company, by 1977. Additionally, Handwerker wrote a cookbook, Nathan's Famous Hot Dog Cookbook, which was published in 1968. He sold the company to a group of investors in 1987.

== Death ==
Murray Handwerker died of complications from dementia on May 14, 2011, at his home in Palm Beach Gardens, Florida, at age 89. He was survived by his sons, Steven, Kenneth and William. His wife, Dorothy, died in 2009.
