= Unanue family =

Family

Unanue
- Business
- Current region: Manhattan, New York City, United States East Coast
- Origin: Valle de Mena, Burgos, Spain
- Founded: 1918, New York; 108 years ago
- Founder: Prudencio Unanue Ortiz (1886–1976)
- Members: 12 incl: Joseph A. Unanue; Andy Unanue; Robert Unanue (CEO)
- Connected members: Migbelis Castellanos

The Unanue family of New York City is a wealthy American family of Spanish heritage descent. They were the 170th richest family in the United States in 2014 according to Forbes, having a net worth of US$1.1 billion.

The patriarch, Prudencio Unanue Ortiz, migrated from Spain to Puerto Rico 1903, and later to New York City, where he established Goya Foods in 1936, the largest Hispanic-owned food company in the United States. The family's members include Joseph A. Unanue and Andy Unanue. Goya Foods is the 377th largest private American company.

== First generation ==
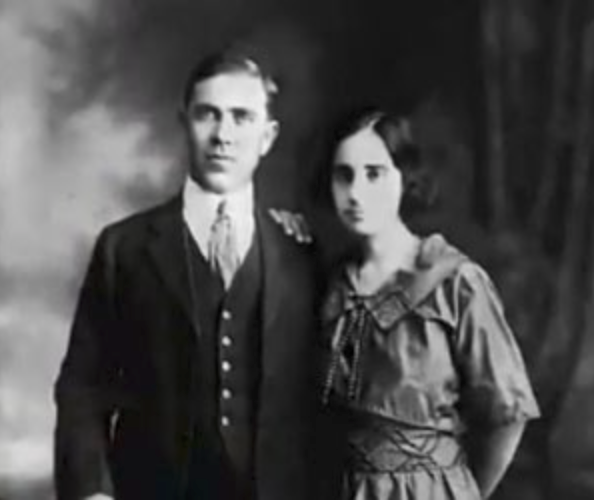
Don Prudencio Unanue and wife Carolina Casal

Prudencio Unanue Ortiz (1886–1976), was the founder of Goya Foods. He was born in Villasana de Mena, in the province of Burgos, in northern Spain. In 1903, at the age of seventeen, Unanue migrated to San Lorenzo, Puerto Rico, in search of employment opportunities and established a small food distribution business. In 1918 he moved on to New York City, to enroll in the Albany Business School, and in 1921 returned to San Lorenzo to marry Carolina Casal de Valdés (1890–1984), from Pontevedra, Galicia, whom he had met there and whose parents had also emigrated from Spain.

The year after their marriage, the Unanues moved to New Jersey, where Don Prudencio, as he was always known in his firm, became a broker for Spanish foods. The company was originally known as Unanue & Sons and in 1961 it changed to Goya Foods. The couple had four sons, Joseph A., Charles, Francisco and Anthony.

== Second generation ==
- Charles Unanue (born Ulpiano Unanue) (1922–2015). Charles was born in Puerto Rico. In 1969, he was Chief Operating Officer and Chief Executive Officer of all of the companies, including Goya. However, he was later dismissed.

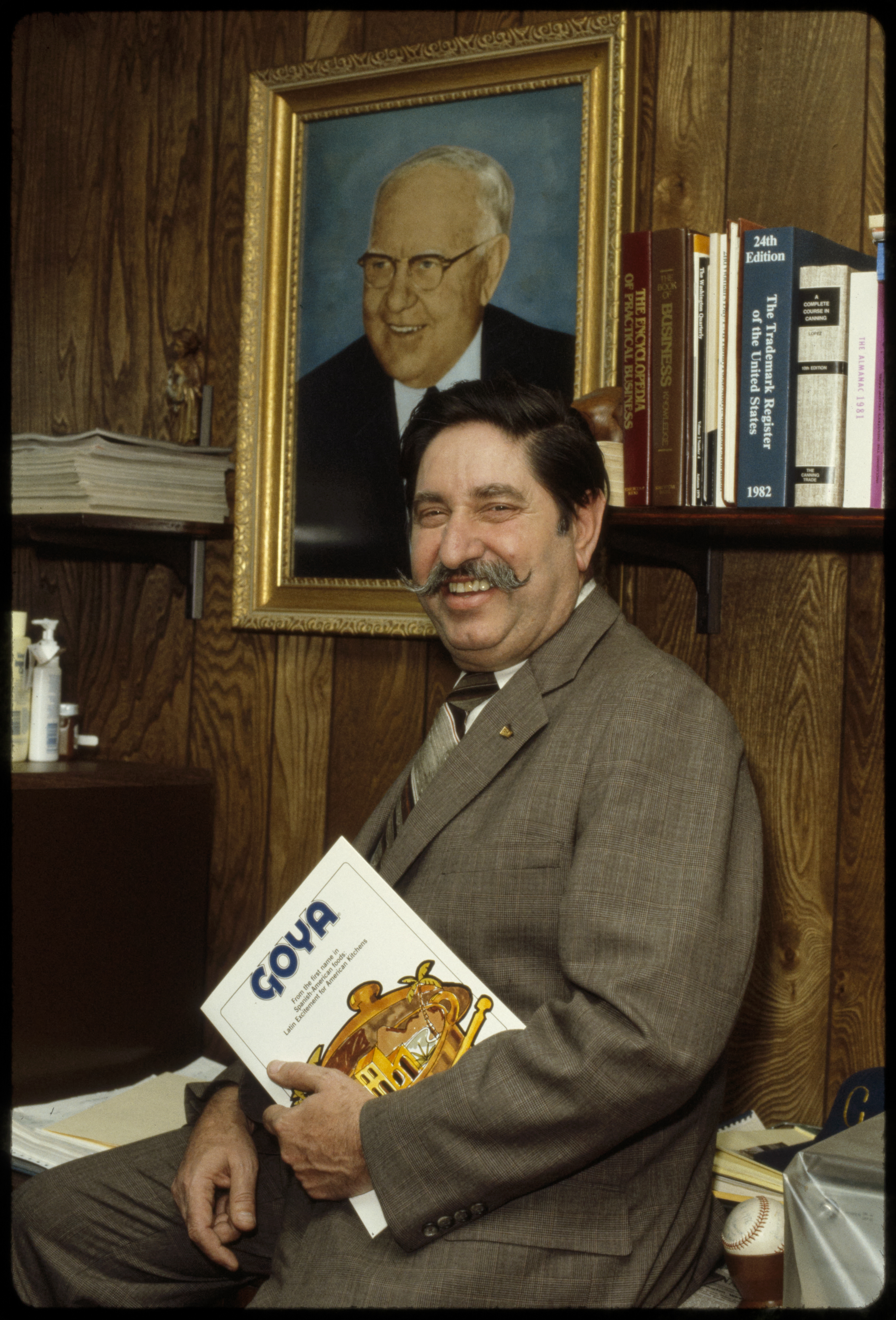
Joseph A. Unanue, Goya president 1976–2004

- Joseph A. Unanue (1925–2013). New York-born Joseph Andrew Unanue served as president and CEO of Goya Foods from 1976 until 2004. He had served in the United States Army during World War II, and was awarded the Bronze star for bravery. He married Carmen Ana Casal (b. Puerto Rico) and had six children: Andy, Mimi, Maribel, Joey, Mary Ann and Mari. He died in June 2013 in Alpine, New Jersey.
- Anthony Unanue (1927–1976). Engineer, while in Maryland worked briefly for the federal government. Died in 1976 aged 48. Had six children, the eldest Robert, Tom, Peter and three others.
- Francisco Unanue a/k/a Frank Unanue (1931–2002). He founded Goya de Puerto Rico in the 1960s becoming president of that division. He was also a founder of the Spanish Chamber of commerce in New York. Francisco "Frank" Unanue Casal was born on June 17, 1931, in Ridgefield Park, New Jersey, and died in Puerto Rico on December 13, 2002, with the funeral held at the Iglesia Santa Teresita in Santurce. He was buried at the Cementerio Porta Coeli in Bayamón. He married Diana Margarita Lopez and had four children, Frankie, Carlos, Anne-Marie, and Jorge.

== Third generation ==
- Andy Unanue, current managing partner of AUA Private Equity Partners and former chief operating officer of Goya Foods since 1999.
- Joseph F. Unanue (1957–1998) vice president of operations for Goya Foods since 1995. He previously was general manager of Goya de Puerto Rico. He was born in Santurce, Puerto Rico, and had married Isabel Banuchi having three daughters, Isabel, Sofia and Juliana.
- Carlos Unanue, as of 2013 is president of Goya de Puerto Rico.
- Frank Unanue, as of 2013 is president of Goya operations in Florida.
- Jorge Unanue
- Robert "Bob" Unanue (1954–), CEO of Goya Foods since 2004. On February 23, 2025, he announced that Goya's board had terminated his employment with the company. Robert Unanue was born in Wyckoff, New Jersey, the eldest of six children to Anthony Unanue. In 1973 the family moved to Spain for a few years where he assisted his father with an olive oil production business. During this period, he enrolled at the University of Seville. He is married to Muriel Fitzpatrick. Unanue ran operations in Puerto Rico for seven years during the 1980s.
- Tom Unanue as of 2008 ran the Florida operations for Goya.
- Peter Unanue, Executive Vice President of Goya Foods. As president of Goya Foods he sponsored a statue of Roberto Clemente in New York City (Statue of Roberto Clemente (New York City)).

== Politics ==
The family supported Michelle Obama in 2012 with MyPlate, an initiative to encourage Hispanics and African Americans to eat balanced meals.

In July 2020, Goya Foods CEO Robert Unanue visited the White House and pledged one million cans of Goya chickpeas to food banks, saying "Americans are truly blessed to have a leader like Donald Trump." The comments sparked some negative reactions and calls for a boycott of Goya Foods, which in turn sparked counter-boycotts in support of Goya.

On 7 December 2020, CEO Robert Unanue stated that Alexandria Ocasio-Cortez was named "employee of the month" after her boycott call led to a tenfold sales spike.

On January 25, 2021, Bob Unanue was censured by Goya's board of directors after he made unfounded public claims about voter fraud during and after the 2020 presidential election. He is not allowed to speak to the press in regard to the politics of the company without permission from the board.

In February 2021, in a speech given at CPAC, Robert Unanue continued to deny the results of the 2020 election, falsely stating that Trump was "the real, the legitimate, and still the actual president of the United States". Unanue also stated "We still have faith that the majority of the people in the United States voted for the president," despite Biden defeating Trump by more than 7 million votes.

Robert Unanue also spoke on the first night of the 2024 Republican National Convention and during a Donald Trump rally hosted by Turning Point USA in Glendale, Arizona. On February 23, 2025, Unanue announced that Goya's board had voted to terminate his employment with the company.

== See also ==
- List of Spanish Americans
