= Nathan Handwerker =

Polish-American restaurateur (1892–1974)

- Born: June 14, 1892; Galicia, Austria-Hungary (now part of Poland)
- Died: March 24, 1974 (aged 81); Port Charlotte or Sarasota, Florida, United States
- Occupation: Restaurateur
- Known for: Nathan's Famous

Nathan Handwerker (June 14, 1892 – March 24, 1974) was the founder of an iconic hot dog stand that evolved into Nathan's Famous restaurants and related Nathan's retail product line. An immigrant from Poland, he and his wife Ida used $300 to start their business on Coney Island in 1916. As of 2016, Nathan's operates over 400 company owned and franchised restaurants in all 50 states and 17 foreign countries, and Nathan's brand products are found in some 45,000 stores across the United States.

== Biography ==
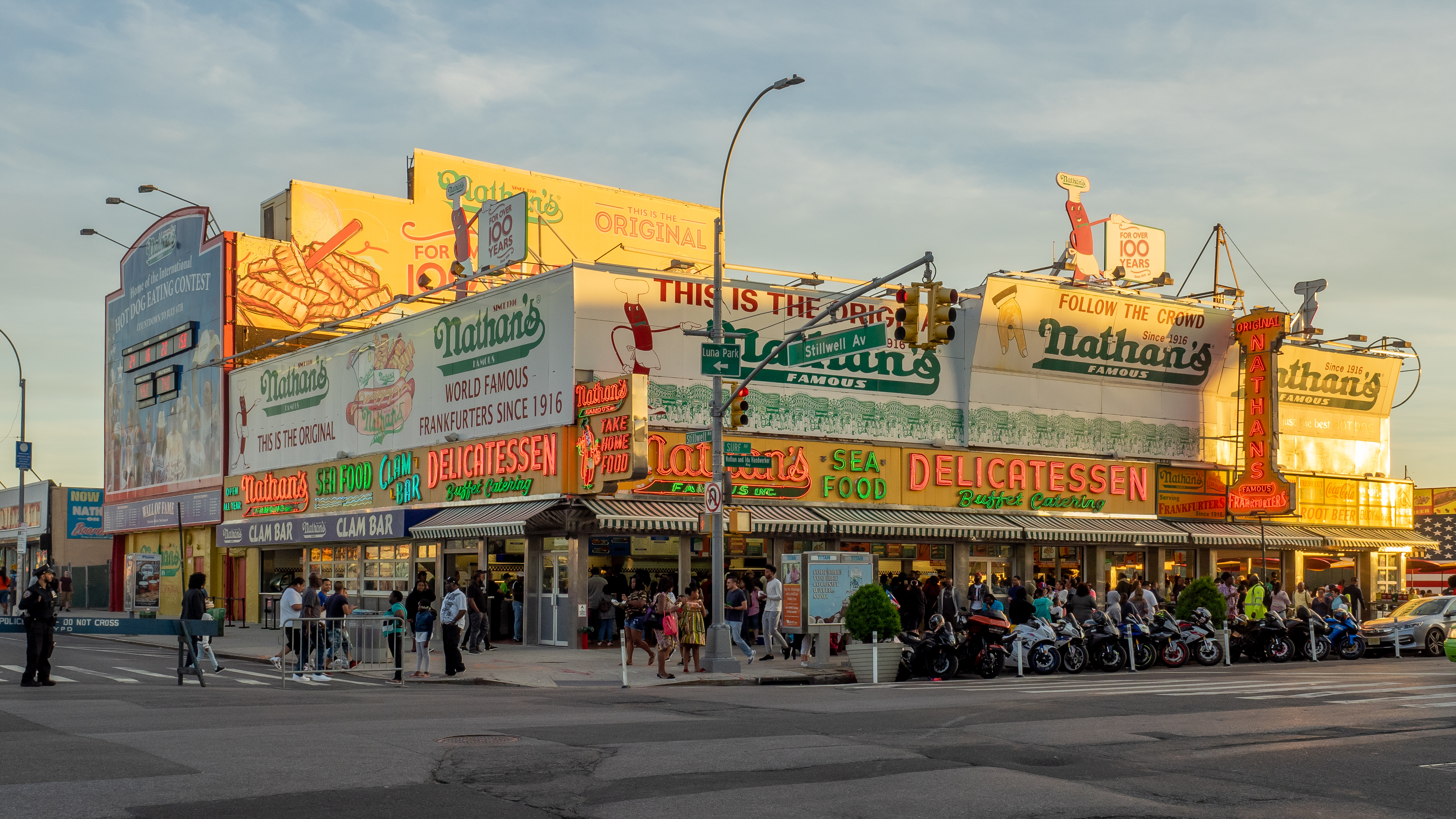
Nathan's Famous in 2019

Handwerker was born in Galicia, a former kingdom and constituent part of the Austro-Hungarian Empire in the partitioned Poland under the Austrian rule that roughly spanned the contemporary Poland-Ukraine border. One of 13 children of a poor Jewish shoemaker, he immigrated to the United States in 1912. Handwerker found work as a delivery boy and later obtained a job slicing bread rolls at Feltman's German Gardens, a restaurant in Coney Island, Brooklyn. The restaurant sold franks (hot dogs) for 10 cents each.

By one account, Handwerker was encouraged by singing waiters Eddie Cantor and Jimmy Durante to go into business in competition with Feltman's; as United Press International noted in 1974, "There are many stories about Nathan and how the business began, but this is the way he told it..." The company's official history does not mention the encouragement of those two entertainers. Nathan and Ida spent their life savings of $300 to begin the business. One story claims that to help build his savings faster, Handwerker's only meals were the hot dogs that he could eat at work for free. In 1916 Handwerker and his new wife, Ida Handwerker, opened a small hot dog stand with a two-foot grill on the corner of Surf and Stillwell Avenues in Coney Island. They spiced their hot dogs with Ida's secret recipe and sold them for a nickel.

Handwerker named his previously unnamed hot dog stand Nathan's Hot Dogs in 1921 after Sophie Tucker, then a singer at the nearby Carey Walsh's Cafe, made a hit of the song "Nathan, Nathan, Why You Waitin?"

The food stand developed into the fast food chain Nathan's Famous, spearheaded by his son, Murray Handwerker.

On March 23, 1974, Nathan Handwerker suffered a heart attack at his home in North Port Charlotte, Florida. He died March 24, 1974, per differing accounts at either St. Joseph's Hospital in Port Charlotte, Florida, or at Sarasota General Hospital, in Sarasota, Florida. He was buried at Mt. Lebanon Cemetery in Glendale, Queens, New York.

In 2014, Famous Nathan was released, a feature-length documentary film, created by a grandson of Nathan's, Lloyd Handwerker, telling the family history of Nathan's Famous.

In 2016, the corner of Surf Avenue and Stillwell Avenue was co-named Nathan & Ida Handwerker Way to honor Nathan and his wife Ida.
