= Brand alliances =

Marketing strategy

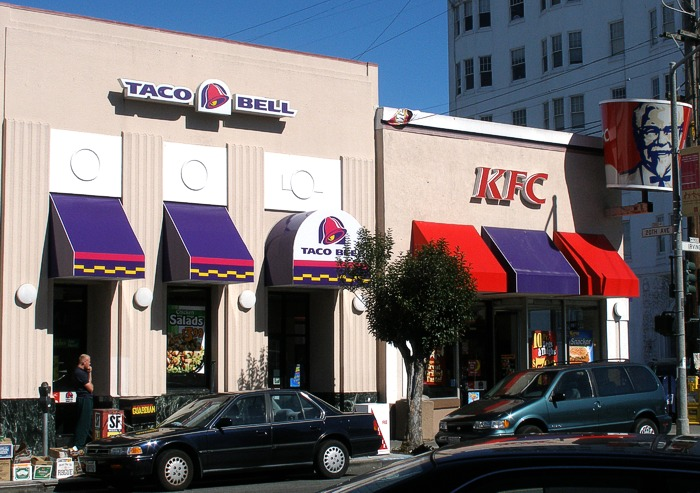
A typical co-branded restaurant that offers products from two or more of the company's brands (in this case, Taco Bell and KFC)

Brand alliances is a branding strategy used in a business alliance. Brand alliances are divided into three types.

== Cobrands ==
Cobrands are the usage of two or more brands on one certain product. For example, Dell computers carry three brands on their packages and cases: Dell, Microsoft Windows, and Intel. A visible example of cobranding is combining two or more of their restaurants under one roof. In many places, it is not unusual to see a Taco Bell and KFC or a Pizza Hut and WingStreet combined.

== Brand licenses ==
Brand licenses are a contractual agreement where a company lets another organization use its brand on other products in exchange for a licensing fee. An example of brand licensing is seen in the Walt Disney Company's relationship to Tokyo Disneyland. The theme park is owned by The Oriental Land Company, which licenses the theme from The Walt Disney Company.

== Cross marketing ==
Cross marketing is an agreement for mutual promotion between two companies. One company for instance will include coupons for another company in its parcels to its clients if the other company will agree to include a promotion from the other company in its direct mails to its client base.

== General references ==
- Ferrell, O.C. & Hartline, Michael (2005). Marketing Strategy. Thomson South-Western. ISBN 0-324-20140-0.
