= History of Ybor City =

Neighborhood history

Ybor City
- Neighborhood
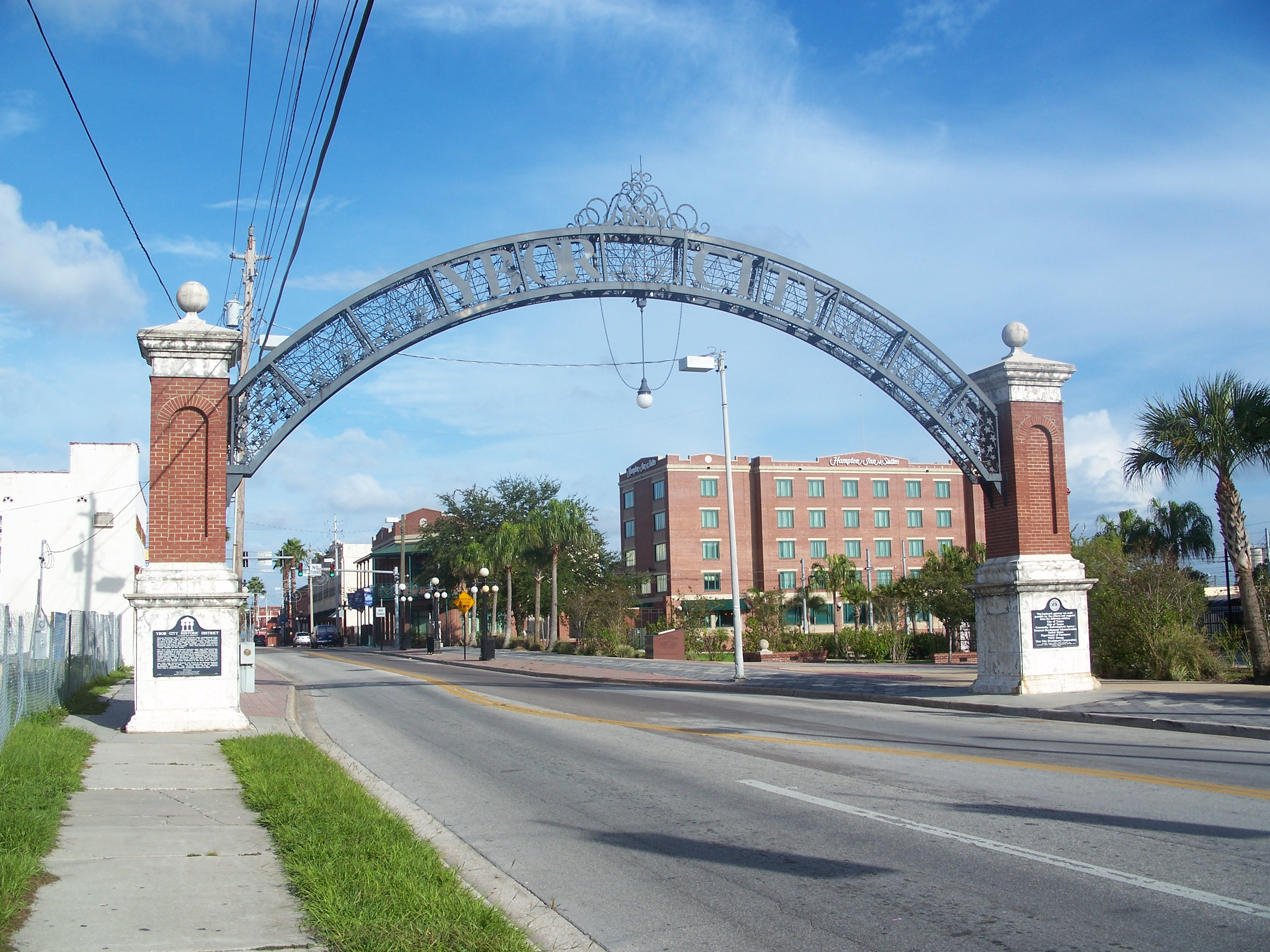
- Gateway to Ybor City on 7th. Ave near the Nick Nuccio Parkway
- Nickname: Florida's Latin Quarter
- Interactive map of Ybor City
- Coordinates: 27°57′23.04″N 82°26′3.84″W
- Country: United States
- State: Florida
- County: Hillsborough
- City: Tampa
- Founded: 1885
- Annexed by Tampa: 1887
- Time zone: UTC-5 (EST)
  - Summer (DST): UTC-4 (EDT)
- Website: www.yboronline.com

Ybor City (/ˈiːbɔːr/ EE-bor) is a historic neighborhood that includes the Ybor City Historic District in Tampa, Florida. It is located just northeast of downtown Tampa and north of Port Tampa Bay. The neighborhood has distinct architectural, culinary, cultural, and historical legacy that reflects its multi-ethnic composition. It was unique in the American South as a prosperous manufacturing community built and populated almost entirely by immigrants.

Ybor City was founded as an independent town in 1885 by a group of cigar manufacturers led by Vicente Martinez-Ybor and was annexed by Tampa in 1887. The original population was mostly composed of Cuban and Spanish immigrants who worked in the cigar factories. Italian and Eastern-European Jewish immigrants followed shortly thereafter and established many retail shops, farms and grocery stores, box factories, print shops, and other enterprises which catered to the cigar industry and its workers.

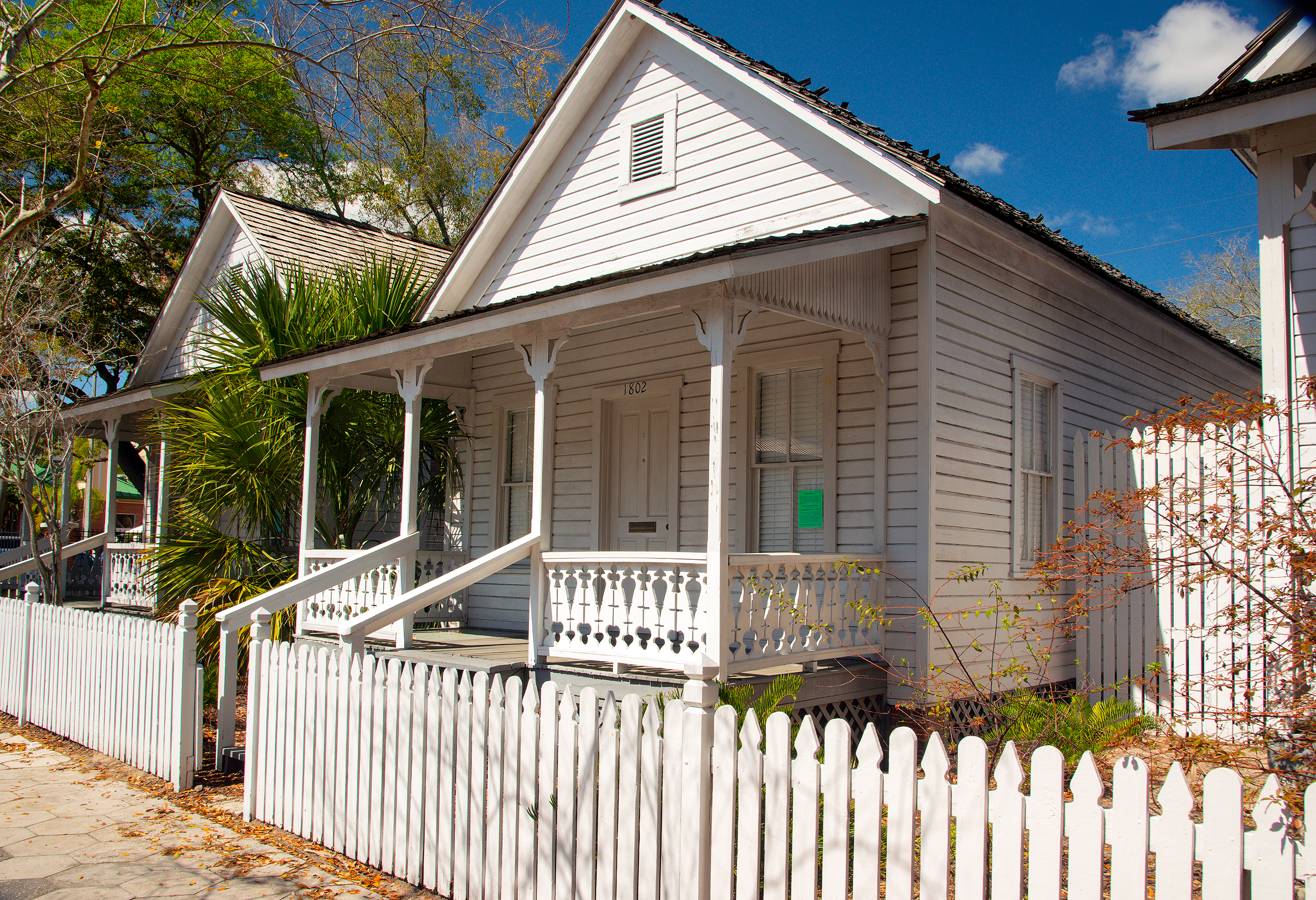
Restored casitas at the Ybor City Museum State Park

Martinez-Ybor started the practice of building small houses, "casitas", that his workers could buy at cost, in order to increase staff retention. He also helped to ensure medical care and paved the local streets and sidewalks.

The neighborhood grew rapidly during the 1890s, quickly evolving from a primitive outpost with streets of loose sand populated mainly by young Cuban and Spanish men seeking work into a bustling city with modern amenities and a diverse demographic makeup. During this decade, Ybor City's residents founded mutual aid societies, labor organizations, newspapers in several languages, and many other social and civic organizations along with a diverse roster of businesses, helping to create a vibrant civil society that blended the residents' different cultures of origin into a new "Latin" culture unique to Tampa. Ybor City continued to grow and prosper through the 1920s, by which time its factories were producing almost half a billion hand-rolled cigars every year, giving Tampa the nickname of the "Cigar City".

The coming of the Great Depression in the early 1930s brought a sharp reduction in the worldwide demand for fine cigars, and Ybor City's economic base suffered greatly. Some cigar factories closed, others ended the hand-rolled tradition and turned to mechanization to reduce costs, and remaining operations sharply decreased production and payrolls, resulting in widespread unemployment and hardship across the entire neighborhood. Demand for cigars increased after World War II, but by that time, almost all of Ybor City's cigar factories were mechanized and did not re-hire the skilled and well-paid artisans they had once employed by the thousands. As veterans returned from the war, they largely chose to leave the aging neighborhood for areas with better housing and economic prospects, accelerating the trend of declining population and economic contraction. This process accelerated further through the 1950s and 60s, when the federal Urban Renewal program and the construction of Interstate 4 resulted in the demolition of many structures, including hundreds of housing units. Planned redevelopment never took place, and, with its commercial district and social core virtually abandoned, Ybor City lapsed into a period of neglect and decay.

Beginning in the 1980s, the old business district centered on 7th Avenue (La Septima) began a slow recovery, first as a bohemian haven for artists and, by the early 1990s, as a popular nightlife and entertainment district. Since 2000, many historic structures near 7th Avenue have been renovated and restored, and construction has filled in most long-vacant lots. Among the new structures are hotels, office and retail space, and apartment complexes, leading to the Ybor City's first population increases in over half a century. Residential areas such as V.M. Ybor and Tampa Heights have also begun to see gentrification, with older structures being restored and new ones built.

While Ybor City's old business district and some nearby residential areas have been revitalized, not all of the original neighborhood has shared in the recovery. Poverty and blight are ongoing problems in portions of Greater Ybor City, especially north of I-4 and east of 22nd Street.

== Establishment ==
=== Guavas and cigars ===
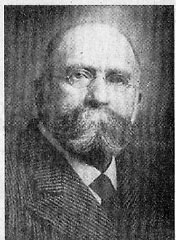
Gavino Gutierrez

Ybor City came into existence as a direct result of a New York City businessman's failed search for guava trees. Spanish émigré Gavino Gutierrez was a civil engineer by training, but was employed by a New York City fruit packing and canning firm in the mid-1880s. He had heard that there were many guava trees growing wild in the Tampa Bay area and, looking to add to his company's product line, set out to find them in November 1884.

The trip was long and difficult. The existing railroad line to Florida run by the Plant System only went as far south as Jacksonville, Florida, with a steamboat connection down the St. Johns River to Sanford, Florida (near present-day Orlando). Gutierrez took the rest of the trip across the state by stagecoach over unpaved country roads (an isolated rail line, the South Florida Railroad, connected Sanford and Tampa at this time and was completed less than a year prior to Gutierrez's visit). Gutierrez did not find any commercial quality guavas in the isolated village of Tampa. The community's main commercial activities were fishing and the shipping of Florida cattle and citrus from its small port. The local economy was struggling; however, Henry Plant, owner of the Plant System and majority shareholder of the South Florida Railroad, was in the process of extending his network of railroad lines across the state, which would eventually connect Tampa directly with the rest of the U.S. rail system. Gutierrez left Tampa convinced that the area had the potential for development once the railroad was complete. Tampa would acquire its first direct rail connection to the rest of the country via a line built by the Jacksonville, Tampa and Key West Railway, which opened on February 20, 1886, and connected the Plant System at Jacksonville with the South Florida Railroad at Sanford. This line would later be purchased by the Plant System in 1899.

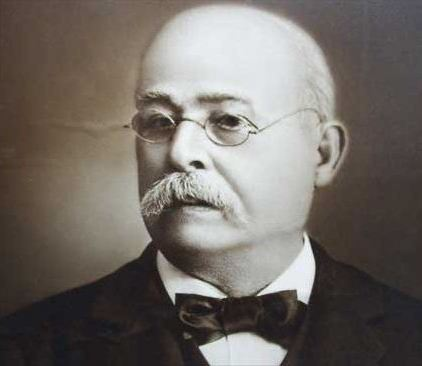
Vicente Martinez Ybor

Gutierrez returned to New York by sea, stopping on the way to visit his friend Vicente Martinez Ybor at his home in Key West. Ybor was a fellow Spaniard who had built a prosperous cigar-making operation in Havana, Cuba based on his El Príncipe de Gales (Prince of Wales) brand. However, Ybor had provided public support and private financial assistance to Cuban revolutionaries fighting against Spanish colonial rule, and had escaped from Cuba with his family in 1868 to avoid being arrested or killed by the Spanish authorities.

Ybor rebuilt a successful business in Key West. However, by the early 1880s, high costs, labor strife, and transportation issues (overseas land links were still decades away) had him exploring relocation options once again. Several southern American port cities such as Mobile, Alabama; Pensacola, Florida; and Galveston, Texas had offered land and other concessions to attract Ybor's factories to their town, but none of the proposals were satisfactory.

Upon learning about Ybor's plans, Gutierrez mentioned Tampa as another possible site for relocation. Ybor was intrigued, as was Ignacio Haya, a visiting Spanish cigar manufacturer from New York who was also looking for a new factory location.

Haya and Ybor boarded the next available steamship sailing for Tampa and arrived the next day. They agreed that Tampa was an excellent location for cigar production: it was near enough to Cuba that importing Cuban tobacco by sea would be quick and cheap; the climate was warm and humid, which would keep the tobacco leaves fresh and workable; and Plant's new railroad line would make it easy to ship the finished cigars across the United States. However, Ybor continued negotiating with other cities while opening talks with Tampa's Board of Trade to secure land and other enticements.

=== Making a deal ===
Months later, in September 1885, Ybor and Haya set out on a "fact-finding mission" to the most promising relocation sites, hoping to finalize a deal and begin moving their operations soon thereafter. Their first visit was to Tampa, where the sticking point was the price of a 40-acre (16 ha) tract of land that Ybor was interested in buying from John T. Lesley for $9000, but Ybor was only willing to pay $5000. Ybor had hoped that face to face negotiations would facilitate an agreement, but neither side was willing to budge.

Seemingly at an impasse, Ybor and Haya prepared to move on to their next potential site: Galveston, Texas. But on October 5, 1885, as the men were literally about to depart, the Tampa Board of Trade, including W. C. Brown and W. B. Henderson, offered to subsidize the $4000 difference in the price of the land Ybor wished to buy. Ybor readily agreed, and quickly moved to purchase 50 more adjoining acres. Haya bought his own smaller tract.

Preparation to move their cigar operations began immediately. On October 8, only three days after making the real estate deals, Ybor had crews at work clearing the land and had invited Gavino Gutierrez to lay out a street grid for a new town, which was to be dubbed Ybor City.

There was almost a major crisis before the settlement got started. The only bank in Tampa at the time was a branch of the Jacksonville-based First National Bank. Due to the stagnant state of commercial business in town, bank management had decided to close the location. When Ignacio Haya heard the news, he visited the bank's office to find the fixtures and equipment being packed up for shipment back to Jacksonville. Haya explained to branch manager T.C. Taliaferro that he and Ybor would need the services of a local bank to run their operations, and promised that the initial payroll would come to at least $10,000. On his own volition, Taliaferro began unpacking the boxes. The branch remained open and the crisis was averted.

=== Company town ===
Cigar making was not just a job to the tabaqueros (literally, "tobacco workers"). The torcedores who rolled the finished cigars, especially, thought of themselves as "more of an artist than a worker." The trade was closely regulated by the tabaqueros in a manner reminiscent of the artisan's guilds of old Europe. Beginners trained through lengthy apprenticeships in the hopes of someday becoming a well-respected (and well-paid) master torcedor.

Key West was home to thousands of trained tabaqueros in 1885. In contrast, Tampa was a small town with a population of about 3,000 and no resident cigar workers. Ybor would have to convince potential employees to leave established communities in Key West (and Cuba and New York) to help build a frontier settlement. While he enjoyed the goodwill of many Cuban tabaqueros because of his well-known support for Cuba Libre, that would not be enough.

Ybor's idea was to build a modified company town. Unlike other such communities in which the company owned virtually all of the housing and businesses (such as Pullman, Illinois), Ybor envisioned a place in which employees could own their homes and private entrepreneurs could buy land on which to build businesses. This, he hoped, would create a pleasant environment to better attract more residents to Ybor City.

Ybor also had good business reasons to be magnanimous. His goal was to not only attract residents to town, but to get them to stay. His employees in Key West had often traveled back and forth between Florida and Cuba looking for the best pay and conditions. By offering the anchor of land and home ownership – something most tabaqueros had never experienced, especially in land-scarce Key West – Ybor encouraged his workers to stick around. Though the workforce was still relatively fluid in the early years, enough workers remained in Tampa to keep the cigar factories fully staffed and running year-round.

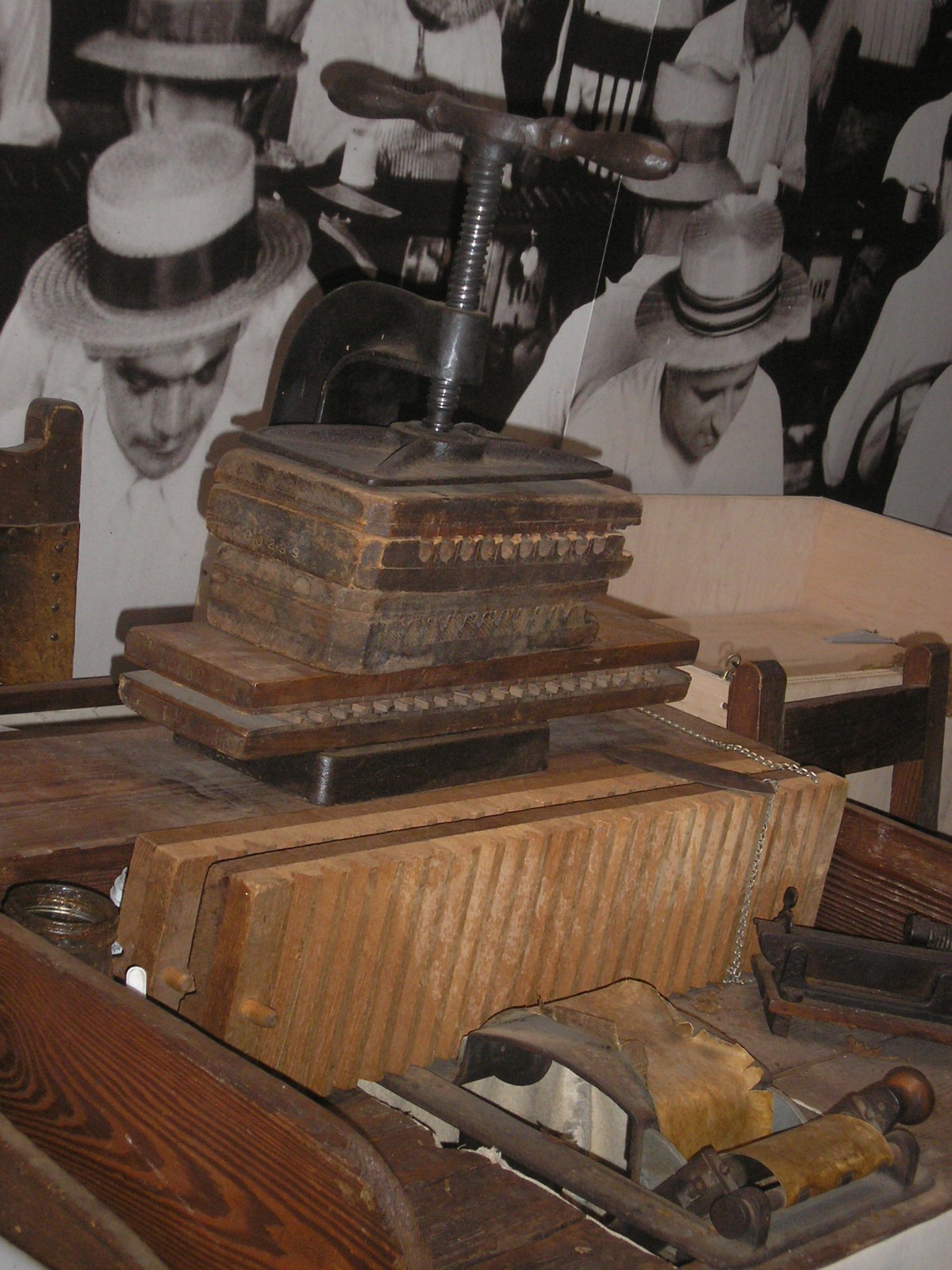
Cigar maker's tools, Ybor City Museum State Park

Along with the hastily built wooden factories constructed by Ybor and Haya, some of the first structures in Ybor City were 50 small houses (casitas) for prospective employees. These narrow shotgun-style homes (so called because a shot fired through the front door would theoretically exit harmlessly out of the aligned back door) were small wooden structures, but they were well-built and relatively comfortable. Ybor offered them for sale at a price just above his cost to build them (initially $400), payable in small deductions from the workers' salary in his cigar factory.

Another of Ybor's modifications to the company town model was that his community was not a one-(or even two-) company town. To increase the number of jobs (and thus the pool of available workers), Ybor encouraged other cigar manufacturers to move to his new colony by offering cheap land and a free factory building if they agreed to meet certain job-creation quotas. Even with these inducements, cigar workers and other cigar manufacturers were slow in coming to what was still a primitive settlement - few were willing to take the risk of moving to and buying a home in a new place that might not last.

On April 13, 1886, Haya's factory produced the first Ybor City cigar. Ybor's factory followed suit a few days later. At the time, they still had less than 100 employees between them.

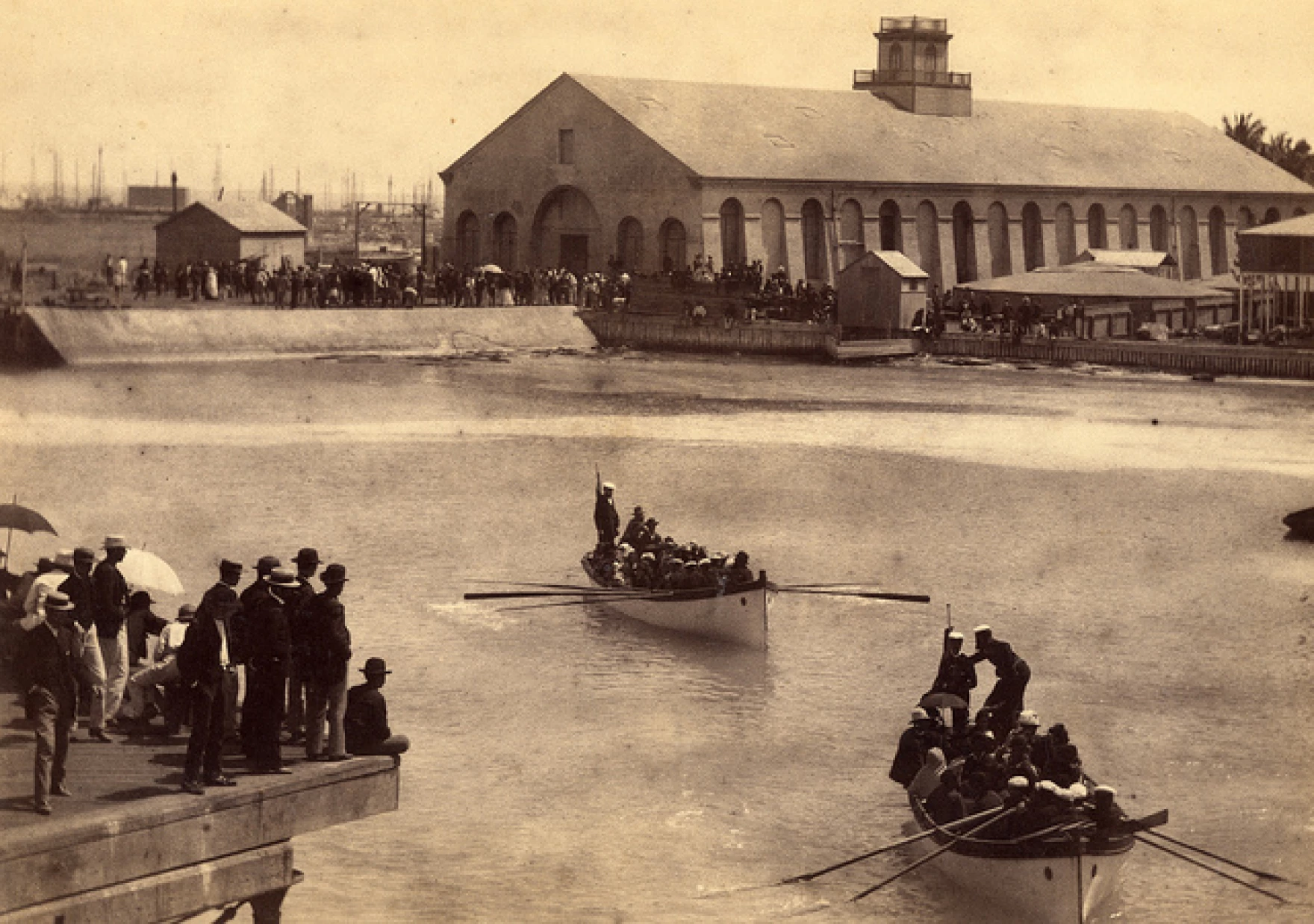
Cuban workers leaving Key West by Spanish ships after the fire of April 1886.

Later in the same month, the Great Fire of Key West ravaged much of the city. Hundreds of homes and several cigar factories were destroyed, including Ybor's still-operational main location. Needing jobs and not willing to wait for their homes and workplaces to be rebuilt, many tabaqueros decided to pack up their surviving belongings and board a steamship for Tampa. The fire also encouraged several Key West cigar manufacturers to either build a branch factory in Ybor City or relocate altogether. Cigar makers in New York and Cuba also took note, and many followed suit in the coming years.

More available jobs in the cigar industry attracted more residents. Cigar workers found ready employment in the ever-growing number of large factories and small storefront shops ("buckeyes") and came in ever-growing numbers. More immigration meant more amenities such as a wider range of businesses and more opportunities for social and cultural events, which in turn attracted more new residents, which attracted more businesses, etc. This cycle of growth lasted until the late 1920s, by which time Ybor City was home to hundreds of cigar making businesses and tens of thousands of permanent residents and had a thriving cultural scene.

By the end of 1886, Ybor's and Haya's factories had combined to produce over 1,000,000 hand-rolled cigars in just over six months. This number would be dwarfed in the years to come.

== Early Ybor City: 1886–1901 ==
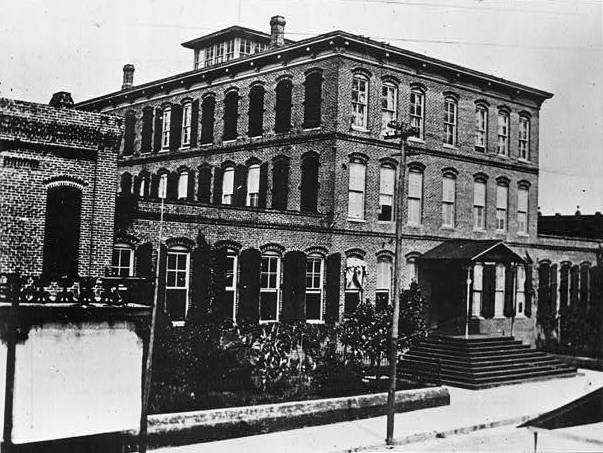
World's largest cigar factory, 1902

Sandy street in Ybor City, 1886

=== From frontier town to bustling neighborhood ===
In 1888, Ybor completed an imposing 3-story brick building which was the largest cigar factory in the world at the time, and in 1897 he opened The Florida Brewing Company building which was the tallest building in Tampa until 1913. But for the most part, the Ybor City that greeted the first arrivals was primitive.

Structures in the new town were mainly wooden and quickly built. Unpaved streets of thick sand made travel difficult, especially by wagon. There were no sidewalks or streetlights, and nighttime travelers often carried a lantern to find their way and a gun for protection from alligators, bears, panthers, or other wildlife that often wandered into town from the surrounding swamps, forests, and scrubland. As an early resident observed, "What we found when we arrived was a stinking hole with swamps and pestilence everywhere."

As is typical in boom towns, many of the first residents of Ybor City were either unmarried men or men who had left their families behind (if only temporarily) to take jobs in a place where work was plentiful but living conditions were rough. These pioneers began the process of developing the community. As another early resident explains, "[the first immigrants] did not arrive in a city where they found work; they created a city out of the work they did."

By 1887, Tampa city leaders had expressed concern about the lack of a trained police force in the rapidly growing "wild frontier town". They also saw the potential to greatly increase the city's tax rolls by gaining control of the prosperous community that had suddenly sprouted just outside the city limits. So on June 2, 1887, Tampa annexed Ybor City over the protestations of Ybor himself, who felt that relinquishing civil authority would add nothing to his company town except new regulations and red tape.

In spite (or because) of its new status as a "city within a city", by the turn of the 20th century, Ybor City had many fine brick buildings, paved streets with streetlights, a streetcar line connecting it to Tampa and other nearby communities, and ever-expanding cultural and social opportunities.

The civic improvements were made possible by Ybor City's effect on Tampa's revenue. In 1885, the annual export-import duties collected at Tampa's port totaled $683. In 1895, they totaled over $625,000, due almost entirely to the importing of fine Cuban tobacco and the exporting of Tampa-made cigars.

==== Rapid growth and diversification ====
Tampa's city budget was not the only number that experienced tremendous growth after Ybor City's annexation. From less than 800 residents in 1880, the population of Tampa had risen to over 5000 in 1890 and almost 16,000 in 1900. The vast majority of these new residents were immigrants who had settled in Ybor City.

One factor that expedited the city's growth was US immigration policy of the time. While thousands of immigrants from all over the world were carefully screened at major immigrant processing centers like Angel Island in San Francisco and Ellis Island in New York City, there were few restrictions on immigration from Cuba, and the restrictions that existed were laxly enforced at the port of Tampa.

With few impediments, the flow of Cuban and Spanish workers and their families back and forth between Florida and Cuba was both substantial and largely undocumented. Despite V.M. Ybor's efforts to anchor his employees in Tampa through home ownership, many Ybor City cigar workers were still open to heading back to Cuba to seek out better wages and conditions into the 1890s. Due to this divided national loyalty, it would be years before many of the early residents of Ybor City became American citizens, and many never saw reason to apply at all. In the largely insular community, immigrants could live surrounded by their own culture, so attachment to their countries of origin remained high, especially in the first generation.

===== Diversification =====
The population of Ybor City diversified through the late 1880s and early 1890s as an influx of Italian immigrants began to arrive. Almost all of them were originally from the poverty-stricken Sicilian towns of Alessandria Della Rocca and Santo Stefano Quisquina, though many had first tried to find work in New Orleans, New York City, or the sugar cane fields of the Kissimmee/St. Cloud area in central Florida before relocating to Tampa. Arriving around the same time were a small number of Jewish immigrants, mainly Romanians and Germans escaping religious persecution and looking for economic opportunities.

Not having cigar making experience, they were unable to break into the tightly self-regulated industry in any numbers. As they tried to learn Spanish (the language of Ybor City) and English (the language of the rest of Tampa), they initially took whatever work they could find. Eventually, many opened businesses catering to the cigar factories and their workers. Most notable among these were successful grocery, clothing, and general goods stores; cigar box and cigar box art firms; and vegetable and dairy farms established in rural areas a few miles east of the city.

=== Cuba Libre ===
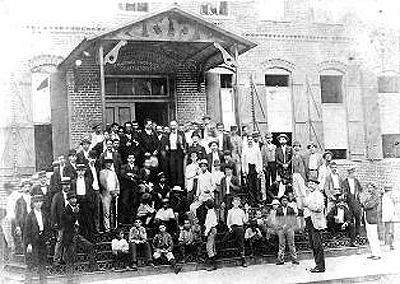
Jose Marti (center) with cigar workers on the steps of V.M. Ybor's cigar factory, 1893

Before 1900, a majority of the residents of early Ybor City considered themselves Cuban, with Spaniards comprising the second largest group. Consequently, the ongoing Cuban struggle for independence from Spanish colonial rule was a topic of intense interest and constant tension in the immigrant community.

The issue had caused controversy right from the start. In 1886, Vicente Martinez-Ybor's cigar factory had been the first to be built and equipped. However, the start of production was delayed because his Cuban workers refused to work for a Spanish foreman who had earned an anti-Cuban reputation in Key West. Only after the offending supervisor was replaced (and after Ignacio Haya's factory had already rolled the first Ybor City cigars) would V.M. Ybor's workers return to their benches.

When Cuba seemed poised to erupt again in the early 1890s, Ybor City became a vital source of funds, equipment, and inspiration for the independence-seekers. "El dia pa la patria" ("one day for the homeland") - donating one day's pay per week to the Cuban cause - became a patriotic duty for Tampa's Cuban population, with some of their Italian, Jewish, and even Spanish neighbors chipping in.

Jose Marti, the "Apostle of Cuban Independence", visited Ybor City and West Tampa many times, delivering several passionate speeches to audiences of thousands. One 1893 speech from the steps of Ybor's factory was reprinted in newspapers all over the US and Cuba and led directly to war. A few Tampa residents volunteered to fight alongside Marti in Cuba, and many lost their lives in 1895 during the same skirmish that killed their inspirational leader.

Donations and organizing continued among Tampa's Latin population through 1898, when the US entered the ongoing struggle and it escalated into the larger Spanish–American War. Henry Plant used his contacts in the War Department to make Tampa the main port of embarkation for US forces on their way to the conflict, providing a huge economic boost both to his railroad line and to Tampa as a whole. Over 30,000 troops (about double Tampa's total population at the time) and thousands of railcars full of supplies arrived to await orders to ship out, providing sudden prosperity for local businesses but stretching the small town's resources to the limit.

The troops were particularly welcome in Ybor City by Cubans who surmised that "Cuba Libre" was finally within reach. They were correct. The war lasted only a few months, and ended with Spain losing most of her remaining colonial possessions.

Some Cubans jubilantly left Tampa for their homeland, eager to enjoy the fruits of their long-fought revolution. However, most of these would eventually return. The main factors in their decision was the lack of economic opportunities and general devastation resulting from years of conflict, and the realization that Spanish colonial control had simply been replaced by American neo-colonial control. As a group, they overwhelmingly choose to put down roots and settle in Ybor City for the long term, though some migration for family and work reasons continued.

== The "Golden Age": 1902–1929 ==
With the turn of the 20th century, the perception of Ybor City residents had evolved. Previously, many residents had thought of Tampa as a temporary place to work and live; a refuge from the political and/or economic troubles in their homelands. By the early 1900s, however, attitudes had changed. Ybor City had become a permanent home.

One major factor was the neighborhood's high quality of life. Like most immigrant communities at the time, Ybor City had everything a recent arrival could need: work, shops, schools, churches, and most importantly, other immigrants who shared the language and customs of the old country. But unlike most U.S. immigrant enclaves of the period, Ybor City was no slum.

The "Latin" residents of Ybor City created a bustling community that combined Cuban, Spanish, Italian, and Jewish culture into a unique mix. "Ybor City is Tampa's Spanish India," observed a visitor to the area, "What a colorful, screaming, shrill, and turbulent world." Distinctive red brick and iron balconied architecture defined the neighborhood's look. Meanwhile, a local cuisine emerged, including delicacies such as the deviled crab.

But it took more than pride to turn a sand-clogged primitive village into a thriving neighborhood; it took the financial resources of a prosperous industry. During the first decades of the 20th century, the port duties and the payrolls of Tampa's cigar manufacturers were the engine that made the city grow and prosper. Cigar workers, especially experienced rollers of the finer cigar varieties, made a good wage and could afford to frequent the many shops in downtown Tampa and in Ybor City's commercial district centered on 7th Avenue (La Séptima). The tabaquero culture emphasized professionalism and encouraged "tasteful appreciation of the finer things in life", much to the appreciation of Tampa's shopkeepers.

By producing hundreds of millions of hand-rolled cigars annually (the peak was 500,000,000 in 1929, right before the Great Depression took hold), the cigar workers of Ybor City not only made a good life for themselves, but also pumped millions of dollars into the coffers of local businesses and city government.

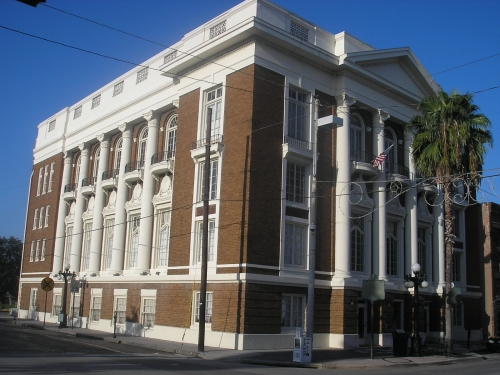
L'Unione Italiana (The Italian Club)

=== The Mutual Aid Societies (social clubs) ===
Mutual aid societies and social clubs were used to improve life for the residents of Ybor City and have been called the "heart" of Ybor City. The longest-lasting of these organizations were the Deutscher-Americaner (German-American Club), L'Unione Italiana (Italian Club), La Union Martí-Maceo, Circulo Cubano (Cuban Club), El Centro Español, and El Centro Asturiano. These clubs were founded in Ybor City's early days (with Centro Español established first in 1891) as places where new arrivals could find support and community among other people from their country of origin. As time went on, they offered a broader range of social and entertainment opportunities.

Despite the immigrant element, Ybor City's mutual aid clubs had less in common with aid associations such as Hull House and other settlement houses than with benefit societies and fraternal organizations. Ybor City's social clubs were founded by immigrants for the benefit of immigrants. The funds to build the large and often opulent clubhouses and to operate the organizations came from dues collected from members, usually about 5% of a member's salary.

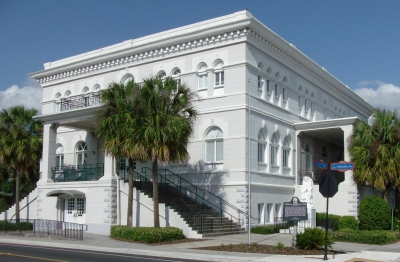
The German-American (Deutscher-Americaner) Club

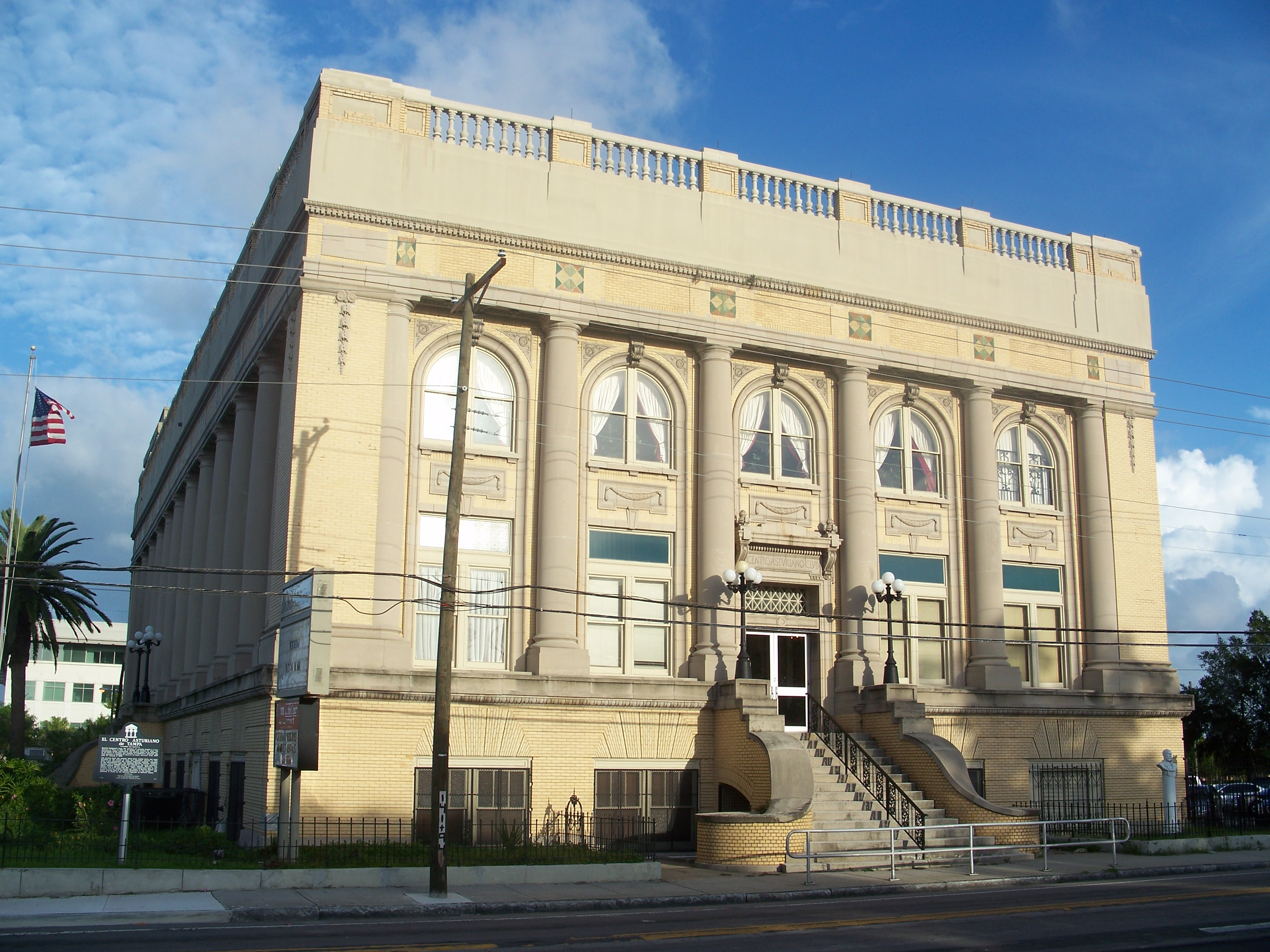
El Centro Asturiano

While the clubs provided a place to socialize, the main reason they were founded was to provide basic medical care for their members. Medical care at Ybor City clinics was included for the price of weekly dues, and two of the clubs (El Centro Asturiano and El Centro Español) also established hospitals. In the days before medical insurance, this benefit was a compelling reason for residents to join.

Besides medical care, the clubs offered many social activities. Club buildings housed gymnasiums, cantinas (small cafés for members), and large auditoriums for concerts and often elaborate theatrical performances. They also organized events such as dances and picnics, sometimes hiring buses for outings at Ballast Point Park, Clearwater Beach, or other locations outside of Ybor City itself. An active club filled a family's social calendar, and collectively, they served as extended families and communal gathering places for generations of Ybor City residents.

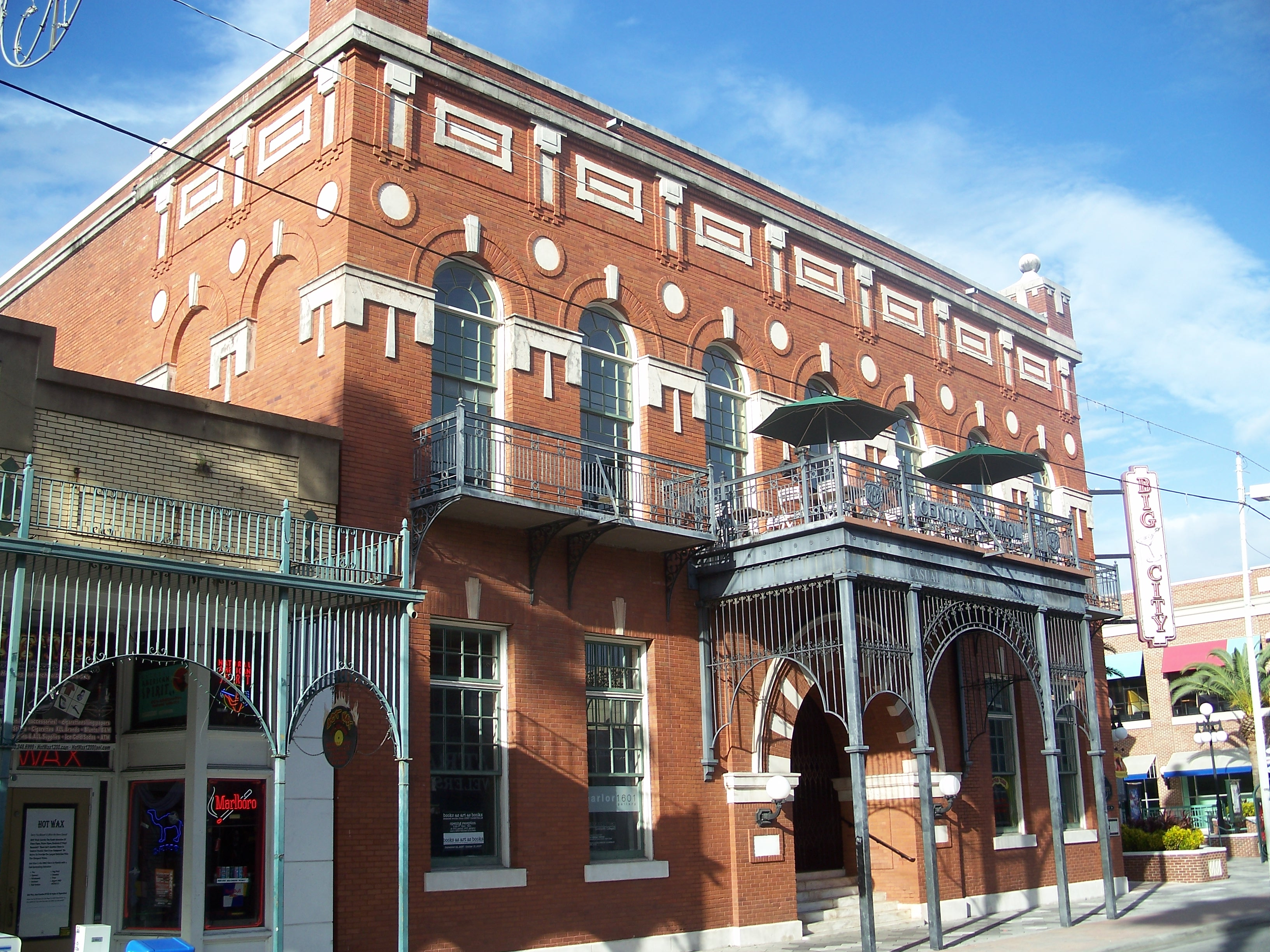
El Centro Español de Tampa

The clubs were open to those of particular descent: the Italian Club for Italians, El Centro Español for Spaniards, and so on. Two notable situations were the existence of two distinct clubs for Cubans and the spinoff club founded by northern Spaniards, El Centro Asturiano.

Though racism among the residents of Ybor City was not generally an issue, it was situated in the American Deep South in the era of Jim Crow, so the clubs had to follow the segregationist laws of Tampa. Local law required that darker-skinned and lighter-skinned people not socialize publicly.

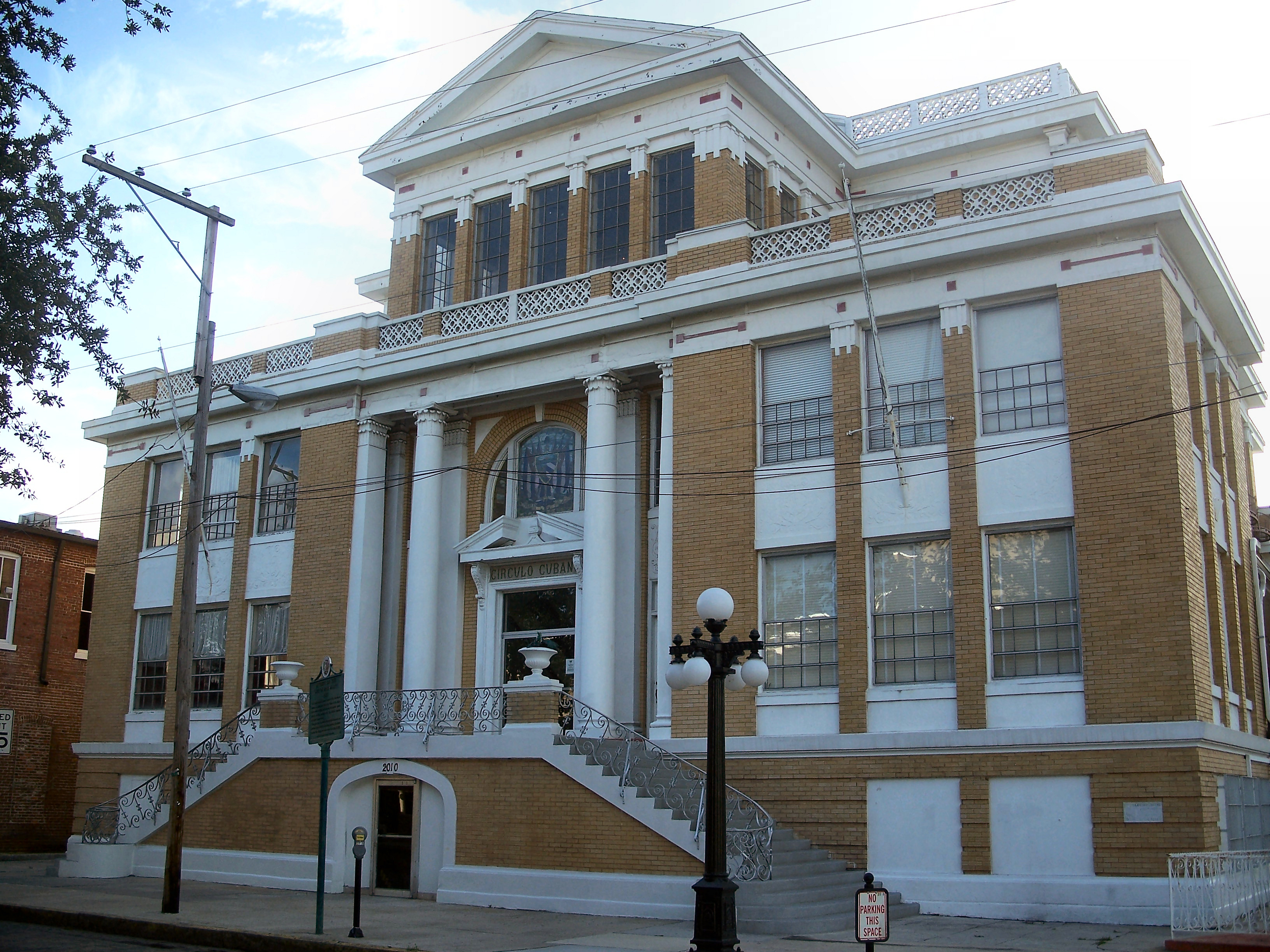
Circulo Cubano (Cuban Club)

Because of these laws, Ybor City's Cuban community organized two main clubs: La Union Martí-Maceo for darker-skinned Cubans and Circulo Cubano for those with lighter skin. But Ybor's Cuban immigrants were often racially mixed, and skin tones within a family might cover a range of human colorations. This sometimes led to members of the same family being required to join different clubs. Members of Martí-Maceo often found acceptance and upward mobility harder to achieve in the larger Anglo community than their counterparts in Circulo Cubano. And when the 1960s federal Urban Renewal program attempted to redevelop Ybor City, their club building was the only one to be demolished.

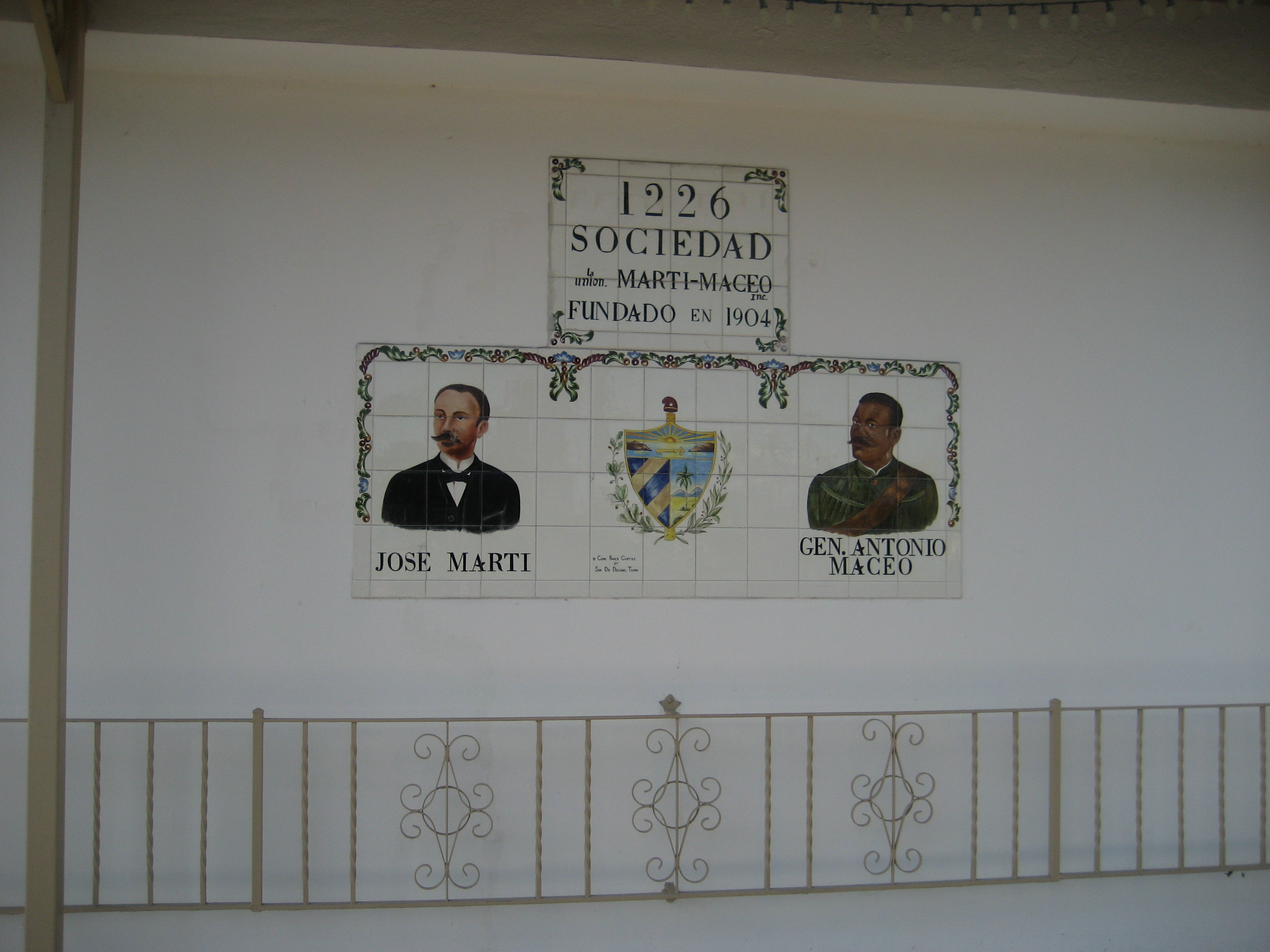
Sign on current Marti-Maceo building

El Centro Asturiano was founded by immigrants from Asturias, a province of northern Spain, who split from the Centro Español and formed a Tampa branch of El Centro Asturiano Club of Havana. However, unlike the other clubs, membership was soon opened to all people of Latin descent who wanted to join. Because of this and the fact that the club built a well-respected hospital, it consistently had the largest membership of all the clubs.

=== El Lector ===
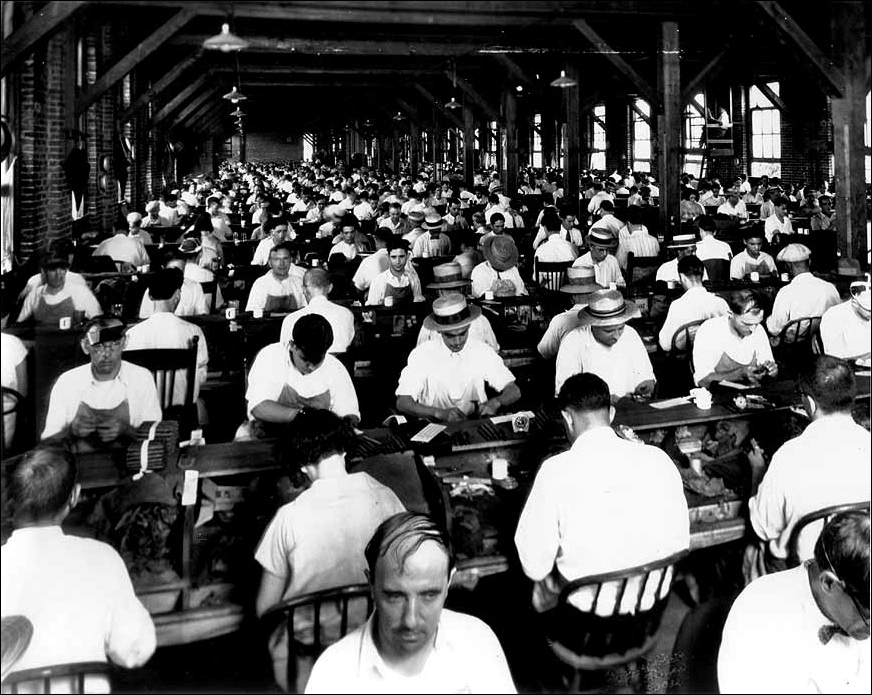
Ybor cigar rollers ply their craft c. 1920. Note Lector on elevated reading platform, background right

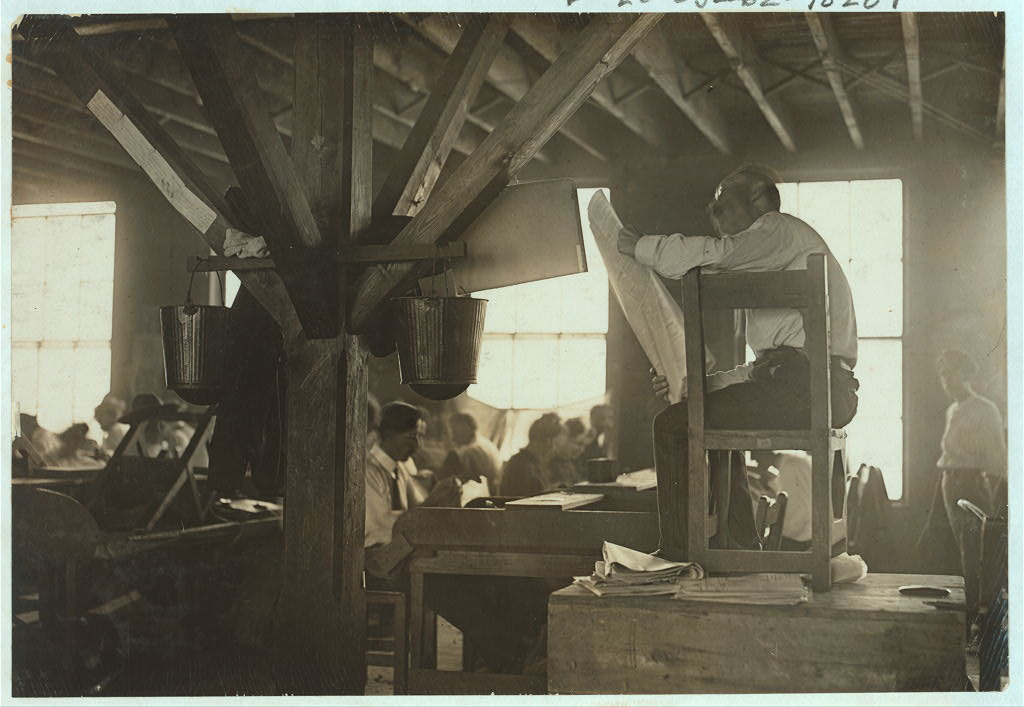
A lector reader, Tampa January 1909

One tradition that the tabaqueros brought with them from cigar factories in Cuba was that of El Lector (The Reader). Because the job of rolling cigar after cigar could become monotonous, the workers wanted something to occupy and stimulate the mind. Thus arose the tradition of "lectors", who sat perched on an elevated platform in the cigar factory, reading to the workers.

Typically, the lector would start the day reading local Spanish newspapers and some fiction, such as a romance or adventure novel. Since most residents of Ybor were very interested in politics, the lector would then usually move on to political treatises or writings about the current events in Cuba or Spain or other countries. In the afternoon, the selection was often a literary novel, such as Don Quixote or other works of classic literature. (In Nilo Cruz's Pulitzer Prize-winning play Anna in the Tropics set in Ybor City, Tolstoy's Anna Karenina is read.) Because of the lector system, even cigar workers who could not read were exposed to classic literature and were conversant on political philosophy and current events both in Ybor City and around the world.

Lectors were well respected and often highly educated. Most could look at text written in English or Italian and read it aloud in Spanish, the language of the factories. The lectors were hired and fired by the tabaqueros, not the factory owners. Their salary was paid directly by the workers through a small deduction from everyone's weekly earnings. Despite the cost, the tabaqueros enthusiastically sustained the lector tradition.

Most factory owners were less supportive. They felt that the lectors stirred up their workforce by fostering "radical ideas". Lectors who shared news of labor conditions or problems in other locations sometimes led to worker walkouts and protests on many occasions. More than one owner tried to ban lectors from his factory floor, leading to bitter strikes as the employees fought for the right to have a lector.

The lectors would remain fixtures in Tampa's cigar factories until 1921, when several owners negotiated the removal of the lectors as part of an agreement to end a labor strike. At the end of a particularly bitter strike in 1931, workers in all Ybor City and West Tampa cigar factories were forced to agree to the removal of lectors.

Some of the lectors continued to speak to the cigar workers in other ways. Victoriano Manteiga, for example, founded La Gaceta, a tri-lingual (English, Spanish, and Italian) newspaper which is still published by his grandson in Tampa. Some took other jobs, becoming teachers or regular tabaqueros. Some went to Cuba to seek lector positions in factories which still allowed the practice.

=== Organized Crime ===
Bolita was an illegal lottery game run by organized criminals that was very popular in Tampa, especially Ybor City, during the first half of the 20th century. The game operated openly and with virtual impunity thanks to regular bribes and kickbacks to key local politicians and law enforcement officials. Charlie Wall, a member of a prominent "Anglo" Tampa family and son of a former mayor, organized bolita into an extremely profitable business in the late 1920s, and his organization soon diversified into bootlegging, casino gambling, prostitution, and other illegal ventures from his base of operations in Ybor City.

The 1930s were a time of rampant corruption in Tampa, with many accusations of stolen elections and mayors on the payrolls of rival organized crime factions. After a time known locally as the "Era of Blood" in which local criminal interests fought over control, Santo Trafficante, Sr. pushed Wall aside and emerged as Tampa and Ybor City's leading crime boss in the 1940s. Later, his son Santo Trafficante, Jr. allegedly extended the family's influence far beyond the area.

This era of rampant corruption wound down with increased federal law enforcement efforts beginning in the 1950s. Although few of the resulting trials resulted in convictions and some mob-related activity continued, the sense of lawlessness in Ybor City and Tampa in general gradually diminished.

== Decline ==
=== The Depression Era ===
The markedly decreased demand for cigars during the Great Depression of the 1930s had serious consequences for Ybor City. Many smokers found themselves unable to afford luxury items and switched to cheaper cigarettes, weakening the neighborhood's dominant industry and starting the area on a slow economic and social decline.

As occurred elsewhere, many businesses laid off workers or closed altogether and many banks failed. To help keep food on the table during hard times, many residents of Ybor City plowed under their yards or vacant lots to plant vegetables and bought cows, goats, and chickens to provide milk, eggs, and meat for the family, with any surplus sold around town. The descendants of those chickens still roam the area.

==== Tampa and the Spanish Civil War ====
During the Spanish Civil War of 1936–1939, the cry of "No pasaran!" energized Ybor City much as the cause of Cuba Libre had done so 40 years previously. The community overwhelmingly supported the democratically elected government of Republican Spain in its fight against the fascist uprising led by General Franco, and many residents donated 10% of their salary and tons of old clothes to the Republican cause. Ybor City during the war had the 2nd largest pro-Republican Spanish speaking population in the United States. A cigar worker turned the slogan of the Republicans, No pasaran! (They shall not pass!), into a song which was sung at rallies in both Tampa and in Spain. In Tampa "at least two dozen" volunteers for the Republicans were recruited. Most of the Spanish speaking members of the Lincoln Battalion, came from Ybor City or New York City. Over 1/3rd of the Tampa volunteers were Cubans and became members of a company led by Antonio Guiteras.

The news that Franco's forces had triumphed in 1939 was crushing news in Ybor City. Besides the disappointment about the failure of a fervently supported cause, the end of the war cut many ties between Spanish residents of Ybor City and their mostly Republican families back in Spain. In some cases, their relatives had been killed, either during the war or in Franco's post-war purge of political opponents. In other cases, Franco's tightening control and the coming of World War II made communication difficult or impossible. In either case, links back to the mother country, which had been waning as the second generation of Ybor City residents came of age, were further weakened.

=== Post World War II ===
After World War II, the slow decline of the neighborhood which had begun in the early 1930s accelerated, as veterans returning home from service found a neighborhood with little economic opportunity and little prospects for improvement, leading many to relocate outside of Ybor City. Several factors played a role in that process.

For one, the worldwide demand for cigars had not returned to pre-Depression levels, and many factories that had closed in the 1930s remained shuttered and empty. By 1945, the cigar industry in Tampa employed less than half the number of the workers than it had in 1935, when the Depression had already decreased the workforce from the peak level of 1929.

The quantity and quality of jobs in the cigar industry would continue to fall as Tampa's manufacturers underwent a near-universal shift to mechanization. Replacing traditional hand-rolled cigars with machine-made varieties allowed cigar firms to employ fewer workers and pay them less. Even when demand quickly increased to record levels during American's post-war boom, the number of workers employed in Ybor City's factories continued to decrease due to more efficient machines. By then, Tampa's economy was buoyed by other industries such as shipping and tourism. However, little new activity had replaced cigar manufacturing in Ybor City, and job seekers often had to look elsewhere for employment.

Another issue in Ybor City after World War II was the aging of the area's housing stock. New construction had all but stopped during the Depression and the war, and thousands of homes built during the neighborhood's era of rapid growth around 1900 were still in use. These old wooden structures were becoming dilapidated and were thus not particularly attractive to first-time home buyers such as returning veterans, who tended to gravitate to West Tampa or the booming suburbs of Tampa.

The Veterans Administration encouraged this trend by offering mortgage loans on new homes at very favorable rates to returning vets. Since there were few new homes or empty lots for new construction available in Ybor City, veterans who wanted a VA loan were also pushed to buy elsewhere.

Finally, the G.I. Bill made it possible for many Ybor City-born veterans to get a college education and start a career outside of the dying local cigar industry. While many of these eventually settled back in Tampa after finishing school, few could find suitable employment in their old neighborhood and relocated as well. For all these reasons, Ybor City's WWII generation was the first to leave the area in large numbers since Vicente Martinez-Ybor had first cleared the scrubland in 1885.

==== Urban Renewal ====
Empty lot in Ybor City

The period from the late 1950s to the early 1970s saw two seemingly contradictory trends in Ybor City history. While the neighborhood was dying, two of its native sons, Nick Nuccio and Dick Greco, became the first "Latins" to serve as mayor of Tampa. Despite this newfound political clout, Ybor City stagnated and declined. As its cigar industry continued to consolidate, mechanize, and cut workforce, its population steadily moved to other parts of Tampa (especially West Tampa) or out of the Tampa area altogether.

The Federal Urban Renewal Program of the 1960s were supposed to revitalize Ybor City with new residences and businesses designed to attract tourists to "Tampa's Latin Quarter" (a nod to the French Quarter in New Orleans). Thousands of remaining residents were forced to move as entire blocks of old homes, business, and cigar factories were razed. Due to a lack of funds and political will, however, the replacement construction never took place, and old buildings were replaced by empty lots.

Another blow was the construction of Interstate 4, which cut east–west across the approximate center of the neighborhood. Besides resulting in the demolition of even more homes and other structures, the highway cut most of the north–south routes through the area.

==== Cuban embargo ====
Ybor City's cigar industry had been in decline for years by the early 1960s, but the most serious blow of all came in February 1962, when rising tensions between Fidel Castro's Cuban government and the United States led to an embargo on all imports from Cuba, including tobacco. Faced with the sudden end of the supply of "Havana clear" tobacco leaves that had long been used to make the vast majority of Tampa cigars, many cigar manufacturing operations shut down, further damaging Ybor City's economy and prompting more residents to leave the neighborhood. An era had come to an end, and the neighborhood became a collection of vacant cigar factories, empty storefronts, and deserted sidewalks.

==== Decline of the mutual aide societies ====
With the emptying of Ybor City in the 1950s and 1960s and the passing away of the first generations of immigrants, membership in Ybor City's mutual aide societies declined, and the clubs' offerings and amenities fell accordingly. By the 21st century, most survive as archival projects with very few members or services.

The German-American Club shut down due to anti-German sentiments before World War II. Its building was used by the Young Men's Hebrew Association for several decades, and was subsequently purchased and remodeled by the city of Tampa in the late 1990s for city office space. El Centro Español ceased most operations in the late 1980s. After sitting vacant for several years, its building on 7th Ave. was restored and is now part of the Centro Ybor shopping/entertainment complex, and its branch clubhouse in West Tampa was partially restored to house the Hillsborough Education Foundation. The original home of the Marti-Maceo Club was demolished in 1965 by Urban Renewal (sardonically referred to as "Urban Removal" by its members) and the club is now housed in a former firehouse on 7th Avenue.

The remaining clubs have greatly reduced their benefits and focus most of their resources on preserving their history and buildings. The Cuban Club, Centro Asturiano, and Italian Club buildings have been at least partially restored using club dues, various fund raisers, rental fees on their ballrooms and theaters, and preservation grants.

=== Empty lots, empty plans ===
With the local cigar industry collapsing and federal redevelopment funds drying up by the late 1960s, local leaders struggled to find ways to revitalize the historic Ybor City neighborhood. Several proposals sought to convert vacant land and buildings into urban residences, shopping areas, or tourist attractions. For example, Mayor Dick Greco suggested digging canals and importing gondolas to create an attraction that simulated Venice, Italy. Another idea was a 1967 scheme to convert the center of the neighborhood into an "Old Spain"-themed attraction enclosed in a medieval "walled city" and featuring "bloodless" bullfighting. Organizers staged an exhibition bullfight, but the bull escaped and had to be killed by a sheriff's deputy with a high-powered rifle. The theme park proposal died along with the bull. Due to a lack of money and popular support, none of these ideas got past the planning stages.

By the early 1970s, very few businesses and residents remained in the formerly bustling commercial center of Ybor City around 7th Avenue, most notably the Columbia Restaurant The northern portion of the neighborhood (now known as V.M. Ybor), which had been separated by I-4, still had a substantial population, but a clear demographic shift had occurred. The area changed from a predominately middle-class Latino neighborhood to one that was predominately working poor and African American. Urban Renewal had not touched northern Ybor City, and a majority of residents lived in decaying small homes which had been built for new immigrants in the early 1900s.

== Redevelopment ==
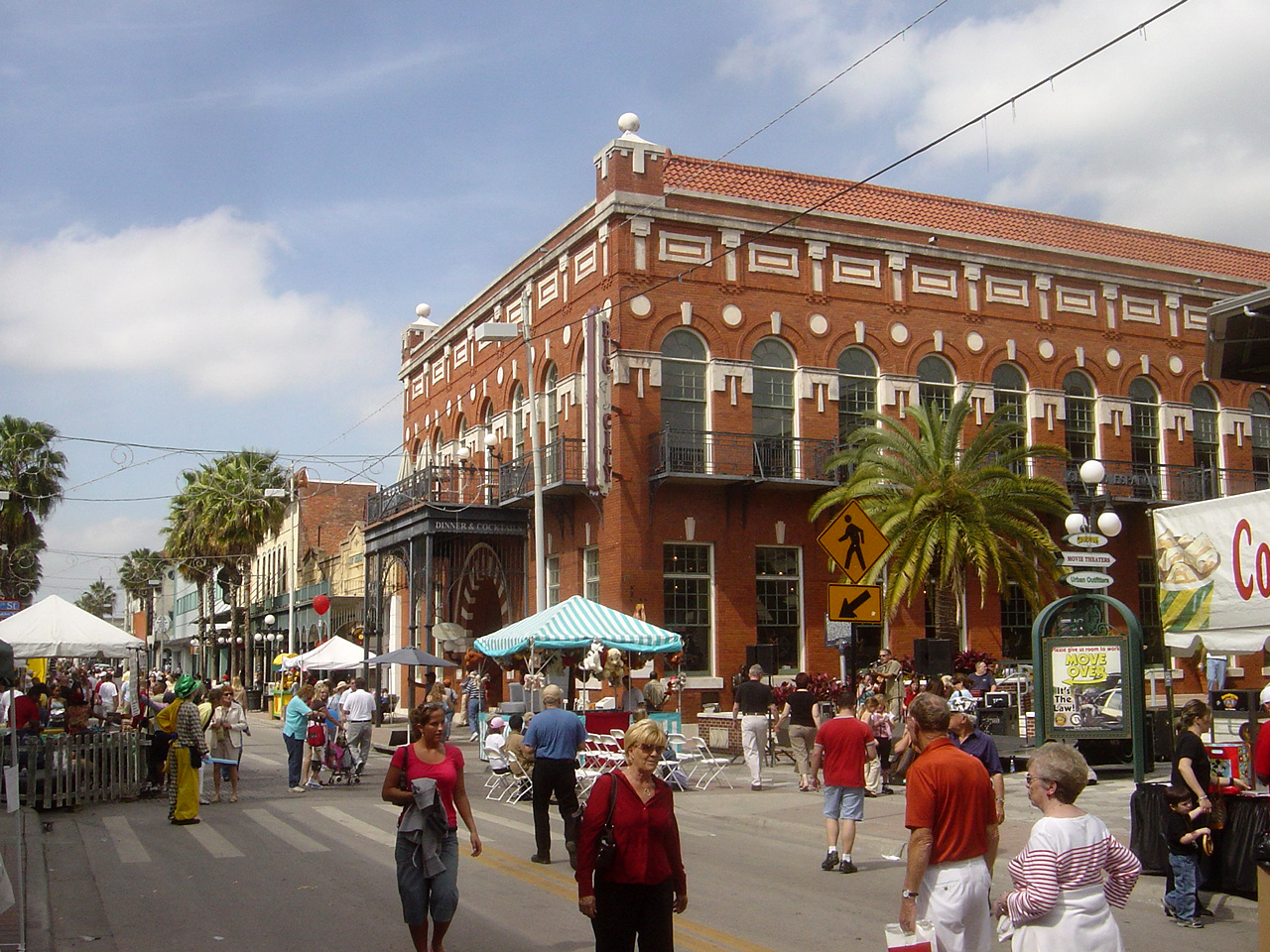
Street festival, 2006. Large building was once Centro Español Club, now part of Centro Ybor

Starting in the late 1980s, an influx of artists seeking interesting and inexpensive studio quarters began converting long-vacant storefronts along 7th Avenue into studio and gallery space, leading to a period of commercial gentrification.

By the early 1990s, many of these same old brick buildings on 7th Avenue had been converted into bars, restaurants, nightclubs, and other nightlife attractions. The crowds grew until portions of the old neighborhood became a nighttime carnival, especially on weekends. The city built parking garages and closed 7th Ave. to traffic to deal with the growth in visitors.

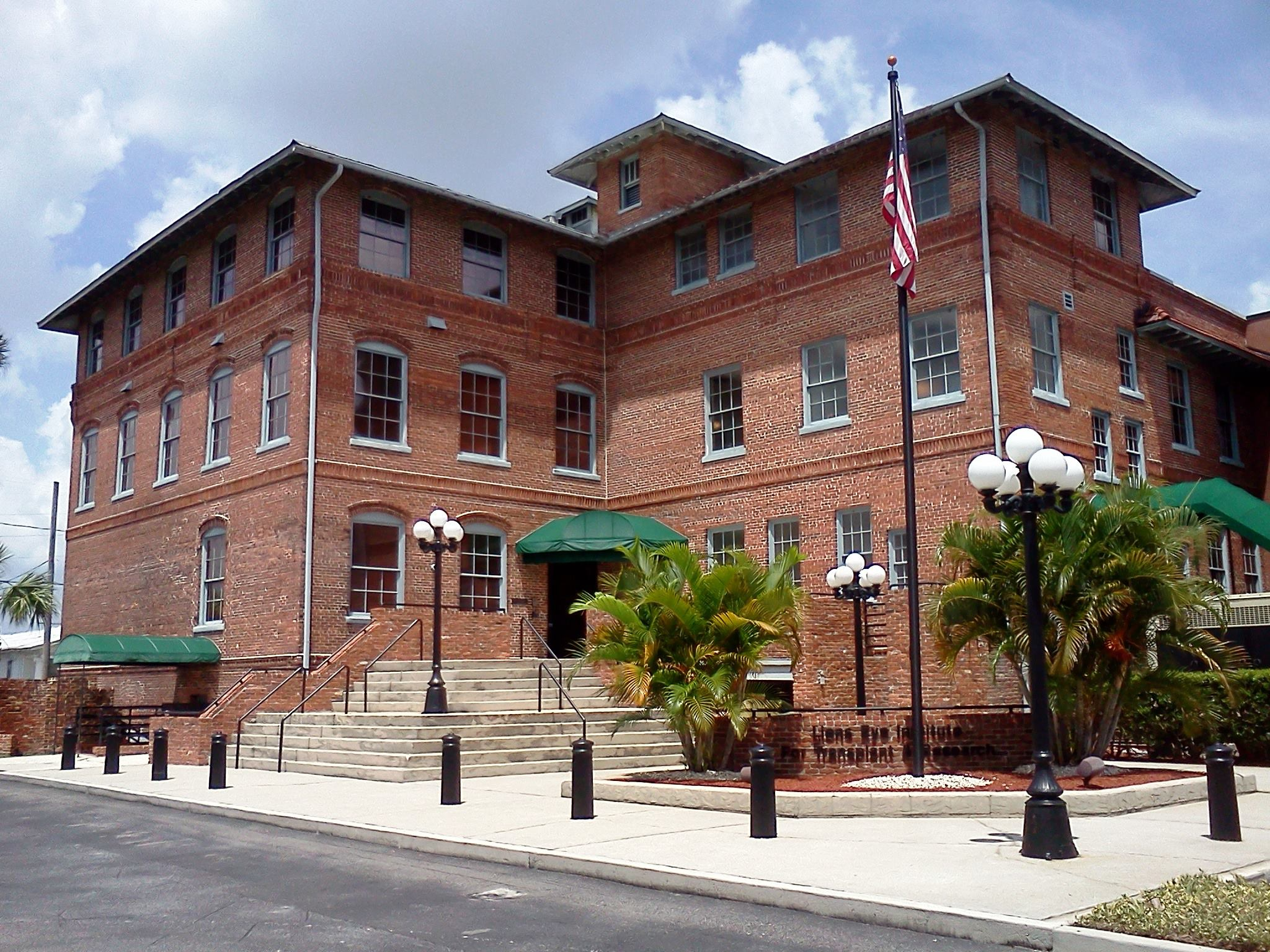
F. Lorenzo cigar factory in Ybor City

Despite the positive aspects, some residents and leaders became concerned about the disruption from the revelry and traffic. Since around 2000, the City of Tampa has encouraged a broader emphasis in development. A family-oriented shopping complex and movie theater (Centro Ybor) has opened in the former Centro Español social club. New apartments, condominiums and a hotel have been built on the empty lots, along with residences and hotels now occupying restored buildings. In 2009, IKEA opened Florida's largest IKEA store on 22nd Street just north of the Selmon Expressway. People were moving back to the area around once-vibrant 7th Avenue for the first time in many years.

The recovery has not impacted different portions of historic Ybor City equally nor at the same rate. While the once-abandoned commercial district south of Interstate 4 underwent much redevelopment during the 1990s, populated areas north of I-4 and east of 22nd St. did not. Despite years of public and private attempts to spur economic growth, urban decay and high poverty have long been widespread in this area, with many residents still living in former cigar workers' homes built almost a century ago.

From 2000 to 2009, gentrification and redevelopment slowly began to spread to the current V.M. Ybor neighborhood located north and west of the Ybor City Historic District. During the period, the poverty rate in this area dropped from over 40% to about 13%.

Most Tampa cigar factories were made of wood and by 2018, only two such structures remained: the Oliva factory, totally renovated and converted into apartments, and the Salvador Rodriguez Co. on 22nd St. S. in the Palmetto Beach area, now an office building.

The local museum is the Ybor City Museum State Park in the former Ferlita Bakery building (originally La Joven Francesca) building on 9th Avenue. Tours of the gardens and the "casitas" (small homes of cigar company workers) are provided by a ranger. Exhibits, period photos and a video cover the founding of Ybor City and the cigar making industry.

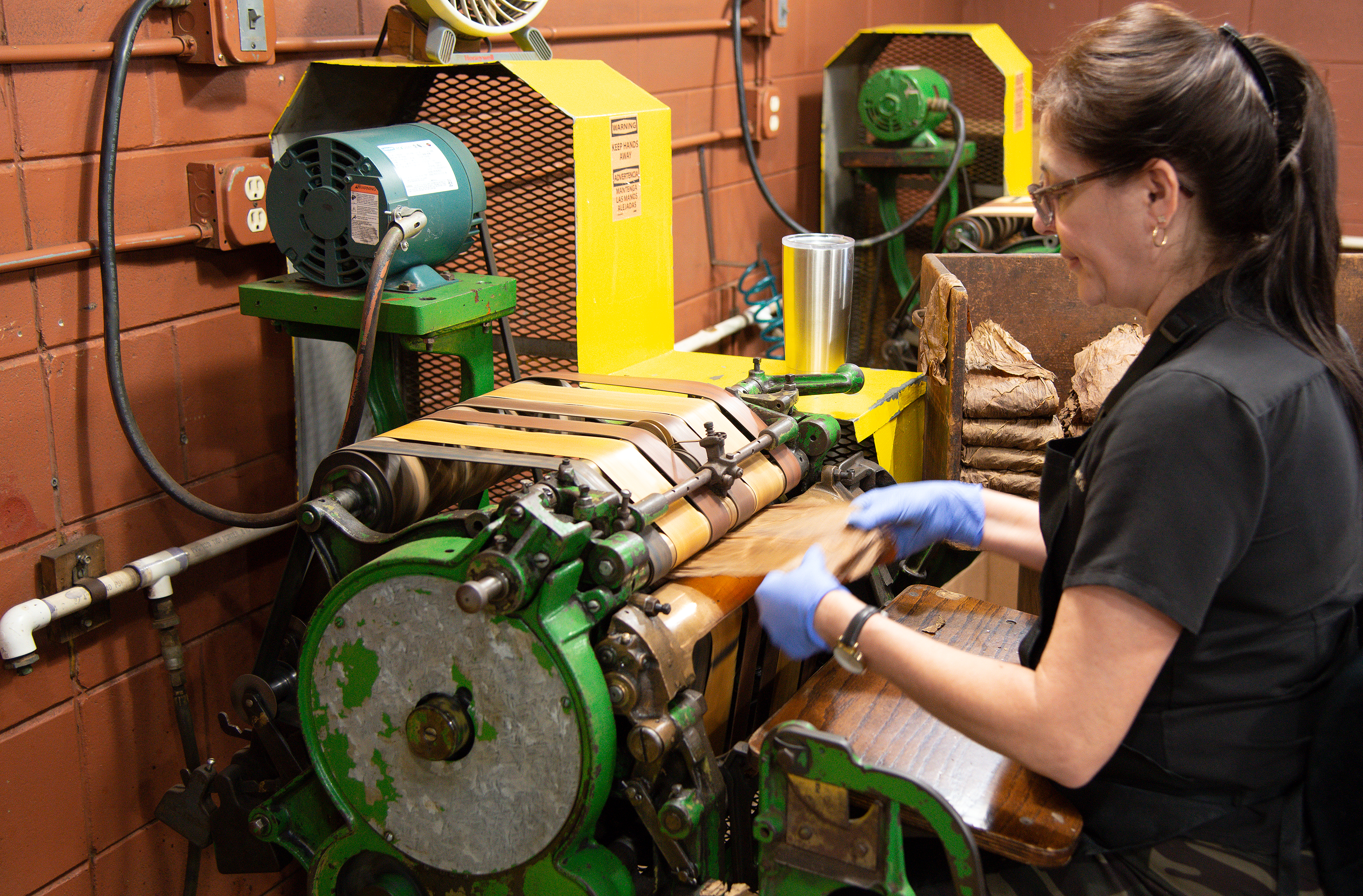
Cigar making with a hand operated 1930s machine at J.C. Newman Cigar Company, January 2023

In July 2018 the Tampa Bay Rays announced their plans to build their new stadium in Ybor city. In December 2018 the team announced that the Ybor City location was no longer viable.

As of 2023, one cigar factory was still in operation in Ybor City, the J. C. Newman Cigar Company, which moved to Tampa from Ohio in 1954 and took over the previous Regensburg cigar factory. The company was continuing to utilize some antique, hand-operated ARENCO and American Machine and Foundry cigarmaking machines from the 1930's.

== Bibliography ==
- Espinosa, Jack (2008). Cuban Bread Crumbs. Xlibris Corporation. ISBN 978-1-4257-9678-5.
- Greenbaum, Susan (2002). More than Black : Afro-Cubans in Tampa. Gainesville: University Press of Florida. ISBN 0-8130-2466-8.
- Ingalls, Robert (2003). Tampa Cigar Workers: A Pictorial History. Gainesville, FL: University Press of Florida. ISBN 0-8130-2602-4.
- Jamison, Gayla (Producer, director, Writer) (1987). Living in America: 100 Years of Ybor City (video documentary). Tampa, Fl: Lightfoot Films, Inc.
- Kerstein, Robert (2001). Politics and Growth in 20th Century Tampa. University Press of Florida. ISBN 0-8130-2083-2.
- Lastra, Frank (2006). Ybor City: The Making of a Landmark Town. University of Tampa Press. ISBN 1-59732-003-X.
- Leto, Emanuel (2001). Fraternidad: The Mutual Aid Societies of Ybor City. Tampa, FL: Ybor City Museum Society.
- Leto, Emanuel (2002). Hecho a Mano: Cigar Making in Tampa and Ybor City. Tampa, FL: Ybor City Museum Society.
- Mormino, Gary (1998). The Immigrant World of Ybor City. Gainesville, FL: University Press of Florida. ISBN 0-8130-1630-4.
- Mormino, Gary (2005). Land of Sunshine, State of Dreams. Gainesville, FL: University Press of Florida. ISBN 0-8130-2818-3.
- Muniz, Jose Rivero (1954). The Ybor City Story: 1885–1954. translated by E. Fernandez and H. Beltran (1976). University of Tampa.
- Pacheco, Ferdie (1994). Ybor City Chronicles. Gainesville, FL: University Press of Florida. ISBN 0-8130-1296-1.
- Patrick, Maureen (March–April 2007). "How We Got There: Immigration and Ybor City, 1886 - 1921". Cigar City Magazine. 2 (9): 26–35.
- Pizzo, Anthony; Mormino, Gary (1983). Tampa The Treasure City. Tulsa, OK: Continental Heritage Press. ISBN 0-932986-38-2.
- Tampa Bay History Center (2003). Hillsborough's Communities. Tampa Bay History Center. ISBN 1-930148-07-0.
- Thomas, Hugh (2003). The Spanish Civil War. London: Penguin. ISBN 0-14-101161-0. OCLC 248799351.
- Westfall, Loy G. (2000). Tampa Bay: Cradle of Cuban Liberty. Key West Cigar City USA. ISBN 9780966894820.
