= German-American Club of Tampa =

Historic German-American Club Building

Coordinates: 27.9636°N 82.4510°W

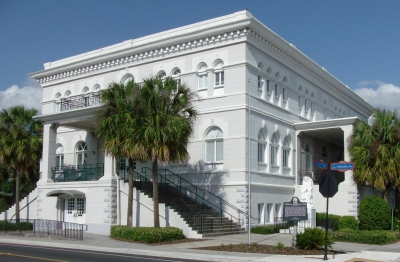
The German-American club in Ybor City, Tampa.

The German-American Club of Tampa (also known as the German-American Club, the German Club, and the Deutscher-Americaner) is a historic building that opened in 1909, serving as a community space for German, German-American, and Jewish people in Ybor City, Tampa, Florida. It is one of several historic mutual aid societies in Ybor that were constructed during the city's "Golden Age." Founding members of the German-American Club included the Maas family, owners of Maas Brothers department store, and four-term Tampa mayor Herman Glogowski.

== Architecture ==
This three-story building was designed in the Beaux Arts-style, which is a subset of the neoclassical movement in architecture. Its historic marker describes "fine classical details and proportions ... with concrete bock molded to appear as tooled stone masonry" in addition to exterior and interior Romanesque pillars.

== History ==
The German-American Club building has served many purposes, having served for over a century as a social club, mutual aid society, Hebrew Association, community health center and more in the Tampa Heights neighborhood.

=== The Official History ===
The building is labeled with a historic marker, which was sponsored in 1998 by The City of Tampa, Ybor City Development Corporation, and Florida Department of State Secretary of State, Sandra B. Mortham. The marker reads:

Organized in 1901, the German-American Club was one of the few non-Latin ethnic clubs in Tampa. Club members laid the cornerstone for a building on the northeast corner of Nebraska Avenue and 11th Street on February 23, 1908, followed by a grand opening on January 1, 1909. Fine classical details and proportions marked the three-story building, with concrete bock molded to appear as tooled stone masonry. With a stage for speakers or theatrical productions, a swimming pool and a bowling alley, the building served Tampa's German and Jewish population until its sale in 1919. From 1919 to 1924, it housed Tampa's Labor Temple Association. The Young Men's Hebrew Association bought the building in 1924 and remained until 1944. Focusing on education and recreation for Tampa's Jewish community, the association held gym, art, and music classes, and outdoor sports and leisure activities. Various groups including an insurance company and the Hispanic organization, Los Caballeros de la Luz, occupied the building after 1944.

=== A Raid on the German-American Club ===
The historic marker leaves out a dark moment in the German-American Club's history. In 1918, on Armistice Day at the end of World War I and fueled by anti-German sentiment, locals stormed the Club and defaced it. A 1997 Tampa Bay Times article on the subject recounts:

With hammers, rifles and steel bars swinging, the neighborhood men smashed their way into the club, an elegant stone building that sits on Nebraska Avenue at the edge of Ybor City. The hooligans punched out windows. They stomped apart chairs. And then, at the peak of their anti-Kaiser fury, the rowdies ripped out the busts of famous German intellectuals that lined the club's foyer and dragged them into the street.

The event marked the end of the building's affiliation with the German population in Tampa. Tampa's German-American Club chapter moved to a new location on Rome Avenue. Shortly thereafter, in 1919, the building was sold and passed between several owners over the following decades. By 1993, the building was in a state of disrepair when the City of Tampa foreclosed on it, after its owners failed to pay maintenance fines.

=== Renovations and Restorations ===
In 1997, then-Mayor of Tampa, Dick Greco – who had taken singing lessons at the Club as a child – led an initiative to restore the German-American Club and turn it into a municipal building. In order to fund the project without burdening taxpayers, the project was turned over to the Tampa Bay Economic Development Corporation (TEDCO). It eventually became home to the Sunshine State Economic Development Corporation.

In 2019, the building took on a new purpose once more. The building was purchased by area non-profit organizations, Metro Inclusive Health and CAN Community Health, in partnership with the Capitano family. The subsequent restoration project, which was selected for a Hillsborough County Historic Preservation Challenge Grant to repair the stucco exterior façade and windows. Renovations also included the addition of an attached health center building.

== Now ==
The German-American Club is home to an area non-profit organization CAN Community Health. This 501(c)3 healthcare organizations provide health resources with a focus on HIV testing and treatment.

== See also ==
- The Mutual Aid Societies of Ybor City
- El Centro Español de Tampa
- Centro Asturiano de Tampa
- Ybor City Historic District
