= La Gaceta (Tampa) =

- Type: Weekly newspaper
- Founder: Victoriano Manteiga
- Founded: 1922
- Language: English, Spanish, Italian
- ISSN: 0016-3724
- Website: lagacetanewspaper.com

La Gaceta is a weekly newspaper in Tampa, Florida, founded in 1922. Published in English, Spanish, and Italian, it is the only trilingual newspaper in the United States.

The paper was founded by Victoriano Manteiga, a former lector in the cigar factories of West Tampa and Ybor City, to serve the needs of the immigrant population of Tampa.

Later, his son Roland Manteiga took over as editor and publisher. Roland was very well connected, and his column "As We Heard It", became the local mid-20th century version of today's political blogs, often breaking stories and predicting events before the area's "major" newspapers.

Today, La Gaceta is still published weekly under the direction of Roland's son, Patrick Manteiga, who has assumed authorship of the "As We Heard It" column. Additional editors are Manuela Ball (Spanish Section) and Giuseppe Maniscalco (Italian Section). Other columnists include Arturo Rivera, Joe O'Neill, Richard Muga, Emily Carney, Paul Guzzo, Leonardo Venta, Harvey Grajales, Gene Siudut, Kyle Dion and Travis Puterbaugh.

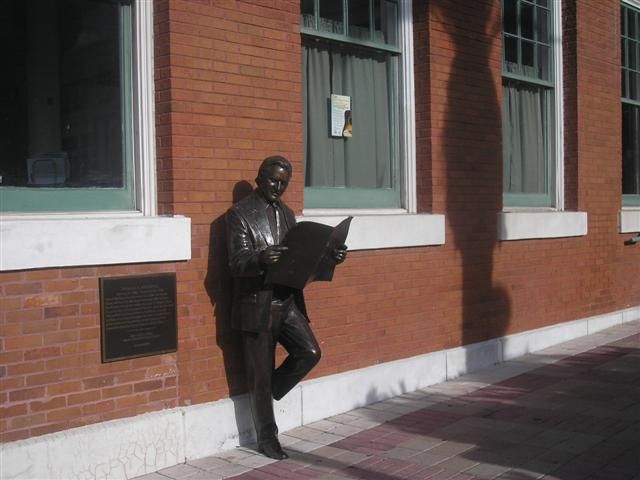
Statue of former editor Roland Manteiga reading La Gaceta, Centro Ybor

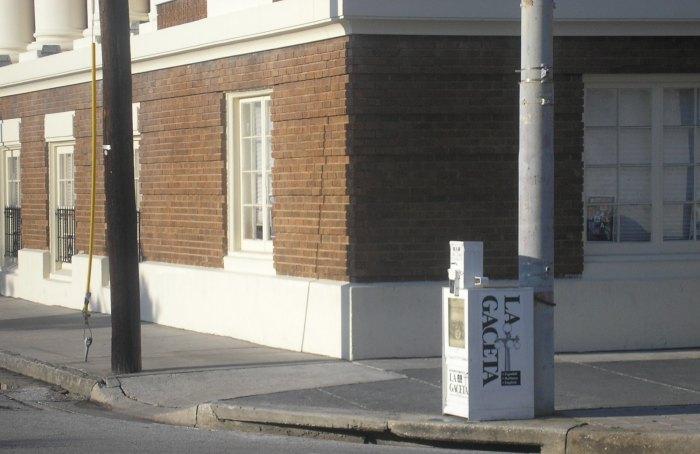
La Gaceta box in front of Italian Club building, Ybor City
