= V.M. Ybor =

Neighborhood in Hillsborough, Florida, United States

- Neighborhood
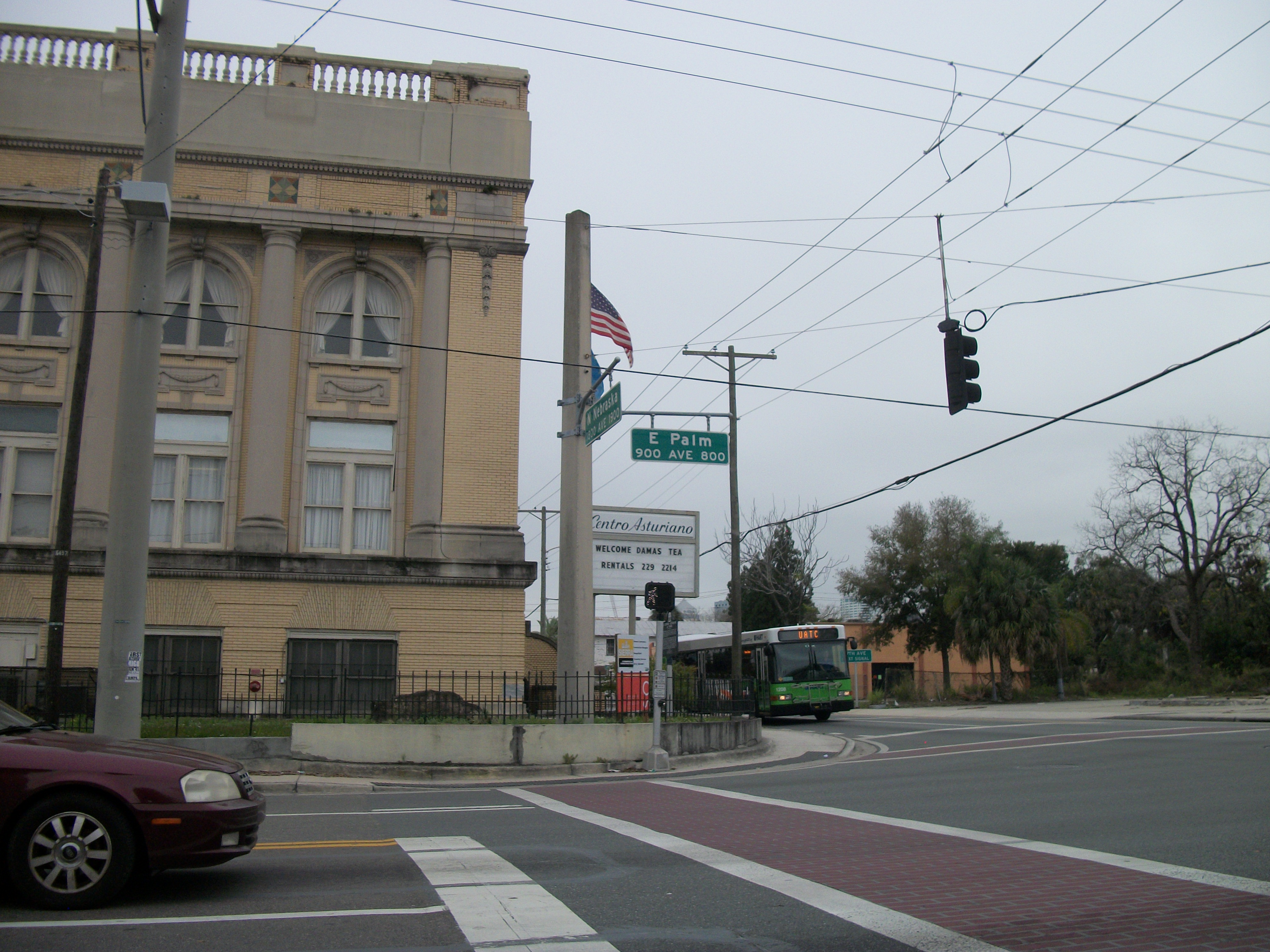
- The historic Centro Asturiano de Tampa as seen from the intersection of North Nebraska and East Palm Avenues in February 2014.

- Location within the state of Florida
- Coordinates: 27°58′15″N 82°26′50″W
- Country: United States
- State: Florida
- County: Hillsborough
- City: Tampa

Population (2000)
  - Total: 3,010
- Time zone: UTC-5 (Eastern (EST))
  - Summer (DST): UTC-4 (EDT)
- ZIP codes: 33602, 33603, and 33605

V.M. Ybor is a neighborhood within the city limits of Tampa, Florida, United States. As of the 2010 census, the neighborhood had a population of 1,743. The ZIP Codes serving the neighborhood are 33602, 33603, and 33605.

The central Tampa area now known as V.M. Ybor, a National Historic Landmark District and now part of the local historic district Barrio Latino, was settled soon after Ybor City was founded in 1885. Ybor City itself was annexed by the city of Tampa in 1887. The "V.M." in the name stands for "Vicente Martinez", as in Vicente Martinez Ybor, the Spanish cigar manufacturer who founded Ybor City in 1885. The area is officially classified as a separate neighborhood from the Ybor City Historic District .

History

For several decades, many Cuban, Spanish, and Italian cigar workers, managers, accountants and other business owners lived in the middle-class neighborhood just a few blocks north of the commercial district of Ybor City that centered on 7th Avenue.

Mid-century, changes in the economics and business ventures of the cigar industry caused many residents to move to other parts of Tampa. Despite this, and the urban renewal that took place in nearby Ybor City during the 1960s, many historic homes and structures in V.M. Ybor maintain their historic framework.

Today, many homes, commercial buildings, and cigar factories built in the early 1900s still stand with some functioning as architectural firms, social media and technology businesses as well as design consulting corporations. The early part of the aughts (00s) brought an influx of new homeowners and residents eager to restore the neighborhood to its glory in central Tampa.

== Geography ==
V.M. Ybor boundaries are Interstate 4 to the south, 26th Avenue to the north, East Tampa (15th St.) to the east, and Interstate 275 to the west.

== Demographics ==
According to the census of 2010, there was a population of 1,743 with 609 households identified in the neighborhood. The population density was 7,236/mi^{2}. The ethnic makeup according to the census of 2010 was 58% non-Hispanic or Latino with 42% identifying as Hispanic or Latino.The racial makeup of the neighborhood was 43% White, 44% African American and 12% identifying as other.

Nearly half (47%) of the residents were between the ages of 18 and 49. One quarter of the community's residents (25%) were children under the age of 18. The majority of households were married couples, with individually led households constituting 29% of the population and non family households of two or more people making up 14% of the population.

== See also ==
- Neighborhoods in Tampa, Florida
