= Index of Florida-related articles =

The following is an alphabetical list of articles related to the U.S. state of Florida.

== 0–9 ==
The location of the state of Florida in the United States of America

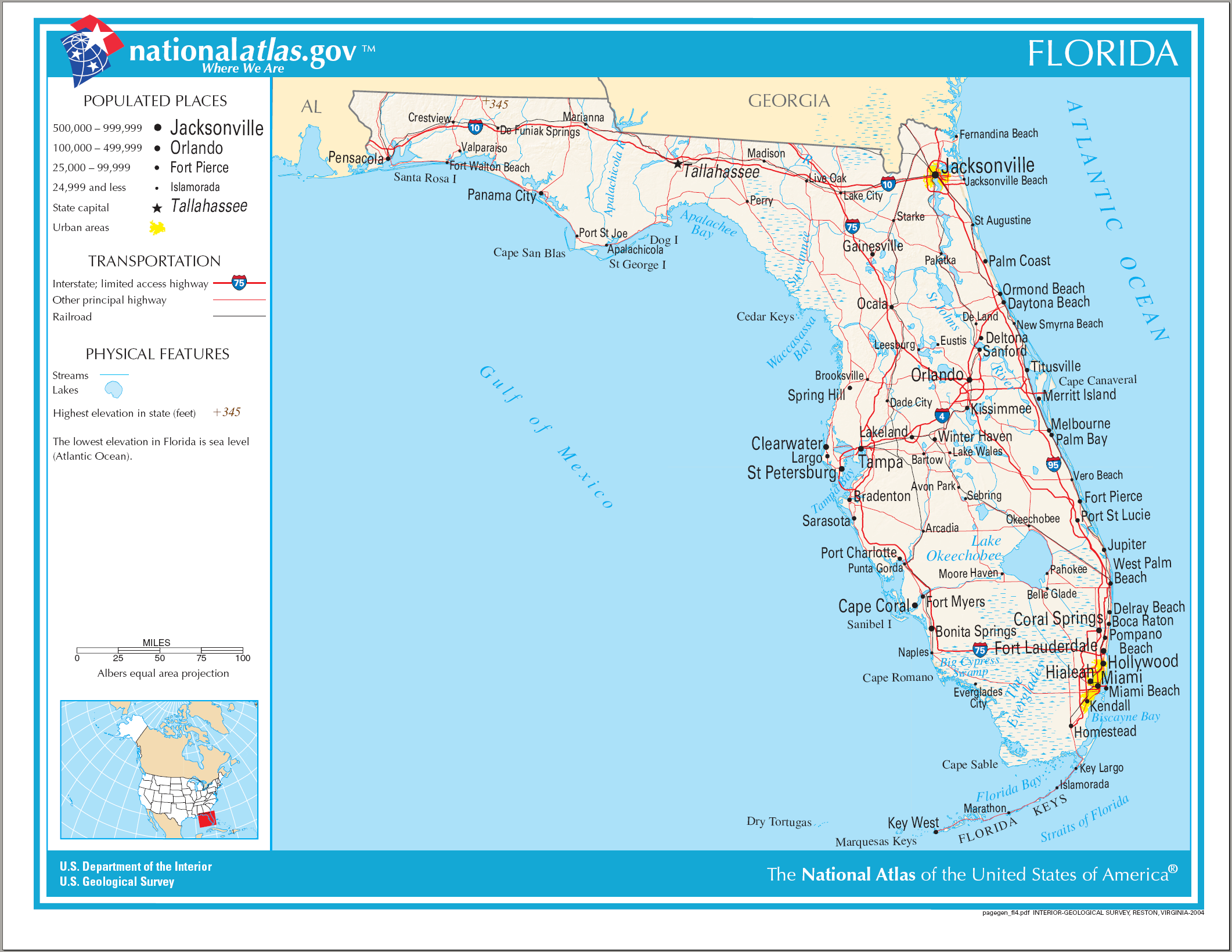
An enlargeable map of the state of Florida

- .fl.us – Internet second-level domain for the state of Florida
- 1st Florida Cavalry Regiment (Confederate)
- 1st Florida Cavalry Regiment (Union)
- 1st Florida Infantry
- 1st Florida Special Cavalry Battalion
- 2nd Florida Cavalry Regiment (Confederate)
- 2nd Florida Cavalry Regiment (Union)
- 2nd Florida Infantry
- 3rd Florida Infantry
- 5th Florida Infantry
- 7th Florida Infantry
- 8th Florida Infantry
- 11th Florida Infantry
- 25th parallel north
- 26th parallel north
- 27th parallel north
- 27th state to join the United States of America
- 28th parallel north
- 29th parallel north
- 30th parallel north
- 31st parallel north, forms part of Florida's border with Alabama.
- 81st meridian west
- 82nd meridian west
- 83rd meridian west
- 84th meridian west
- 85th meridian west
- 86th meridian west
- 87th meridian west

== A ==
- Abortion in Florida
- Acosta Bridge
- Adams-Onís Treaty of 1819
- Adamsville, Hillsborough County, Florida
- Adjacent states:
  - State of Alabama
  - State of Georgia
- African Cemetery at Higgs Beach
- Agriculture in Florida
- Airports in Florida
- Alachua County, Florida
- Alachua County Library District
- Alachua County Sheriff's Office
- Alafia, Florida
- Alafia River State Park
- Alapaha River
- Albert Whitted Airport
- Altha, Florida
- Amelia Island State Park
- Amusement parks in Florida
  - commons:Category:Amusement parks in Florida
- Anastasia State Park
- Anna Maria, Florida
- Anna Maria Island
- Antioch, Florida
- Apalachicola Bay
- Apalachicola, Florida
- Apalachicola Regional Airport
- Apalachicola River
- Apollo Beach, Florida
- Aquaria in Florida
  - commons:Category:Aquaria in Florida
- Arboreta in Florida
  - commons:Category:Arboreta in Florida
- Arcadia, Florida
- Arcadia Municipal Airport
- Archaeology in Florida
  - Category:Archaeological sites in Florida
    - commons:Category:Archaeological sites in Florida
- Architecture in Florida
- Area codes in Florida
- Arlington (Jacksonville)
- Armenia Gardens Estates
- Art museums and galleries in Florida
  - commons:Category:Art museums and galleries in Florida
- Astatula, Florida
- Astor Bridge
- Astronomical observatories in Florida
- Atlantic Beach, Florida
- Attorney General of the State of Florida
- Auburndale, Florida
- Audubon Park (Tampa)
- Aucilla River
- Avalon State Park
- Aventura, Florida
- Avon Park, Florida
- Ax Handle Saturday
- Azalea Park, Florida

== B ==
- Bahama Village
- Bahia Honda State Park
- Bahia Honda Rail Bridge
- Baker County, Florida
- Baker County Sheriff's Office (Florida)
- Baker's Haulover Inlet
- Bald Point State Park
- Bal Harbour, Florida
- Ballast Point (Tampa)
- Balm, Florida
- Banana River
- Barber–Mizell feud
- Barge Port (Palatka, Florida)
- Bartow Executive Airport
- Battle of Ballast Point
- Battle of Fort Brooke
- Battle of Fort Myers
- Battle of Gainesville
- Battle of Lake Okeechobee
- Battle of Marianna
- Battle of Natural Bridge
- Battle of Ocheesee
- Battle of Olustee
- Battle of Ouithlacoochie
- Battle of Pensacola (1861)
- Battle of Pine Island Ridge
- Battle of Saint Johns Bluff
- Battle of San Felasco Hammock
- Battle of Santa Rosa Island
- Battle of St. Johns Bluff
- Battle of Vernon
- Battle of Wahoo Swamp
- Battles of the Loxahatchee
- Bayard (Jacksonville)
- Bay County Courthouse (Florida)
- Bay County, Florida
- Bay Crest Park, Florida
- Bay Harbor Islands, Florida
- Bay Hill, Florida
- Bay Lake, Florida
- Bay of Pigs Monument
- Bay of Pigs Museum
- Bayshore Beautiful
- Bayshore Gardens, Florida
- Bayshore Gardens (Tampa)
- Bayside West
- Beaches of Florida
  - commons:Category:Beaches of Florida
- Beach Park (Tampa)
- Beach Park Isles
- Bealsville, Florida
- Beasley (Tampa)
- Bee Ridge, Florida
- Belleair, Florida
- Belleair Beach, Florida
- Belleair Bluffs, Florida
- Belleair Shore, Florida
- Belle Glade, Florida
- Belle Glade State Municipal Airport
- Belle Isle, Florida
- Belleview, Florida
- Bell, Florida
- Bel Mar Shores
- Belmont Heights (Tampa)
- Bert Dosh Memorial Bridge
- Beverly Beach, Florida
- Bicycle trails in Florida
- Big Bend Power Station
- Big Lagoon State Park
- Big Shoals State Park
- Big Talbot Island State Park
- Bill Baggs Cape Florida State Park
- Biscayne Bay
- Biscayne National Park
- Bithlo, Florida
- Blackburn Point Bridge
- Blackwater River (Florida)
- Blackwater River State Park
- Blind Pass
- Bloomingdale, Florida
- Blountstown, Florida
- Blue Spring State Park
- Boca Grande Causeway
- Boca Raton, Florida
- Boca Raton Airport
- Bok Tower Gardens
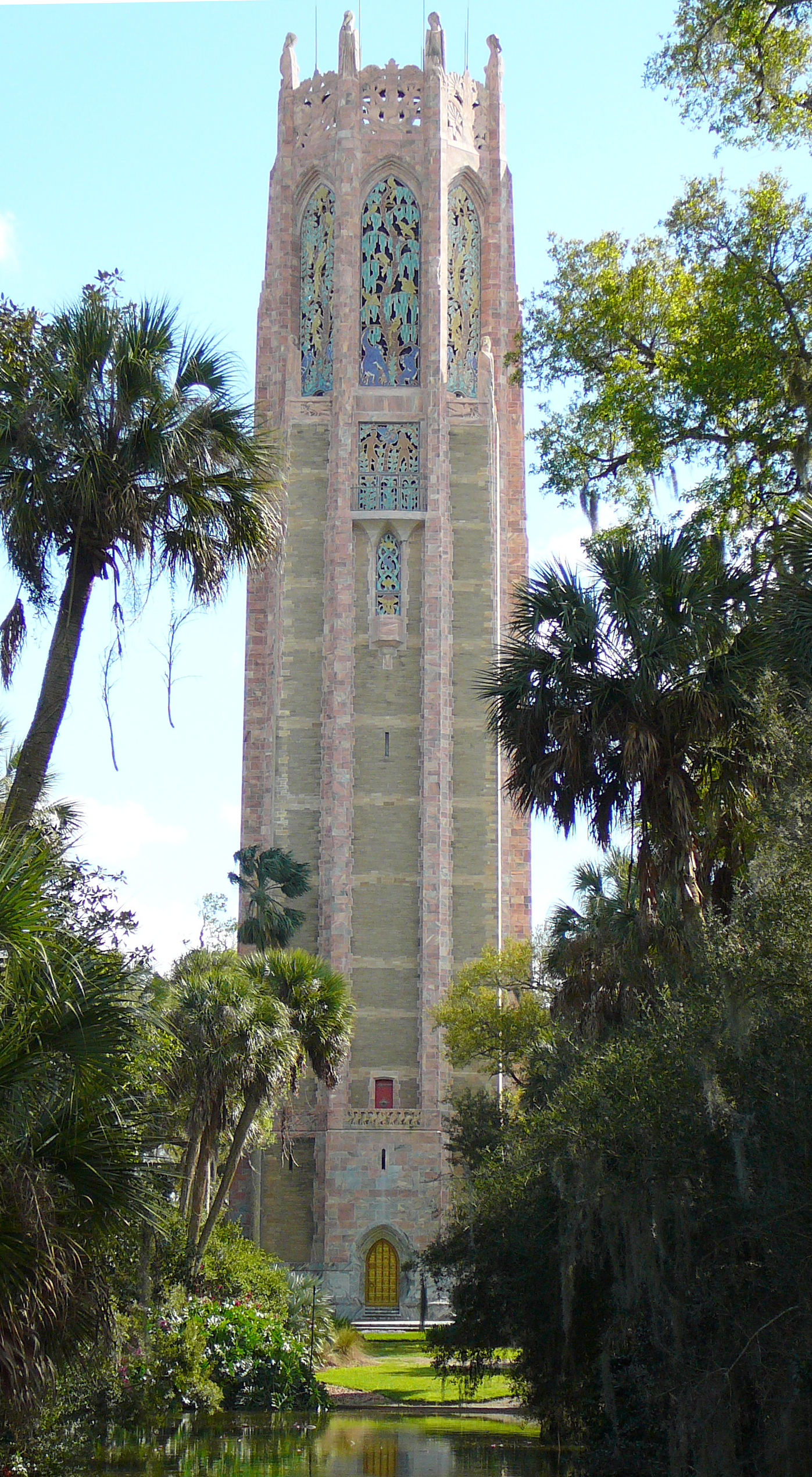
  Bok Tower at Bok Tower Gardens
- Bon Air (Tampa)
- Bonita Beach Causeway
- Bonita Springs, Florida
- Botanical gardens in Florida
  - commons:Category:Botanical gardens in Florida
- Bowling Green, Florida
- Bowman Heights
- Boyette, Florida
- Boyton Beach, Florida
- Braden River
- Bradenton, Florida
- Bradenton Beach, Florida
- Bradford County, Florida
- Brandon, Florida
- Brevard County, Florida
- Brevard County Library System
- Brickell
- Brickell Avenue
- Brickell Avenue Bridge
- Brickell station
- Bridge of Lions
- Brightline
- Bristol, Florida
- Broadway Bridge (Daytona Beach)
- Brooklyn (Jacksonville)
- Brooksville–Tampa Bay Regional Airport
- Broward County, Florida
- Broward County Library
- Broward County Sheriff's Office
- Buckman Bridge
- Buenaventura Lakes, Florida
- Buildings and structures in Florida
  - commons:Category:Buildings and structures in Florida
- Bulow Creek State Park
- Bulow Plantation Ruins Historic State Park
- Bunnell, Florida

== C ==
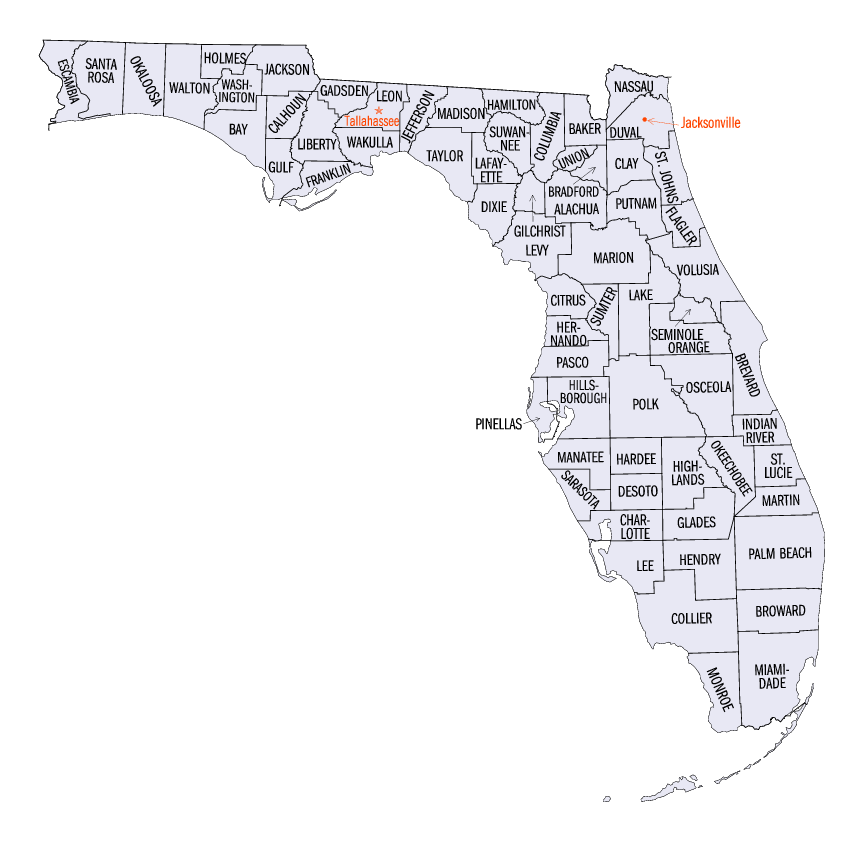
A clickable map of the 67 counties of the state of Florida

- Caladesi Island State Park
- Calhoun County Airport (Florida)
- Calhoun County, Florida
- Caloosahatchee Bridge
- Caloosahatchee River
- Camp Helen State Park
- Canaveral National Seashore
- Cannabis in Florida
- Cape Coral Bridge
- Capital of the State of Florida
- Capitol of the State of Florida
  - commons:Category:Florida State Capitol
- Captiva Pass
- Card Sound Bridge
- la Caroline, 1564–1565
- Carrabelle, Florida
- Carrabelle River
- Carrollwood (CDP), Florida
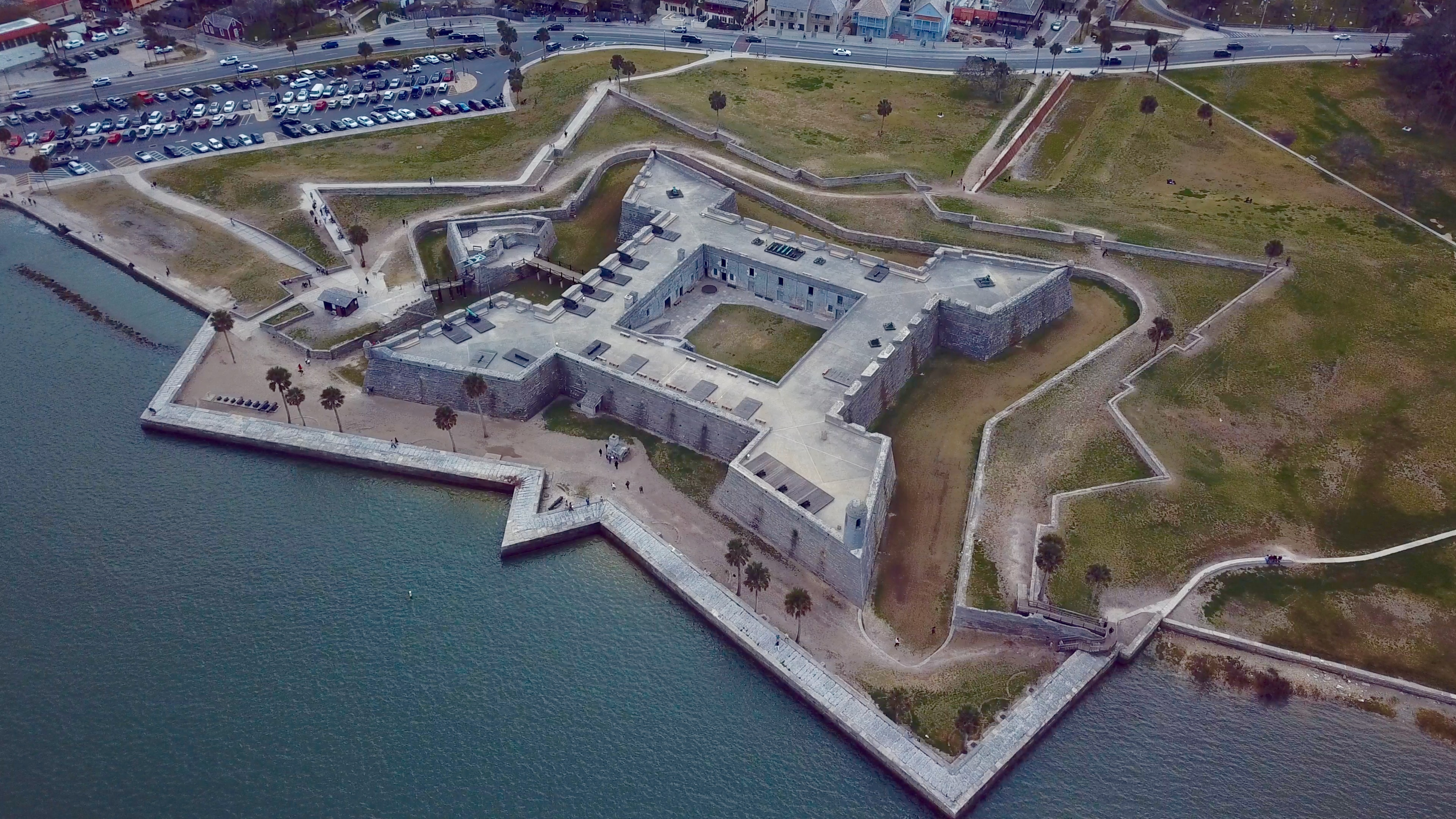
- An aerial photograph of Castillo de San Marcos in St. Augustine
  Castillo de San Marcos
- Caves of Florida
  - commons:Category:Caves of Florida
- Caxambas Pass
- Cayo Costa State Park
- Cecil Airport
- Cedar Key, Florida
- Census statistical areas of Florida
- Channel District
- Charlotte County, Florida
- Chassahowitzka National Wildlife Refuge
- Chassahowitzka River
- Chattahoochee, Florida
- Chattahoochee River
- Cheval, Florida
- Chiefland, Florida
- Chipola River
- Choctaw Sea, ancient Florida
- Chotctawhatchee Bay
- Chotctawhatchee River
- Christmas, Florida
- Citrus County, Florida
- Citrus Park, Florida
- Citrus County Sheriff's Office
- Clarcona, Florida
- Clay County Courthouse (Florida)
- Clay County, Florida
- Clearwater, Florida
- Clearwater Memorial Causeway
- Clermont, Florida
- Clewiston, Florida
- Cities in Florida
  - commons:Category:Cities in Florida
- Climate of Florida
  - Category:Climate of Florida
    - commons:Category:Climate of Florida
- Climate change in Florida
- Colleges and universities in Florida
  - commons:Category:Universities and colleges in Florida
- Collier County, Florida
- Collier County Public Library
- Collier-Seminole State Park
- Collins Avenue
- Colony of East Florida, 1763–1783
- Colony of West Florida, 1763–1783
- Colt Creek State Park
- Columbia County Courthouse (Florida)
- Columbia County, Florida
- Communications in Florida
  - commons:Category:Communications in Florida
- Companies in Florida
  - Category:Companies based in Florida
- Congressional districts of Florida
- Congress of French Culture in Florida
- Constitution of the State of Florida
- Convention centers in Florida
  - commons:Category:Convention centers in Florida
- Convention Center station (Jacksonville)
- Conway, Florida
- Coral Gables, Florida
- Cortez, Florida
- Coral Springs Covered Bridge
- Coral Springs Fire Department
- Coral Springs, Florida
- Cory Lake Isles
- Counties of the state of Florida
  - commons:Category:Counties in Florida
- County roads in Florida
- Courtney Campbell Causeway
- COVID-19 pandemic in Florida
- Crocodile Lake National Wildlife Refuge
- Cross City Airport
- Crystal River Airport
- Crystal River Energy Complex
- Crystal River (Florida)
- Crystal River Preserve State Park
- Culbreath Bayou
- Culbreath Isles
- Culture of Florida
  - commons:Category:Florida culture
    - Floribbean cuisine
- Curry Hammock State Park
- Curtis Hixon Waterfront Park
- Cutler Bay, Florida
- Cypress Lake, Florida

== D ==
- Dade Battlefield Historic State Park
- Dade massacre
- Dames Point Bridge
- Dania Beach, Florida
- Davenport, Florida
- Davie, Florida
- Daytona Beach Bandshell
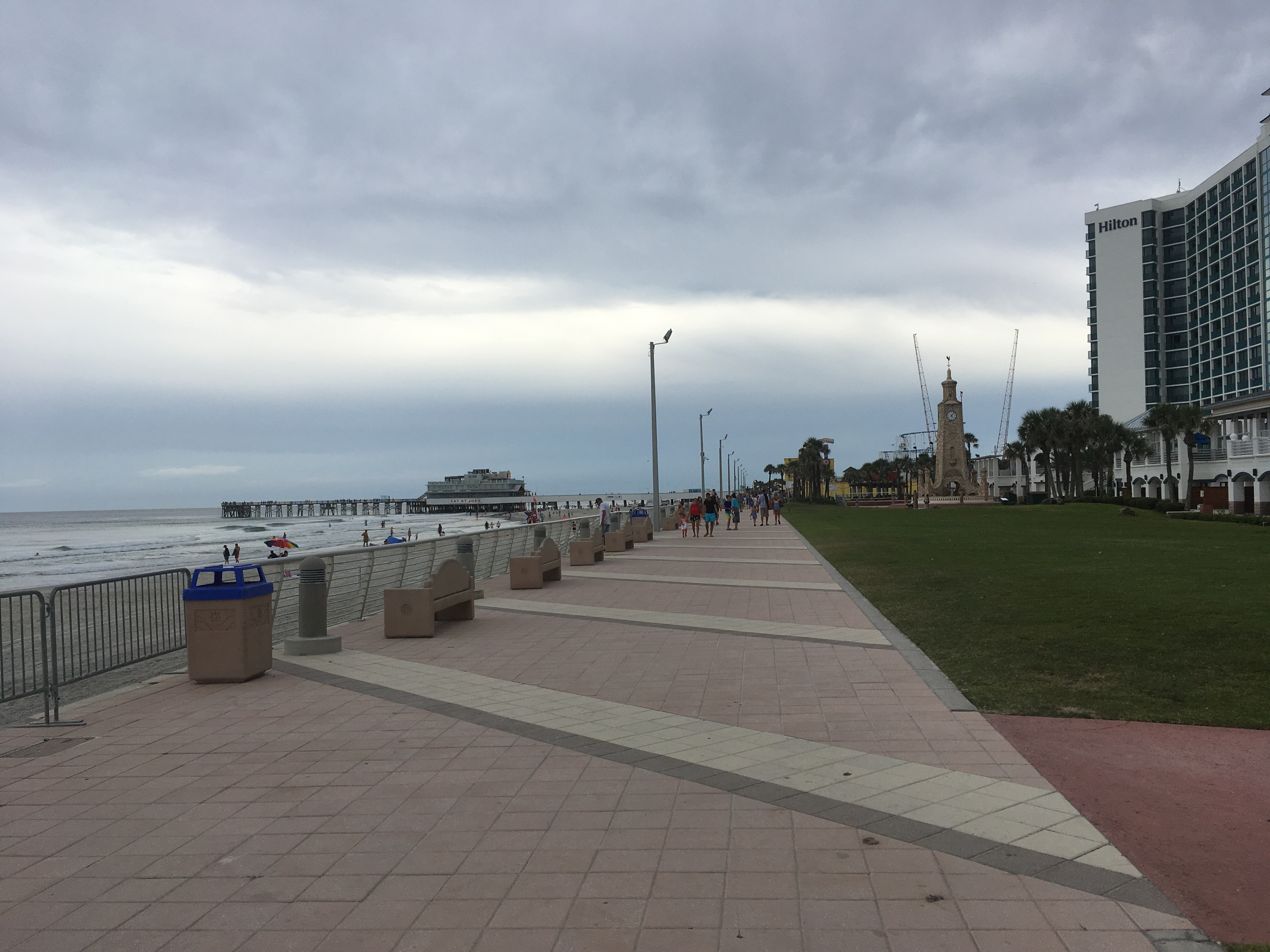
- The Daytona Beach boardwalk
  Daytona Beach Boardwalk
- Daytona Beach, Florida
- Daytona Beach International Airport
- Daytona Beach Police Department
- Debary, Florida
- Deerfield Beach, Florida
- Deer Lake State Park
- DeFuniak Springs Airport
- DeLand, Florida
- DeLand Municipal Airport
- De Leon Springs State Park
- Delnor-Wiggins Pass State Park
- Delray Beach, Florida
- Deltona, Florida
- Demographics of Florida
  - Category:Demographics of Florida
- DeSoto County Courthouse (Florida)
- DeSoto County, Florida
- Desoto Lakes, Florida
- De Soto National Memorial
- DeSoto Next Generation Solar Energy Center
- Destin–Fort Walton Beach Airport
- Devil's Millhopper Geological State Park
- Dixie County, Florida
- Doctor Phillips, Florida
- Don Pedro Island State Park
- Doral, Florida
- Dover, Florida
- Downtown Jacksonville
- Downtown Tampa
- Dr. Von D. Mizell-Eula Johnson State Park
- Dry Tortugas National Park
- Dunedin, Florida
- Dunnellon, Florida
- Dunns Creek State Park
- Duval County Courthouse
- Duval County, Florida

== E ==
- Eagle Lake, Florida
- Eagle Lake (Florida)
- East Bay (Santa Rosa County, Florida)
- East Lake-Orient Park, Florida
- Eatonville, Florida
- Eau Gallie Causeway
- Eau Gallie River
- Ecology Party of Florida
- Econfina River
- Econfina River State Park
- Econlockhatchee River
- Economy of Florida
  - Category:Economy of Florida
    - commons:Category:Economy of Florida
- Eden Gardens State Park
- Edgeville, Florida
- Education in Brevard County, Florida
- Education in Florida
  - Category:Education in Florida
    - commons:Category:Education in Florida
- Education in Jacksonville, Florida
- Edison Bridge (Florida)
- Edward Ball Wakulla Springs State Park
- Egmont Key State Park and National Wildlife Refuge
- Egypt Lake, Florida
- Egypt Lake-Leto, Florida
- Elections in Florida
  - Category:Elections in Florida
    - commons:Category:Elections in Florida
- Ellenton, Florida
- El Portal, Florida
- Emergency Medical Services Alliance
- Environment of Florida
  - Category:Environment of Florida
    - commons:Category:Environment of Florida
- Escambia Bay
- Escambia Bay Bridge
- Escambia County, Florida
- Escambia County Sheriff's Office (Florida)
- Estero Bay (Florida)
- Eustis, Florida
- Everglades City, Florida
- Everglades Forever Act
- Everglades National Park

== F ==
The flag of the state of Florida

- Fairview Shores, Florida
- Falling Waters State Park
- Fanning Springs, Florida
- Fanning Springs State Park
- Faver-Dykes State Park
- Fellesmere, Florida
- Fern Cliff
- Ferndale, Florida
- Fern Park, Florida
- Fernandina Beach Municipal Airport
- Festivals in Florida
  - commons:Category:Festivals in Florida
- Fish Hawk, Florida
- FL – United States Postal Service postal code for the state of Florida
- Flag of the state of Florida
- Flagler Beach, Florida
- Flagler County, Florida
- Flagler County Airport
- Florence Villa
- Florida website
  - Category:Florida
    - commons:Category:Florida
      - commons:Category:Maps of Florida
- Florida Administrative Code
- Florida Administrative Register
- Florida Air National Guard
- Florida Aquarium
- Florida Army National Guard
- Florida bankruptcy law
- Florida Bay
- Florida Blue Key
- Florida Board of Accountancy
- Florida Board of Control
- Florida Board of Education
- Florida Board of Governors
- Florida Board of Regents
- Florida Caverns State Park
- Florida Central Voter File
- Florida Certified Organic Growers
- Florida circuit courts
- Florida Citrus Mutual
- Florida City, Florida
- Florida Civil Rights Hall of Fame
- Florida cracker
- Florida Democratic League
- Florida Democratic Party
- Florida Department of Agriculture and Consumer Services
- Florida Department of Air and Water Pollution Control
- Florida Department of Business and Professional Regulation
- Florida Department of Children and Families
- Florida Department of Citrus
- Florida Department of Corrections
- Florida Department of Education
- Florida Department of Environmental Protection
- Florida Department of Environmental Regulation
- Florida Department of Health
- Florida Department of Highway Safety and Motor Vehicles
- Florida Department of Law Enforcement
- Florida Department of Management Services
- Florida Department of Military Affairs
- Florida Department of Revenue
- Florida Department of Transportation
- Florida Department of Veterans Affairs
- Florida Distance Learning Consortium
- Florida Distance Library Learning Initiative
- Florida District Courts of Appeal
- Florida Division of Alcoholic Beverages and Tobacco
- Florida Division of Emergency Management
- Florida Division of Vocational Rehabilitation
- Florida Fifth District Court of Appeal
- Florida Film Critics Circle
- Florida First District Court of Appeal
- Florida Fish and Wildlife Conservation Commission
- Florida Forensic League
- Florida Fourth District Court of Appeal
- Florida High School Athletic Association
- Florida High Tech Corridor Council
- Florida Highway Patrol
- Florida Holocaust Museum
- Florida House of Representatives
- Florida in the American Civil War, 1861–1865
- The Florida Interurban Railway and Tunnel Company
- Florida Judicial Nominating Commission
- Florida Keys Council of the Arts
- Florida Legislative Investigation Committee
- Florida Library Association
- Florida Man
- Florida Medicaid waiver
- Florida Mental Health Act
- Florida Military School
- Florida Municipal Electric Association
- Florida Museum of Photographic Arts
- Florida Music Education Association
- Florida National Guard
- Florida Naval Militia
- The Florida Network of Youth and Family Services
- Florida Occidental, 1783–1821
- Florida Orchestra
- Florida Oriental, 1783–1821
- Florida Ornithological Society
- Florida Philosophical Association
- Florida Power & Light
- Florida property law
- Florida Public Archaeology Network
- Florida Public Relations Association
- Florida Registry of Interpreters for the Deaf
- Florida Rural Broadband Alliance
- Florida Russian Lifestyle Magazine
- Florida Scholastic Press Association
- Florida Second District Court of Appeal
- Florida Senate
- Florida Sheriffs Association
- Florida Slavery Memorial
- Florida Small Business Development Center Network
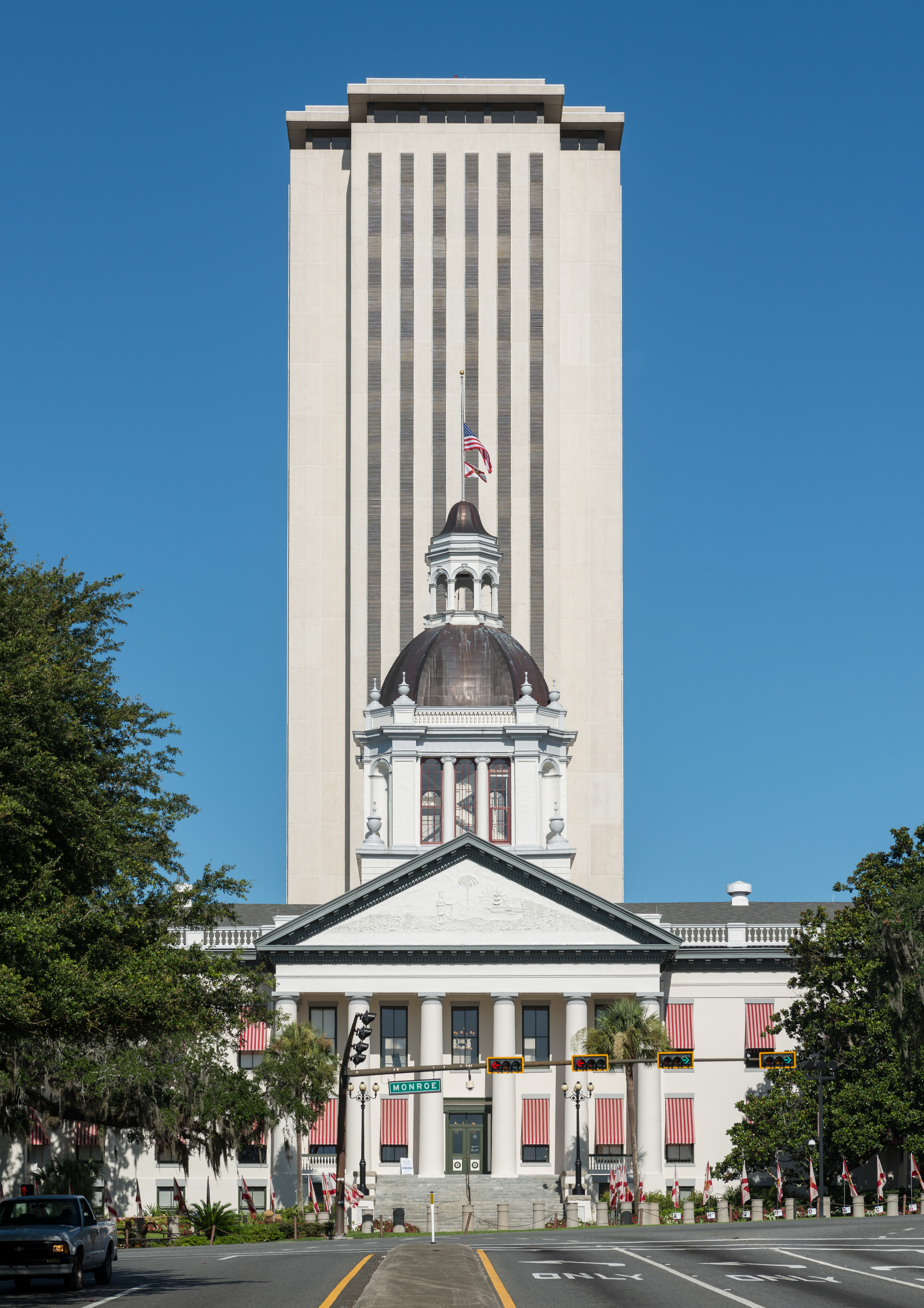
- The old and new Florida State Capitol buildings in Tallahassee. The new State Capitol building is seen in the foreground.
  Florida State Capitol
- Florida State Courts System
- Florida State Guard
- Florida State University
- Florida State University College of Arts and Sciences
- Florida State University College of Business
- Florida State University College of Communication and Information
- Florida State University College of Criminology and Criminal Justice
- Florida State University College of Education
- Florida State University College of Fine Arts
- Florida State University College of Human Sciences
- Florida State University College of Law
- Florida State University College of Medicine
- Florida State University College of Motion Pictures Arts
- Florida State University College of Music
- Florida State University College of Nursing
- Florida State University College of Social Sciences
- Florida State University School of Information
- Florida Student Association
- Florida Surface Water Improvement and Management Act of 1987
- Florida Teacher Certification Examinations
- Florida Third District Court of Appeal
- Florida Virtual School
- Florida Whig Party
- Floridaland
- Forest Hills (Tampa)
- Fort Barrancas
- Fort Clinch State Park
- Fort Cooper State Park
- Fort George Island Cultural State Park
- Fort Lauderdale Fire-Rescue Department
- Fort Lauderdale, Florida
- Fort Lauderdale–Hollywood International Airport
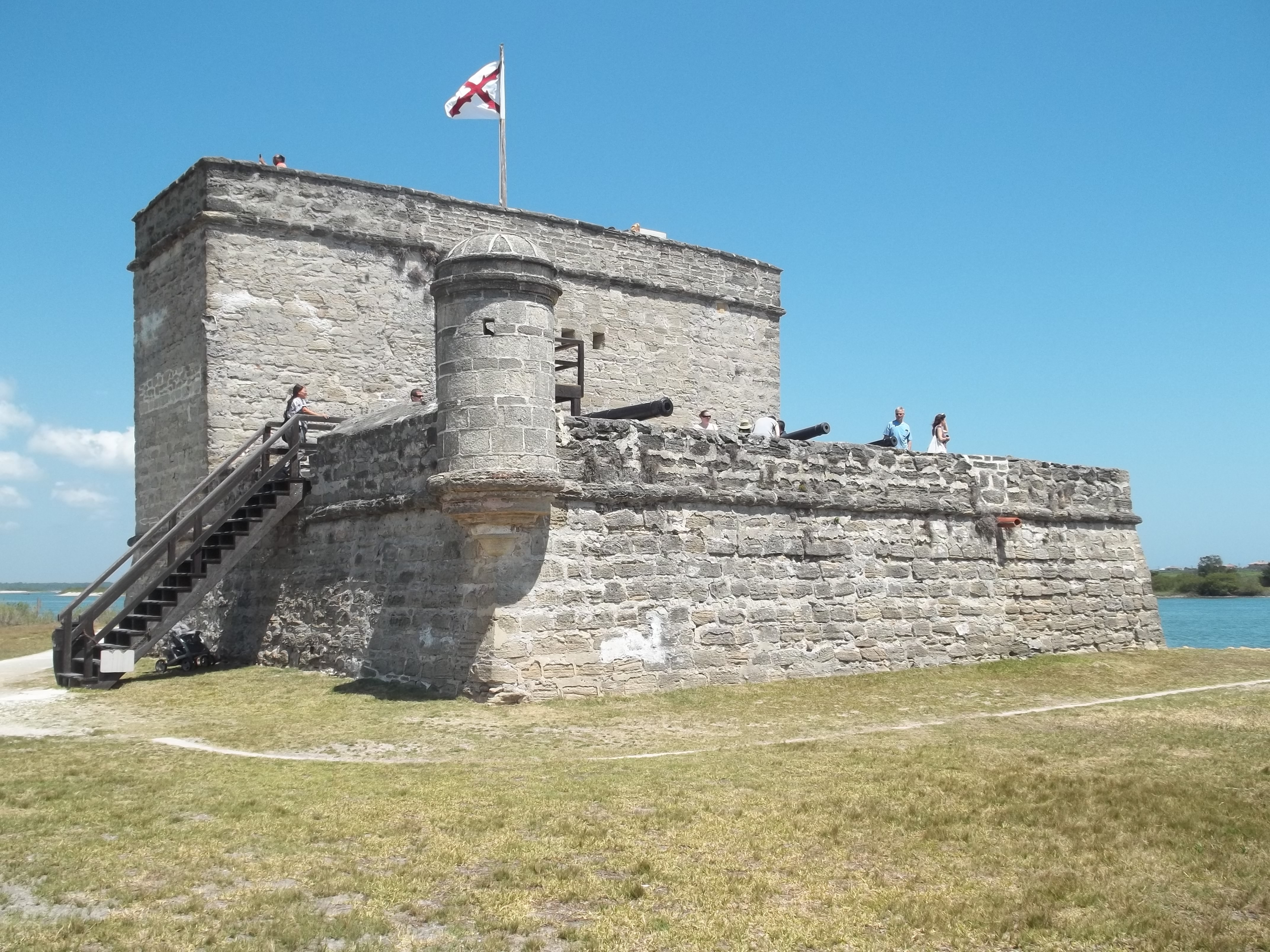
- Fort Matanzas
  Fort Lonesome, Florida
- Fort Matanzas National Monument
- Fort Meade, Florida
- Fort Myers, Florida
- Fort Myers Police Department
- Fort Myers Power Plant
- Fort Pickens
- Fort Pierce Inlet State Park
- Forts in Florida
  - Fort de la Caroline, first French colony 1564–1565
  - Category:Forts in Florida
    - commons:Category:Forts in Florida
- Fort Walton Beach Airport
- Fort White, Florida
- Fort Zachary Taylor Historic State Park
- Four Corners, Florida
- Franklin County, Florida
- Fred Gannon Rocky Bayou State Park
- Frostproof, Florida
- Fruitland Park, Florida
- Fruitville, Florida
- Fuller Warren Bridge

== G ==
The Great Seal of the State of Florida

- Garden City (Jacksonville)
- Gardens in Florida
  - commons:Category:Gardens in Florida
- Gadsden County, Florida
- Gadsden County Public Library System
- Gainesville, Florida
- Gainesville metropolitan area, Florida
- Gainesville Police Department
- Gainesville Regional Airport
- Gandy Bridge
- Gandy-Sun Bay South
- Gasparilla Island State Park
- Gasparilla Pass
- Geneva, Florida
- Geography of Florida
  - Category:Geography of Florida
    - commons:Category:Geography of Florida
- Geology of Florida
  - commons:Category:Geology of Florida
- George Crady Bridge Fishing Pier
- George E. Turner Power Plant
- George Floyd protests in Florida
- Ghost towns in Florida
  - Category:Ghost towns in Florida
    - commons:Category:Ghost towns in Florida
- Gibsonton, Florida
- Gilchrist County Courthouse
- Gilchrist County, Florida
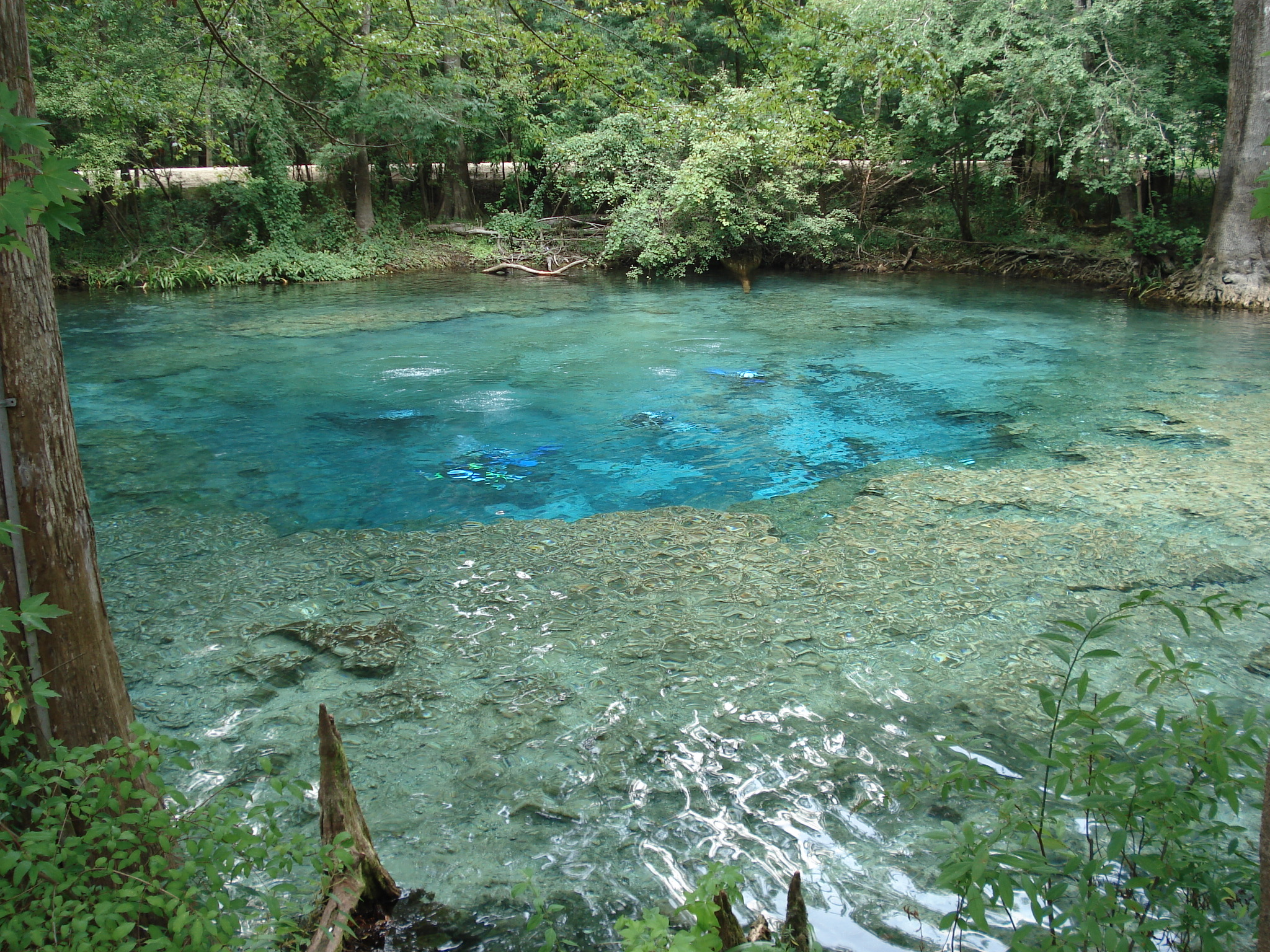
- Ginnie Springs
  Ginnie Springs
- Glades County Courthouse
- Glades County, Florida
- Glazer Children's Museum
- Glen St. Mary, Florida
- Golden Beach, Florida
- Goldenrod, Florida
- Gotha, Florida
- Golf clubs and courses in Florida
- Golf View
- Government of the state of Florida website
  - Category:Government of Florida
    - commons:Category:Government of Florida
- Governor of the State of Florida
  - List of governors of Florida
- Granada Bridge (Ormond Beach)
- Grant Park (Tampa)
- Gray Gables (Tampa)
- Grayton Beach State Park
- Greater Orlando
- Great White Heron National Wildlife Refuge
- Great Seal of the State of Florida
- Green Cove Springs, Florida
- Green Party of Florida
- Greensboro, Florida
- Greenville, Florida
- Gretna, Florida
- Groveland, Florida
- Groveland Four
- Gun laws in Florida
- Gulf City, Florida
- Gulf County, Florida
- Gulfport, Florida

== H ==
- Haines City, Florida
- Halifax River
- Hallandale Beach, Florida
- Hallandale Beach Police Department
- Hamilton County, Florida
- Hampton, Florida
- Hampton Terrace Historic District
- Harbour Island (Tampa)
- Hardee County Courthouse
- Hardee County, Florida
- Harry S. Truman Little White House
- Harvey Heights (Tampa)
- Hathaway Bridge
- Havana, Florida
- Henderson Beach State Park
- Hendry Country, Florida
- Herbert Hoover Dike
- Herlong Recreational Airport
- Hernando County Courthouse
- Hernando County, Florida
- Hernando County Library System
- Homestead, Florida
- Florida's Hazelhurst terrace and shoreline
- Heritage railroads in Florida
  - commons:Category:Heritage railroads in Florida
- Hialeah, Florida
- Hialeah Gardens, Florida
- Hialeah Police Department
- High schools of Florida
- Higher education in Florida
- Highlands County Courthouse
- Highlands County, Florida
- Highlands Hammock State Park
- Highlands Pines
- Highway Patrol of Florida
- Highways in Florida
- Hiking trails in Florida
  - commons:Category:Hiking trails in Florida
- Hillsboro Inlet
- Hillsborough County, Florida
- Hillsborough County Sheriff's Office (Florida)
- Hillsborough River State Park
- Historic Hyde Park North
- Historic Seaport
- History of Bartow, Florida
- History of Florida
  - Historical outline of Florida
    - Category:History of Florida
      - commons:Category:History of Florida
- History of Fort Lauderdale, Florida
- History of Gainesville, Florida
- History of Jacksonville, Florida
- History of Pensacola, Florida
- History of Sarasota, Florida
- History of slavery in Florida
- History of St. Augustine, Florida
- History of Tallahassee, Florida
- History of Tampa, Florida
- History of West Palm Beach, Florida
- History of Ybor City
- Holden Heights, Florida
- Hollywood, Florida
- Hollywood Police Department (Florida)
- Holmes Beach, Florida
- Holmes County, Florida
- Homosassa River
- Homosassa Springs Wildlife State Park
- Homosexuality and Citizenship in Florida
- Honeymoon Island State Park
- Hontoon Dead River
- Hontoon Island State Park
- Hopewell, Hillsborough County, Florida
- Hopewell Gardens, Florida
- Horizon West, Florida
- Hospitals in Florida
- Hot springs of Florida
  - commons:Category:Hot springs of Florida
- House Bill H-837
- Howey-in-the-Hills, Florida
- Hugh Taylor Birch State Park
- Hunter's Creek, Florida
- Hunters Green
- Hyde Park (Tampa)

== I ==
- Ichetucknee River
- Ichetucknee Springs State Park
- Images of Florida
  - commons:Category:Florida
- Immokalee Regional Airport
- Imperial River (Florida)
- Incarceration in Florida
- Independence Party of Florida
- Indian Creek, Florida
- Indian River County, Florida
- Indian River County Library System
- Indian River (Florida)
- Indian River Shores, Florida
- Indian Rocks Beach, Florida
- Indian Shores, Florida
- Indiantown, Florida
- Indigenous people of the Everglades region
- Inglis, Florida
- Interbay (Tampa)
- Interstate highway routes in Florida
- Inverness, Florida
- Iona, Florida
- Islamorada, Florida
- Islands of Florida

== J ==
- Jackson County Courthouse (Florida)
- Jackson County, Florida
- Jackson Heights (Tampa)
- Jacksonville, Florida
- Jacksonville Beach, Florida
- Jacksonville International Airport
- Jacksonville metropolitan area
- Jacksonville Public Library
- Jacksonville Sheriff's Office
- Jacksonville Skyway
- Jacksonville Transportation Authority
- Jacob City, Florida
- Jasper, Florida
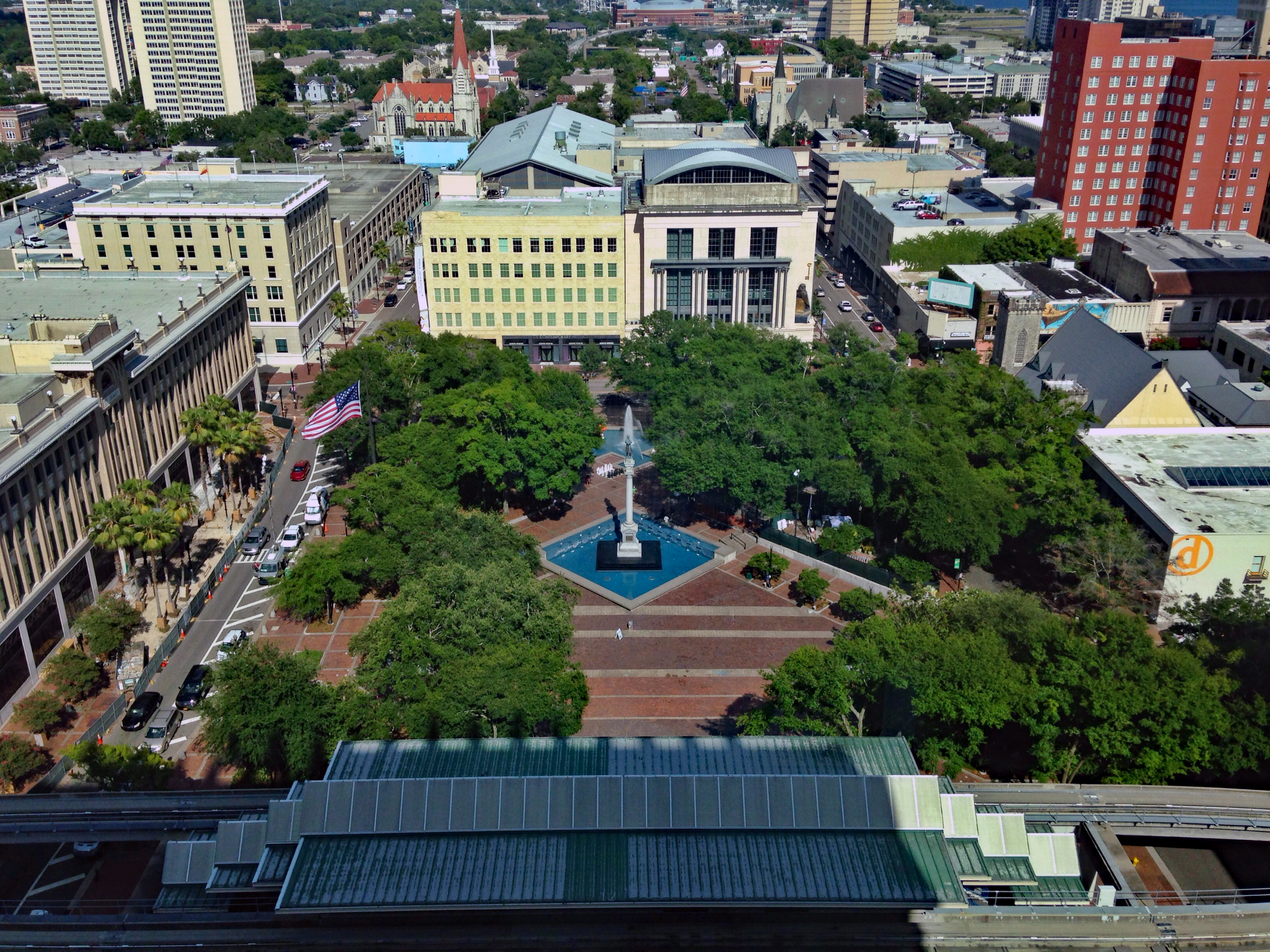
- James Weldon Johnson Park is located within Downtown Jacksonville.
  James Weldon Johnson Park
- James Weldon Johnson Park station
- JEA
- JEA Northside Generating Station
- Jefferson County, Florida
- Jerfferson County Courthouse (Florida)
- Jefferson station (Jacksonville)
- Jewfish Creek Bridge
- Jewish Museum of Florida
- Jim Jumper massacre
- Jim Woodruff Dam
- John D. MacArthur Beach State Park
- John Pennekamp Coral Reef State Park
- John Ringling Causeway
- Jonathan Dickinson State Park
- Jupiter Island, Florida

== K ==
- Kennedy Space Center
- Kenneth City, Florida
- Key Colony Beach, Florida
- Keystone, Florida
- Keystone Heights Airport
- Keystone Heights, Florida
- Keysville, Florida
- Key West
- Key West International Airport
- Key West National Wildlife Refuge
- Key West Police Department
- Kilcrease Light Artillery
- King's Road (Florida)
- Kissimmee, Florida
- Knights, Florida

== L ==
- La Caroline, first French colony 1564–1565
- Lady Lake, Florida
- Lafayette Blue Springs State Park
- Lafayette County Courthouse (Florida)
- Lafayette County, Florida
- La Florida, 1565–1763
- Largo, Florida
- Lakes of Florida
  - commons:Category:Lakes of Florida
- LaBelle, Florida
- LaBelle Municipal Airport
- Lake Alfred, Florida
- Lake Buena Vista, Florida
- Lake Butler, Florida
- Lake City, Florida
- Lake City Gateway Airport
- Lake Clarke Shores, Florida
- Lake County, Florida
- Lake County Sheriff's Office (Florida)
- LaCrosse, Florida
- Lake Fern, Florida
- Lake Griffin State Park
- Lake Hamilton, Florida
- Lake Hart, Florida
- Lake Helen, Florida
- Lake June in Winter Scrub State Park
- Lake Kathryn, Florida
- Lake Kissimmee State Park
- Lakeland, Florida
- Lake Louisa State Park
- Lake Magdalene, Florida
- Lake Manatee State Park
- Lake Mary, Florida
- Lake Placid, Florida
- LaVilla
- Lake Wales Municipal Airport
- Lakewood Ranch, Florida
- Lake Worth Inlet
- Lake Worth Lagoon
- Landmarks in Florida
  - commons:Category:Landmarks in Florida
- Languages of Florida
- Laurel, Florida
- Laws of the state of Florida
- Lawtey, Florida
- Layton, Florida
- League of Women Voters of Florida
- Lee County, Florida
- Lee County Sheriff's Office (Florida)
- Lee, Florida
- Leesburg, Florida
- Leesburg International Airport
- Lehigh Acres, Florida
- Leon County, Florida
- Leto, Florida
- Levy County Courthouse
- Levy County, Florida
- LGBT culture in Miami
- LGBT history in Florida
- LGBT rights in Florida
- Lockhart, Florida
- Longboat Key, Florida
- Lower Suwannee National Wildlife Refuge
- Libertarian Party of Florida
- Lieutenant Governor of the State of Florida
- Lists related to the state of Florida:
  - List of African-American newspapers in Florida
  - List of airports in Florida
  - List of Cape Canaveral and Merritt Island launch sites
  - List of bicycle trails in Florida
  - List of breweries in Florida
  - List of casinos in Florida
  - List of census statistical areas in Florida
  - List of cities in Florida
  - List of colleges and universities in Florida
  - List of companies in Florida
  - List of United States congressional districts in Florida
  - List of counties in Florida
  - List of forts in Florida
  - List of ghost towns in Florida
  - List of governors of Florida
    - List of colonial governors of Florida
  - List of high schools in Florida
  - List of hospitals in Florida
  - List of individuals executed in Florida
  - List of Interstate highway routes in Florida
  - List of islands of Florida
  - List of law enforcement agencies in Florida
  - List of lieutenant governors of Florida
  - List of museums in Florida
  - List of National Historic Landmarks in Florida
  - List of newspapers in Florida
  - List of people from Florida
  - List of places in Florida
  - List of radio stations in Florida
  - List of railroads in Florida
  - National Register of Historic Places listings in Florida
  - List of rivers of Florida
  - List of school districts in Florida
  - List of shipwrecks of Florida
  - List of sister cities in Florida
  - List of state forests in Florida
  - List of state parks in Florida
  - List of state prisons in Florida
  - List of state roads in Florida
  - List of state symbols of Florida
  - List of telephone area codes in Florida
  - List of television stations in Florida
  - List of toll roads in Florida
  - List of Florida's congressional delegations
  - List of United States congressional districts in Florida
  - List of United States representatives from Florida
  - List of United States senators from Florida
  - List of University of Miami alumni
  - List of U.S. highway routes in Florida
- Lithia, Florida
- Little Econlockhatchee River
- Little Manatee River
- Little Manatee River State Park
- Little Talbot Island State Park
- Little Wekiva River
- Live Oaks Square
- Long Key Bridge
- Long Key State Park
- Lovers Key State Park
- Lowry Park Central
- Lowry Park North
- Lutz, Florida

== M ==
- MacArthur Causeway
- Macclenny, Florida
- Macfarlane Park, Tampa
- Madeira Beach, Florida
- Madison Blue Spring State Park
- Madison County Courthouse (Florida)
- Madison County, Florida
- Madison, Florida
- Main Street Bridge (Jacksonville)
- Maitland, Florida
- Manasota Key, Florida
- Manatee County Courthouse
- Manatee County, Florida
- Manatee River
- Manatee Springs State Park
- Mandarin (Jacksonville)
- Mango, Florida
- Maps of Florida
  - commons:Category:Maps of Florida
- Marathon, Florida
- Marchman Act
- Marco Island Airport
- Marco Island, Florida
- Marianna Municipal Airport
- Marina Club
- Marineland, Florida
- Marion County, Florida
- Marion County Public Library System
- Maritime history of Florida
- Martin County, Florida
- Martin Next Generation Solar Energy Center
- Maryland Manor
- Mascotte, Florida
- Matanzas Inlet
- Matanzas Pass Bridge
- Matanzas River
- Mayport (Jacksonville)
- McIntosh, Florida
- Medley, Florida
- Media in Jacksonville, Florida
- Media in Key West, Florida
- Media in Miami
- Media in the Tampa Bay area
- Melbourne Causeway
- Memorial Park (Jacksonville)
- Merrill P. Barber Bridge
- Merritt Island Airport
- Merritt Island Causeway
- Metromover
- Metropolitan Park
- Metrorail (Miami-Dade County)
- Miami Avenue
- Miami Avenue station
- Miami Fire-Rescue Department
- Miami, Florida
- Miami Beach, Florida
- Miami Beach Police Department
- Miami-Dade County Courthouse
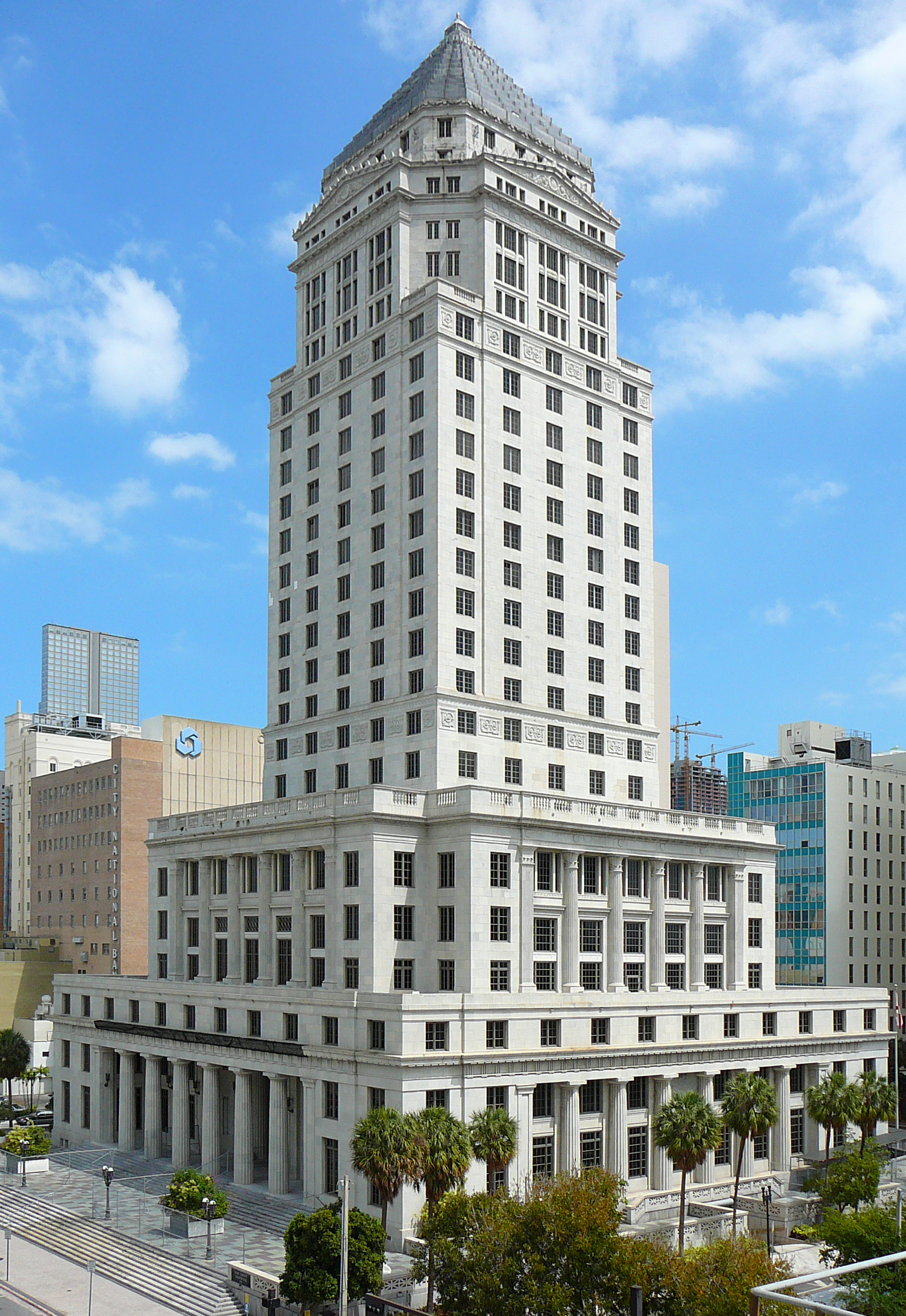
  Miami-Dade County Courthouse
- Miami-Dade County, Florida
- Miami-Dade Fire Rescue Department
- Miami-Dade Police Department
- Miami-Dade Public Library System
- Miami Intermodal Center
- Miami International Airport
- Miami Lakes, Florida
- Miami metropolitan area
- MIA Mover
- Miami Police Department
- Miami River (Florida)
- Miami Shores, Florida
- Mid-Bay Bridge
- Midpoint Memorial Bridge
- Midway, Seminole County, Florida
- Mike Roess Gold Head Branch State Park
- Minneola, Florida
- Miramar, Florida
- Miramar Police Department
- M. K. B. v. Warden
- Monroe County, Florida
- Monroe County Public Library (Florida Keys)
- Montverde, Florida
- Monuments and memorials in Florida
  - commons:Category:Monuments and memorials in Florida
- Moore Haven, Florida
- Mulberry, Florida
- Museums in Florida
  - Category:Museums in Florida
    - commons:Category:Museums in Florida
- Music of Florida
  - Category:Music of Florida
    - commons:Category:Music of Florida
- Myakka River
- Myakka River State Park

== N ==
- Naples, Florida
- Naples Police Department
- Nassau County Courthouse (Florida)
- Nassau County, Florida
- Nassau County Sheriff's Office (Florida)
- National forests of Florida
  - commons:Category:National Forests of Florida
- Natural arches of Florida
  - commons:Category:Natural arches of Florida
- Natural Bridge Battlefield Historic State Park
- Natural history of Florida
  - commons:Category:Natural history of Florida
- Nature centers in Florida
  - commons:Category:Nature centers in Florida
- Negro Fort
- New River Public Library Cooperative
- New Smyrna Beach, Florida
- New Smyrna Beach Municipal Airport
- News media in Florida
- Newspapers of Florida
- Neptune Beach, Florida
- New River Tunnel
- New Suburb Beautiful
- New Town (Jacksonville)
- Nokomis, Florida
- Northdale, Florida
- Northeast Florida Regional Airport
- North Fort Myers, Florida
- North Ruskin, Florida
- Northside (Jacksonville)
- North Tampa
- North Tampa (neighborhood)
- North Miami, Florida
- North Miami Beach, Florida
- North Palm Beach County General Aviation Airport
- North Peninsula State Park
- North Perry Airport
- North Redington Beach, Florida
- North Sarasota, Florida
- Northwest Florida Beaches International Airport
- Nowatney, Florida

== O ==
- Oakland, Florida
- Oakland Park, Florida
- Oaklead Plantation, Florida
- Ocala, Florida
- Ocala International Airport
- Ocala National Forest
- Ocean Breeze, Florida
- Ocean Ridge, Florida
- Oceanway (Jacksonville)
- Ochlockonee River State Park
- Ocklawaha River
- Ocoee massacre
- Ocolee, Florida
- Okeechobean Sea
- Okeechobee Battlefield
- Okeechobee County Airport
- Okeechobee County Courthouse
- Okeechobee County, Florida
- Okeechobee Waterway
- Okefenokee Swamp
- Old Baker County Courthouse
- Old Bradford County Courthouse
- Old Brevard County Courthouse
- Old Calhoun County Courthouse
- Old Charlotte County Courthouse
- Old Citrus County Courthouse
- Old Flagler County Courthouse
- Old Gulf County Courthouse
- Old Hendry County Courthouse
- Old Hillsborough County Courthouse
- Old Indian River County Courthouse
- Old Lake County Courthouse (Florida)
- Old Lee County Courthouse
- Old Manatee County Courthouse
- Old Martin County Courthouse
- Old Orange County Courthouse (Florida)
- Old Pinellas County Courthouse
- Old Polk County Courthouse (Florida)
- Oldsmar, Florida
- Old Wakulla County Courthouse
- Oleta River
- Oleta River State Park
- O'Leno State Park
- Oneco, Florida
- Opa-locka, Florida
- Orange County Courthouse (Florida)
- Orange County Fire Rescue
- Orange County, Florida
- Orange County Library System
- Orange County Sheriff's Office (Florida)
- Orange Island
- Orange River (Florida)
- Orange Park, Florida
- Orchid, Florida
- Orient Park, Florida
- Orlando Fire Department
- Orlando, Florida
- Orlando City Soccer Club
  - Orlando City Stadium
- Orlando International Airport
- Melbourne Orlando International Airport
- Orlando Museum of Art
- Orlando Police Department
- Orlando Sanford International Airport
- Orlando Science Center
- Ortega (Jacksonville)
- Oscar Scherer State Park
- Osceola County Courthouse (Florida)
- Osceola County, Florida
- Osceola Library System
- Osceola National Forest
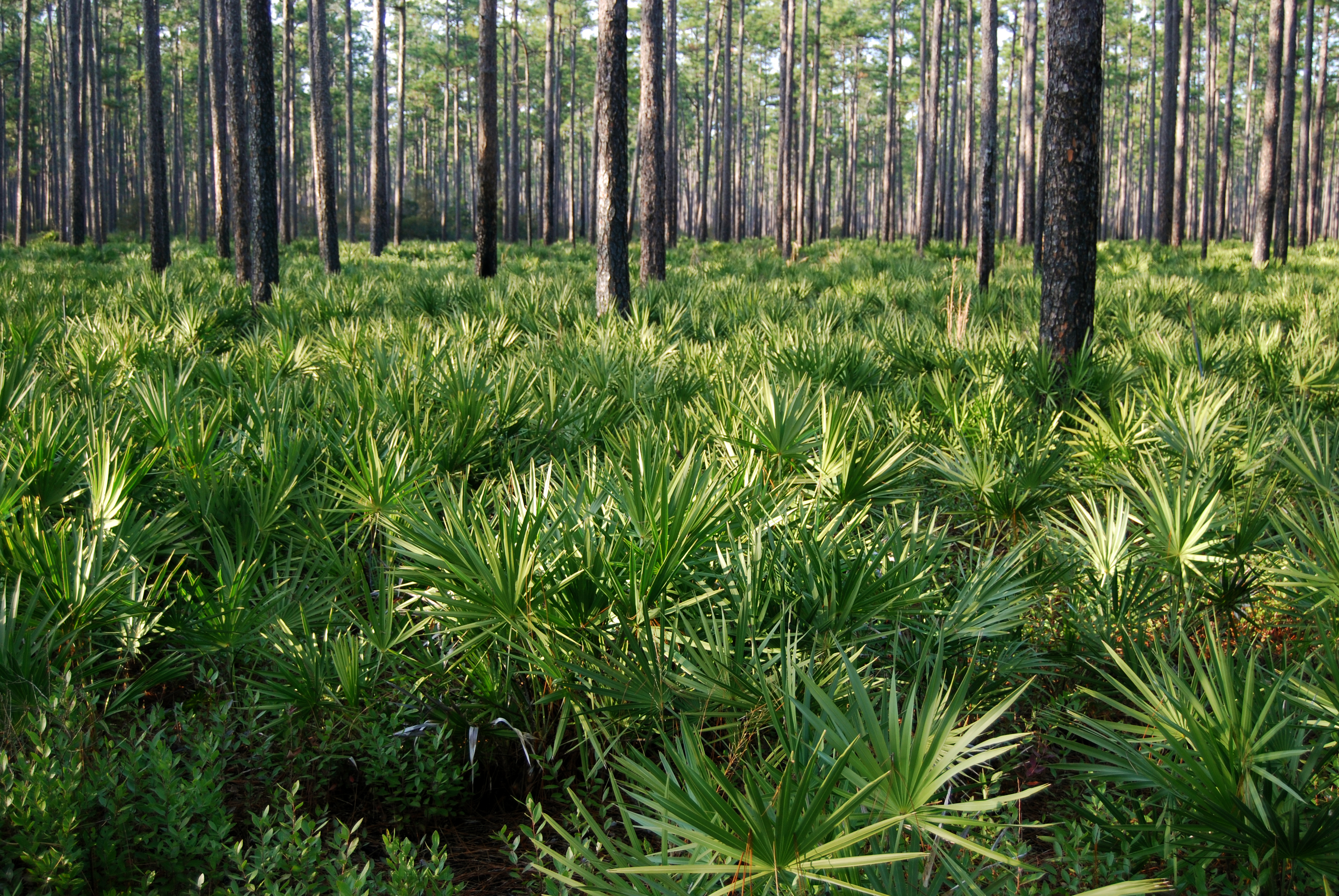
  Osceola National Forest
- Osceola County Sheriff's Office
- Osprey, Florida
- Osteen Bridge
- Otter Creek, Florida
- Outdoor sculptures in Florida
  - commons:Category:Outdoor sculptures in Florida

== P ==
- Page Field
- Paisley, Florida
- Palatka Municipal Airport
- Palm Bay (Florida)
- Palm Beach County, Florida
- Palm Beach County Library System
- Palm Beach, Florida
- Palm Beach Gardens, Florida
- Palm Beach Police Department
- Palm Beach County Fire Rescue
- Palm Beach County Sheriff's Office
- Palm Coast, Florida
- Palma Sola, Florida
- Palmetto Beach
- Palmetto, Florida
- Palm River, Florida
- Palm Springs, Florida
- Panama City–Bay County International Airport, a former airport in Panama City.
- Panama City Beach, Florida
- Panama City, Florida
- Parker, Florida
- Parkland Estates
- Pasco County Courthouse
- Pasco County, Florida
- Pasco County Sheriff's Office
- Pasco–Hernando State College
- Pebble Creek, Florida
- Pembroke Pines, Florida
- Penney Farms, Florida
- Pensacola/Santa María de Ochuse, capital of British Colony of West Florida 1763–1783, capital of the Spanish colony of Florida Occidental 1783–1821
- Pensacola Bay
- Pensacola International Airport
- Pensacola Metropolitan Area
- Pensacola Police Department
- Pensacola State College
- Pensacola streetcar strike of 1908
- People from Florida
  - Category:People from Florida
    - commons:Category:People from Florida
    - Category:People from Florida by populated place
    - Category:People from Florida by county
    - Category:People from Florida by occupation
- Perdido Bay
- Perdido Key State Park
- Perry–Foley Airport
- Perry massacre
- Pinellas County, Florida
- Pinellas County Sheriff's Office
- Pinellas Park, Florida
- Places in Florida
- Plantation, Florida
- Plant City Airport
- Politics of Florida
  - Category:Politics of Florida
    - commons:Category:Politics of Florida
- Polk City, Florida
- Polk County, Florida
- Polk State College
- Ponce de Leon Bay
- Ponce de Leon Inlet
- Ponce de Leon Springs State Park
- Populated places in Florida
  - Cities in Florida
  - Towns in Florida
  - Villages in Florida
  - Census Designated Places in Florida
  - Other unincorporated communities in Florida
  - List of ghost towns in Florida
  - List of places in Florida
- Port Mayaca Lock and Dam
- Port Miami Tunnel
- Port Orange Causeway
- Port Orange, Florida
- Port St. Joe, Florida
- Port Sutton, Florida
- Port Tampa (neighborhood)
- President Donald J. Trump International Airport
- Progress Village, Florida
- Protected areas of Florida
  - commons:Category:Protected areas of Florida
- Punta Gorda Airport (Florida)
- Pulse Memorial and Museum
- Putnam County Courthouse (Florida)
- Putnam County, Florida

== Q ==
- Quincy, Florida

== R ==
- Radio stations in Florida
- Railroad museums in Florida
  - commons:Category:Railroad museums in Florida
- Railroads in Florida
- Rainbow River
- Rainbow Springs State Park
- Rattlesnake (Tampa)
- Reddick, Florida
- Redfish Pass
- Redington Beach, Florida
- Redington Shores, Florida
- Registered historic places in Florida
  - commons:Category:Registered Historic Places in Florida
- Religion in Florida
  - Category:Religion in Florida
- Rembrandt Gardens
- Republican Party of Florida
- Ribault River
- Ridgewood Park (Tampa)
- Ritz Theatre (Jacksonville)
- Riverbend (Tampa)
- Rivercrest
- River Grove (Tampa)
- Rivers of Florida
  - commons:Category:Rivers of Florida
- Riverside and Avondale
- Riverside Heights
- Riverside Park (Jacksonville)
- Riverview, Florida
- Roads in Florida
- Robles Park
- Rockledge, Florida
- Rocky Creek, Florida
- Roller coasters in Florida
  - commons:Category:Roller coasters in Florida
- Roman Catholic Archdiocese of Miami
- Roman Catholic Diocese of Orlando
- Roman Catholic Diocese of Palm Beach
- Roman Catholic Diocese of Pensacola–Tallahassee
- Roman Catholic Diocese of Saint Petersburg
- Roman Catholic Diocese of St. Augustine
- Roman Catholic Diocese of Venice in Florida
- Roosevelt Bridge (Florida)
- Rosewood massacre
- Rotonda West, Florida
- Ruskin, Florida

== S ==
- Safety Harbor, Florida
- Saint Augustine Blues
- Same-sex marriage in Florida
- Samoset, Florida
- San Agustín/Saint Augustine, capital of Spanish Florida 1565–1763, capital of British Colony of East Florida 1763–1783, capital of Spanish Florida Oriental 1783–1821
- Sanford, Florida
- Sanford Police Department (Florida)
- Sanibel Causeway
- San Marco (Jacksonville)
- Santa Fe College
- Santa Fe River (Florida)
- Santa Fe Swamp
- San Marcos de Apalache Historic State Park
- Santa María de Ochuse/Pensacola, capital of British Colony of West Florida 1763–1783, capital of the Spanish colony of Florida Occidental 1783–1821
- Santa Rosa County, Florida
- Santa Rosa County Sheriff's Office
- Sarasota Bay
- Sarasota–Bradenton International Airport
- Sarasota County Courthouse
- Sarasota County, Florida
- Sarasota County Sheriff's Office
- Sarasota, Florida
- Sarasota Police Department
- School districts of Florida
- Scouting in Florida
- Sebastian, Florida
- Sebastian Inlet
- Sebastian Inlet Bridge
- Sebastian Inlet State Park
- Sebastian Municipal Airport
- Sebring, Florida
- Sebring Regional Airport
- Seffner, Florida
- Seminole, Florida
- Seminole County Fire Department
- Seminole County, Florida
- Seminole County Public Library System
- Seminole County Sheriff's Office (Florida)
- Seminole Heights
- Seminole State College of Florida
- Seminole Wars
  - commons:Category:Sports in Florida
- Seven Mile Bridge
- Sewall's Point, Florida
- Shands Bridge
- Shark River (Florida)
- Silver Springs State Park
- Sister cities in Florida
- Skirmish at Cedar Creek
- Skirmish of the Brick Church
- Skyway Fishing Pier State Park
- Socialist Party of Florida
- Soho (Tampa)
- Sopchoppy River
- South Beach
- South Bradenton, Florida
- Southernmost House
- South Florida Regional Transportation Authority
- South Florida State College
- Southgate, Florida
- South Gate Ridge, Florida
- South Lakeland Airport
- South Lake Worth Inlet
- South Nebraska
- South Pasadena, Florida
- Southern Pines (Tampa)
- South Sarasota, Florida
- South Seminole Heights
- Southeast Seminole Heights
- South Tampa
- South Venice, Florida
- Southwest Florida International Airport
- South Westshore
- Sports in Florida
  - Category:Sports in Florida
    - commons:Category:Sports in Florida
  - Category:Sports venues in Florida
    - commons:Category:Sports venues in Florida
- Springfield, Florida
- Springfield (Jacksonville)
- S.S. Jolley Bridge
- Starke, Florida
- State Capitol of Florida
- State of Florida website
  - Constitution of the State of Florida
  - Government of the state of Florida
    - Category:Government of Florida
      - commons:Category:Government of Florida
  - Executive branch of the government of the State of Florida
    - Governor of the State of Florida
  - Legislative branch of the government of the State of Florida
    - Legislature of the State of Florida
      - Senate of the State of Florida
      - House of Representatives of the State of Florida
  - Judicial branch of the government of the State of Florida
    - Supreme Court of the State of Florida
- State College of Florida, Manatee–Sarasota
- State parks of Florida
  - commons:Category:State parks of Florida
- State prisons of Florida
- State roads in Florida
- St. Andrews Bay (Florida)
- St. Andrews State Park
- St. Augustine, Florida
- St. Augustine Foot Soldiers Monument
- St. Cloud, Florida
- Steinhatchee River
- Stephen Foster Folk Culture Center State Park
- St. George Island State Park
- St. Johns County, Florida
- St Johns County Public Library System
- St. Johns River State College
- St. Joseph Bay
- St. Lucie County, Florida
- St. Lucie County Library System
- St. Lucie Inlet
- St. Lucie Nuclear Power Plant
- Stoney Point (Tampa)
- St. Pete Beach, Florida
- St. Pete–Clearwater International Airport
- St. Petersburg College
- St. Petersburg Fire Rescue
- St. Petersburg, Florida
- St. Petersburg, Florida riots of 1996
- St. Petersburg Police Department
- St. Petersburg sanitation strike of 1968
- Structures in Florida
- Stuart, Florida
- Stump Pass Beach State Park
- Sulphur Springs (Tampa)
- Sumter County Courthouse (Florida)
- Sumter County, Florida
- Sumter County Library System
- Sumter County Sheriff's Office (Florida)
- Sun City Center, Florida
- Sunset Park (Tampa)
- Supreme Court of the State of Florida
- Suwannee County Airport
- Suwannee County Courthouse
- Suwannee County, Florida
- Suwannee River
- Suwannee River State Park
- Swann Estates
- Sweetwater Creek, Florida
- Sydney, Florida
- Symbols of the state of Florida
  - Category:Symbols of Florida
    - commons:Category:Symbols of Florida

== T ==
- Tallahassee Community College
- Tallahassee Fire Department
- Tallahassee, Florida, territorial and state capital since 1824
- Tallahassee metropolitan area
- Tallahassee International Airport
- Tallahassee Police Department
- Tallevast, Florida
- Tallulah-North Shore
- Tampa Bay
- Tampa Bay Area
- Tampa Bay Automobile Museum
- Tampa Bay History Center
- Tampa Bypass Canal
- Tampa cigar makers' strike of 1931
- Tampa Fire Rescue Department
- Tampa, Florida
- Tampa Heights
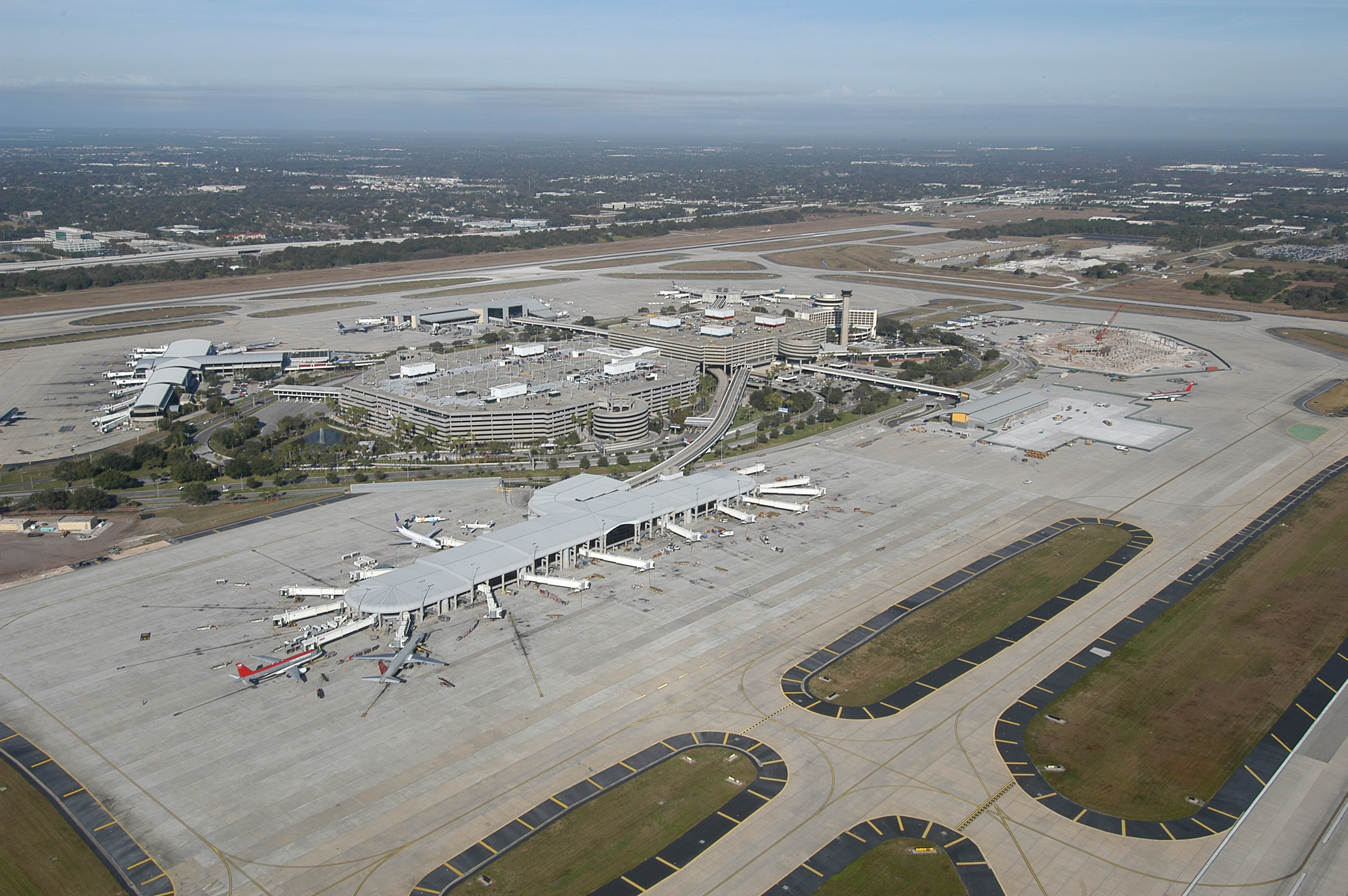
- Aerial photograph of the Tampa International Airport
  Tampa–Hillsborough County Public Library System
- Tampa International Airport
- Tampa Museum of Art
- Tampa Overlook
- Tampa Palms
- Tampa Police Department
- Tampa Union Station
- Tarpon Springs, Florida
- Tavares, Florida
- Taylor County, Florida
- TECO Energy
- TECO Line Streetcar
- Telecommunications in Florida
  - commons:Category:Communications in Florida
- Telephone area codes in Florida
- Television shows set in Florida
- Television stations in Florida
- Temple Crest
- Temple Terrace, Florida
- Terra Ceia, Florida
- Terrace Park (Tampa)
- Territory of Florida, 1822–1845
- Theatres in Florida
  - commons:Category:Theatres in Florida
- Thonotosassa, Florida
- Three Rivers State Park
- T.H. Stone Memorial St. Joseph Peninsula State Park
- Timeline of Fort Lauderdale, Florida
- Timeline of Hialeah, Florida
- Timeline of Jacksonville, Florida
- Timeline of Largo, Florida history
- Timeline of Miami
- Timeline of Orlando, Florida
- Timeline of St. Petersburg, Florida
- Timeline of Tampa, Florida
- Timeline of Tallahassee, Florida
- Titusville, Florida
- Titusville Police Department
- Toll roads in Florida
- Tomoka River
- Tomoka State Park
- Torreya State Park
- Tourism in Florida website
  - commons:Category:Tourism in Florida
- Town 'n' Country, Florida
- Trail of Tears, 1830–1838
- Transportation in Florida
  - Category:Transportation in Florida
    - commons:Category:Transport in Florida
- Transportation in South Florida
- Treasure Coast International Airport
- Treasure Island, Florida
- Trenton, Florida
- Tri-Rail
- Trout River (Florida)
- Troy Spring State Park
- Truman Annex
- Turkey Creek, Florida
- Turkey Point Nuclear Generating Station

== U ==
- Uceta Yard
- Umatilla, Florida
- Union County, Florida
- United States Customs House and Post Office (Pensacola, Florida)
- United States of America
  - States of the United States of America
  - United States census statistical areas of Florida
  - Florida's congressional delegations
  - United States congressional districts in Florida
  - United States Court of Appeals for the Eleventh Circuit
  - United States District Court for the Middle District of Florida
  - United States District Court for the Northern District of Florida
  - United States District Court for the Southern District of Florida
  - United States representatives from Florida
  - United States senators from Florida
- Universal Orlando Resort
- Universities and colleges in Florida
  - commons:Category:Universities and colleges in Florida
- University, Hillsborough County, Florida
- University of Central Florida
- University of Central Florida College of Business Administration
- University of Central Florida College of Dental Medicine
- University of Central Florida College of Engineering and Computer Science
- University of Central Florida College of Medicine
- University of Central Florida College of Nursing
- University of Central Florida College of Optics and Photonics
- University of Central Florida College of Sciences
- University of Florida
- University of Florida College of Agricultural and Life Sciences
- University of Florida College of Dentistry
- University of Florida College of Engineering
- University of Florida College of Liberal Arts and Sciences
- University of Florida College of Medicine
- University of Florida College of Nursing
- University of Miami
- University of North Florida
- University of South Florida
- University of Tampa
- Uptown Tampa
- US-FL – ISO 3166-2:US region code for the State of Florida

== V ==
- Valencia College
- Valparaiso, Florida
- Valrico, Florida
- Vamo, Florida
- Vehicle registration plates of Florida
- Venetian Causeway
- Venice, Florida
- Venice Gardens, Florida
- Venice Municipal Airport
- Vernon, Florida
- Vero Beach, Florida
- Vero Beach Regional Airport
- Victory Bridge (Florida)
- Village of the Arts, Bradenton, Florida
- Virginia Park (Tampa)
- Volusia County, Florida
- Volusia County Public Library
- V.M. Ybor

== W ==
- Wabasso Bridge
- Wakulla County, Florida
- Walt Disney World
- Walton County Courthouse (Florida)
- Walton County, Florida
- Washington County Courthouse (Florida)
- Washington County, Florida
- Water parks in Florida
  - commons:Category:Water parks in Florida
- Wauchula Municipal Airport
- Wedgefield, Florida
- Weeki Wachee Springs
- Wekiwa Springs State Park
- Wellswood
- Werner-Boyce Salt Springs State Park
- Wes Skiles Peacock Springs State Park
- West Bradenton, Florida
- Westchase, Florida
- West County Energy Center
- West Hyde Park
- West Meadows
- West Palm Beach, Florida
- West Palm Beach Police Department
- West Park, Florida
- West Riverfront
- West Samoset, Florida
- Westshore Palms
- Westshore (Tampa)
- West Tampa
- Weston, Florida
- Wewahitchka, Florida
- Whitewater Bay
- Whitfield, Manatee County, Florida
- Williamsburg, Florida
- Williston, Florida
- Williston Municipal Airport
- Wilton Manors, Florida
- Wimauma, Florida
- Windermere, Florida
- Windley Key Fossil Reef Geological State Park
  Wikimedia
  - Wikimedia Commons:Category:Florida
    - commons:Category:Maps of Florida
  - Wikinews:Category:Florida
    - Wikinews:Portal:Florida
  - Wikipedia Category:Florida
    - Wikipedia Portal:Florida
    - Wikipedia:WikiProject Florida
      - Category:WikiProject Florida articles
      - Category:WikiProject Florida participants

== Y ==
- Yankeetown, Florida
- Ybor City
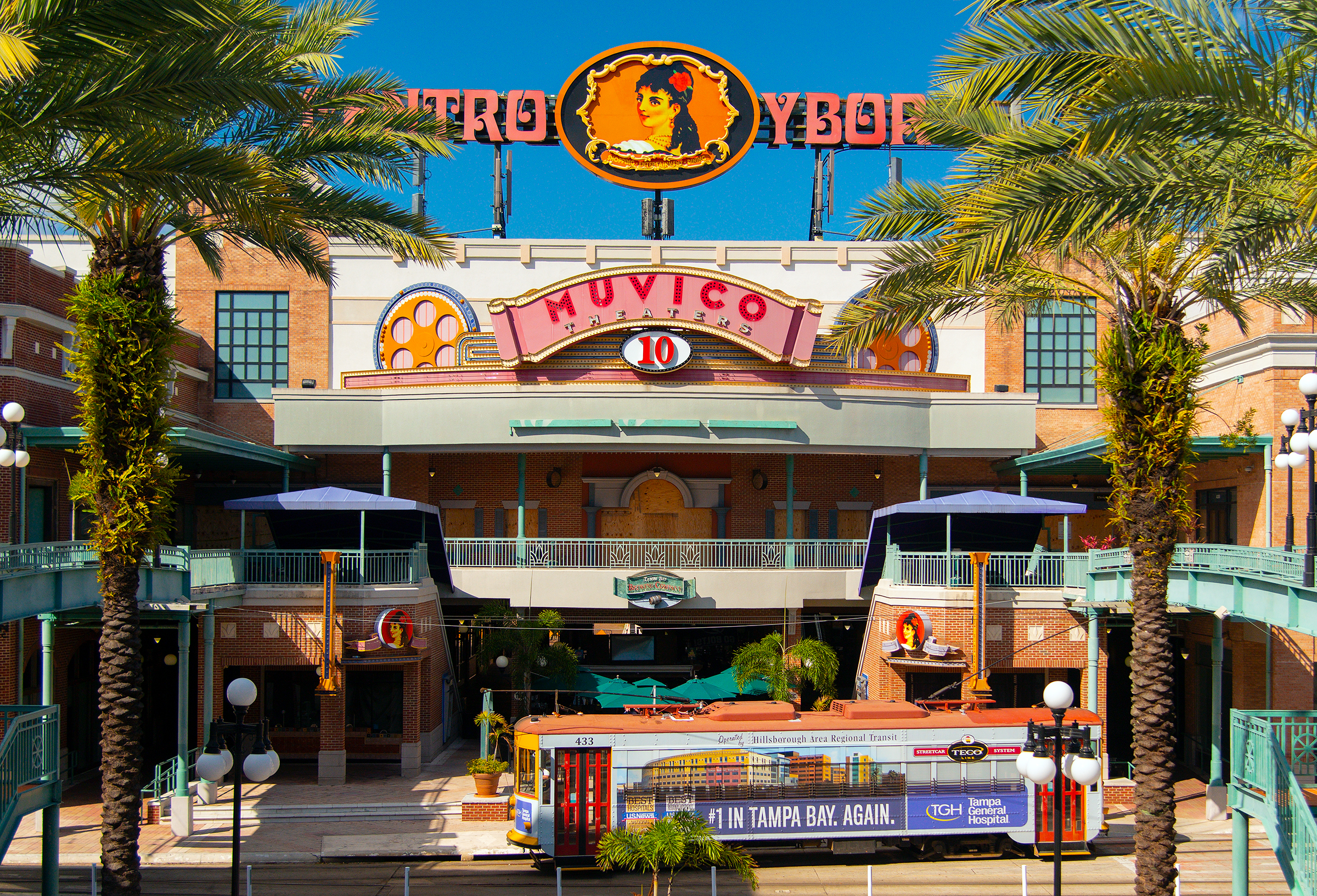
  Centro Ybor complex in Ybor City
- Ybor City Museum State Park
- Yellow Bluff Fort Historic State Park
- Yulee Sugar Mill Ruins Historic State Park

== Z ==
- Zellwood, Florida
- Zephyrhills Municipal Airport
- Zolfo Springs, Florida
- Zoos in Florida
  - commons:Category:Zoos in Florida

== See also ==
- Topic overview:
  - Florida
  - Outline of Florida
