= MKB =

MKB may refer to:

== Business ==
- MKB Bank, the third-biggest commercial bank in Hungary
- MKB Raduga, a Russian aerospace company
- MKB Fakel, a Russian government-owned aerospace defense corporation

== Community ==
- Moogooru Karnataka Brahmin, a sect of Kannada speaking Smartha Brahmins and follow Advaita Vedanta
- MKB Nagar, residential locality in northern part of the metropolitan city of Chennai, Tamil Nadu state, India
- MKB Veszprém, a handball club from Hungary
- M. K. B. v. Warden, a sealed case in South Florida

== People ==
- Małgorzata Kidawa-Błońska
- Marques Brownlee

== Computing ==
- Media Key Block
