= Lake Isle =

Lake Isle or Lake Island may refer to:

- Cory Lake Isles, neighborhood of Tampa, Florida
- Isle Lake (Alberta), lake in Alberta, Canada
- Lake Innisfree, lake in New Rochelle, New York, also known as Lake Isle
- Lake Isle of Innisfree, poem by William Butler Yeats
- Lake Isle, Alberta, community in Alberta, Canada
- Lake, Isle of Wight, civil parish on the Isle of Wight, England
- Lake of the Isles, lake in Minneapolis, Minnesota
- Lake island, an island in a lake
- Lake Island (Antarctica)
- Lake Island (British Columbia), Canada
- Lake Island (Western Australia), Australia, see List of islands of Perth, Western Australia#Inland islands
