= Florida bankruptcy law =

Bankruptcy in Florida is made under title 11 of the United States Code, which is referred to as the Bankruptcy Code. Although bankruptcy is a federal procedure, in certain regards, it looks to state law, such as to exemptions and to define property rights. The Bankruptcy Code provides that each state has the choice whether to "opt in" and use the federal exemptions or to "opt out" and to apply the state law exemptions. Florida is an "opt out" state in regard to exemptions. Bankruptcy in the United States is provided for under federal law as provided in the United States Constitution. Under the federal constitution, there are no state bankruptcy courts. The bankruptcy laws are primarily contained in 11 U.S.C. 101, et seq. The Bankruptcy Code underwent a substantial amendment in 2005 with the "Bankruptcy Abuse Prevention and Consumer Protection Act of 2005", often referred to as "BAPCPA". The Bankruptcy Code provides for a set of federal bankruptcy exemptions, but each states is allowed is choose whether it will "opt in" or "opt out" of the federal exemptions. In the event that a state opts out of the federal exemptions, the exemptions are provided for the particular exemption laws of the state with the application with certain federal exemptions.

== Bankruptcy Courts in Florida ==
There are three districts of bankruptcy courts in Florida, each of which is divided into divisions.

=== Southern District of Florida ===
The Bankruptcy Court the Southern District of Florida covers the southern portion of State of Florida, including, Miami-Dade, Broward, Palm Beach, and Monroe Counties. Bankruptcy Judges sit and hear cases in Miami, Ft. Lauderdale, and West Palm Beach. The Clerk of the Bankruptcy Court also maintains offices in Miami, Ft. Lauderdale, and West Palm Beach.

=== Middle District of Florida ===
The Bankruptcy Court of the Middle District of Florida covers the middle portion of the State of Florida, including Tampa, Orlando, and Jacksonville. Bankruptcy Judge sit and hear cases in various locations, including Tampa, Orlando, and Jacksonville.

=== Northern District of Florida ===
The Bankruptcy Court of the Northern District of Florida covers the northern portion of the State of Florida, including Tallahassee. There is only one bankruptcy judge in the Northern District and he sits and hears cases in Tallahassee.

== Filing for Bankruptcy ==
=== Filing Fees ===
The filing fees for bankruptcy are determined by the federal government and are adjusted periodically. People below a certain income level may be eligible to pay the filing fee in installments.

=== Attorney Representation ===
Most people file for bankruptcy relief represented by an attorney due to the complexity of the bankruptcy laws. There are lawyers who specialize in bankruptcy law and there are those that practice bankruptcy law as a part of their general practice. Filing for chapter 13 bankruptcy has become so complex over the years, especially due to the 2005 Bankruptcy Code, that very few person are able to successfully file and complete a chapter 13 case.

=== Pro-Se ===
Some individuals file for bankruptcy without the assistance of an attorney. Filing for bankruptcy without an attorney is called in the law, filing pro se. The bankruptcy court highly recommend that you only file for bankruptcy with the assistance of an attorney. Many people file pro se to stop a foreclosure sale and do not intend to complete the bankruptcy case. In fact its estimated that about one third of the chapter 13 cases filed in the Bankruptcy Court for the Southern District of Florida are filed pro se and are not pursued after the filing of the case and the imposition of the automatic stay, and the cases are dismissed within about a month after their filing. In some instances, volunteer bankruptcies lawyer are available to assist low-income people in filing for bankruptcy relief.

=== Bankruptcy Forms ===
Official forms are used in filing a bankruptcy case. A bankruptcy case is begun with the filing of the official form B1 bankruptcy petition. The filing of a chapter 7 or chapter 13 personal bankruptcy case also requires the filing of schedules A through J, the statement of financial affairs as well as the form B22 means test.

== Personal Bankruptcy ==
=== Chapter 7 ===
The Bankruptcy Code's provisions for chapter 7 bankruptcy relief are generally found in chapter 7 of the Bankruptcy Code. Sometimes chapter 7 bankruptcy is referred to as "straight bankruptcy" or "liquidation bankruptcy", but these terms are basically a holdover from the past and are not helpful and are misleading. Basically, chapter 7 bankruptcy provides for the discharge of dischargeable debt, which does not include non-dischargeable debt, such as most student loans, alimony, child support, and some taxes. In most cases, filers under chapter 7 incur no liquidation of their property as all of their property is "exempt." Instances of the liquidation of property under chapter 7 is generally only found when the person wrongfully files under chapter 7 when they should have filed under chapter 13 or should not have filed for bankruptcy at all.

=== Chapter 13 ===
The purpose of chapter 13 is to reorganize a person's financial situation while under the protection of the bankruptcy court. The reorganization is based on a chapter 13 plan proposed by the debtor which is effective when approved by the bankruptcy court.

=== Chapter 11 ===
Chapter 11 bankruptcy is available to both individuals and businesses, but there are very few individual chapter 11 cases filed.

== Business Bankruptcy ==
=== Generally ===
Almost all of the chapter 11 cases filed in Florida are by businesses, such as corporations and LLCs. Many of the businesses located in Florida, though may file in another states, such as Delaware or New York, due to various reasons. One of the first significant occasions was the filing of the Eastern Airlines chapter 11 case in New York which was based on the fact that one of its small subsidiaries was located in New York.

=== Chapter 7 ===
A business may file for chapter 7 bankruptcy liquidation. There is a misunderstanding among many people that a business is required to file for bankruptcy when it is closing for financial distress reasons. Actually in the vast majority of cases, a business may close and wind-down the business informally or formally under the applicable entity's provisions in Florida Statutes. When a business files for chapter 7 bankruptcy, A bankruptcy trustee is appointed who steps in and takes control of the business and its assets.

=== Chapter 11 ===
A business may file for chapter 11 bankruptcy relief for a variety of purposes. Although chapter 11 is generally regarded as being for the purposes of reorganization, many businesses file for chapter 11 to effectuate a sale of the business or an orderly liquidation of the business.

== Exemptions ==
=== Generally ===
Upon the filing of a bankruptcy case, generally all of the debtor's property becomes property of a bankruptcy estate. A bankruptcy estate is defined broadly in the Bankruptcy Code to includes all of the debtor's rights to property. The use of exemptions is generally only in personal bankruptcy case and not in business cases, such as those filed under chapter 7 and chapter 11, filed by an entity, except by business operated as a sole proprietorship. Bankruptcy exemptions that apply in Florida are generally set forth in several locations, including the Bankruptcy Code, Federal Statutes, Florida Constitution, Florida Statutes, and Florida common law.

=== Real Property ===
==== Homestead ====
Article X, section 4 of the Florida Constitution provides for the Florida Homestead exemption. This type of "homestead exemption" should be distinguished from the homestead exemptions provided related to property taxation and inheritance purposes.

=== Personal Property ===
Certain personal property is exempt from the bankruptcy estate in Florida.

==== General Personal Property, Household Goods ====
Article X, section 4 of the Florida Constitution provides for the exemption of $1,000 of personal property, which is doubled if the bankruptcy case is a joint filing with a spouse. Florida statutes provides for an additional $4,000 exemption for personal property if the person does not have the benefit of the Florida homestead exemption.

==== Wages ====
Florida Statute section 222.11 provides for a limited exemption of wages.

==== Vehicles ====
Florida Statutes provides for the exemption of $1,000 in value of a vehicle. This is applied to the equity in the vehicle in the event there is a lien on the vehicle for a loan.

=== Intangible Personal Property ===
==== Life Insurance ====
Florida Statutes provides for a certain exemption of life insurance in section 222.13 and in section 222.14

==== Annuities ====
Florida Statutes 222.14 provides for a certain exemption of annuities.

==== Retirement Benefits ====
Most retirement benefits, including IRAs, 401(k) plans, and social security, are exempt in Florida.

==== Workers' Compensation Benefits ====
Florida Statutes provides for a certain exemption for workers' compensation benefits.

==== Unemployment Benefits ====
Florida Statutes provides for a certain exemption for unemployment benefits.

== Property Excluded from the Bankruptcy Estate ==
=== Tenants by the Entireties ===
Real or personal property held among spouses as tenants by the entireties is not owned solely by the individual but is owned by the marriage. Due to this status of ownership, property held as tenants by the entireties is generally exempt or not subject to the claims of the creditors of one of the spouses in Florida. This common law exemption is generally applicable to real property as well as personal property, but must be relied upon with caution as it may be difficult to prove that the property is actually held as tenants by the entireties, especially as to personal property, and as the application of this exemption various among different bankruptcy judges.

=== Spendthrift Trusts ===
Spendthrift trusts are technically not "exempt" from the bankruptcy estate, but are "excluded" from the bankruptcy estate pursuant to section 541(d) of the Bankruptcy Code. A spendthrift trust is a creature of Florida state law and must meet is requirements in order to be considered a spendthrift trust.

=== Bare Legal Title ===
Property in which the debtor only holds bare legal title, is not part of the bankruptcy estate under section 541(d) of the Bankruptcy Code.

== Creditors ==
A creditor is a person or entity that holds a claim against the debtor or the property of a debtor. The claim may have the status of an administrative claim, priority claim, a secured claim, or a general unsecured claim. There are various procedures that a creditor must follow in order to protect their interests. In most instances, a creditor must file a proof of claim form with the clerk of the involved bankruptcy court. Such proof of claim form generally must be filed before the "bar date" set in each case.

== Involuntary Bankruptcy ==
Although almost all bankruptcy cases are filed voluntarily by the debtor, the Bankruptcy Code also provides for the filing of an involuntary bankruptcy case against a person or business entity by creditors. The purpose of the filing of a petition for Involuntary bankruptcy case is usually as a means by creditors to collect on debts.

== Appeals from the Bankruptcy Courts ==
=== United States District Court ===
The first level of appeal from a Bankruptcy Court is normally to the United States District Court for the same district of the bankruptcy court. Sometimes, appeals are allowed to be taken directly to the 11th Circuit Court of Appeals.

=== 11th Circuit Court of Appeals ===
The 11th Circuit Court of Appeals hears appeals from the United States District Court. It also hears appeals directly from the bankruptcy court in certain circumstances. The 11th Circuit Court of Appeals is headquartered in Atlanta, Georgia, but has several local locations.

=== United States Supreme Court ===
Appeals from the 11th Circuit Court of Appeals are taken to the United States Supreme Court in Washington, DC. Throughout the history of the bankruptcy laws in the United States, the U.S. Supreme Court has made very important decisions regarding the nature of the bankruptcy courts and other issues of bankruptcy law. Among the most extremely Important cases are Northern Pipeline v. Marathon Pipel Line and Stern v. Marshall,. These cases related to the power and jurisdiction of bankruptcy courts under article III of the United States Constitution to render judgment in certain types of cases.

== Other Chapters of the Bankruptcy Code ==
=== Chapter 12 ===
Chapter 12 of the Bankruptcy Code provides for bankruptcy relief for family farmers and fisherman. Chapter 12 is somewhat of a hybrid of chapter 13 and chapter 11 bankruptcy. There are somewhat few chapter 13 cases filed in Florida, except in the Bankruptcy Courts for the Northern District of Florida.

=== Chapter 9 ===
Chapter 9 of the Bankruptcy Code provides bankruptcy relief for certain types of governmental entities.

=== Chapter 15 ===
Chapter 15 of the Bankruptcy Code provides for the coordination of bankruptcy cases in the United States with bankruptcy and insolvency cases filed in other countries.

== Bankruptcy Court Rules of Procedure ==
The rules governing procedure in bankruptcy courts are the Federal Rules of Bankruptcy Procedure. Many sections of the Federal Rules of Bankruptcy Procedure adopt general Federal Rules of Civil Procedure. Bankruptcy Courts in Florida also have local rules of procedure.

As bankruptcy courts are federal courts, the Federal Rules of Evidence.

== Research ==
=== Personal Bankruptcy ===
Information for filing for personal bankruptcy relief under chapter 7 and chapter 13 is provided on the website of the federal courts and various organization, such as the National Association of Consumer Bankruptcy Attorneys,

=== Business Bankruptcy ===
The website of the American Bankruptcy Institute provides much information about business bankruptcy law.

=== Case Law ===
The case law regarding bankruptcy law is primarily to be found in the decisions of the bankruptcy courts, the district courts, the courts of appeals, the bankruptcy appellate panels, and the U.S. Supreme Court. Case law is available on some Bankruptcy Court's websites.

=== Current Issues ===
There are many blogs on the internet that provide many article on current bankruptcy law issues.
