= The Florida Network of Youth and Family Services =

US non-profit association

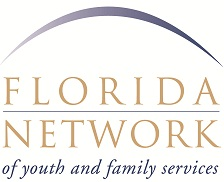

The Florida Network of Youth and Family Services is a non-profit statewide association and contract management entity, of 31 agencies dealing with runaway, truant, ungovernable and other troubled youth and their families.

== History ==
The Florida Network of Youth and Family Services ("The Florida Network") was founded in 1976. It has a special statutory designation to provide its youth crisis centers services specifically as a "Children/Families In Need of Services" (CINS/FINS) organization.

Originally, there were seventeen Florida Network crisis shelters providing services in specialized client intake, crisis stabilization, residential and non-residential counseling, and case management.

Eventually, the Florida Network of Youth and Family Services would expand to 31 crisis agencies and community-based organizations, while adding onto its plate contract monitoring (in 2001, the Florida Department of Juvenile Justice would give it exclusive contract management responsibility for CINS/FINS), data collection, quality improvement, staff training, communications and fundraising.

Moreover, it would receive recognition from the American Bar Association and the Vera Institute of Justice for its path-breaking program model, while also being profiled by The New York Times for its early efforts to help at-risk teenagers.
