= Sumter County Library System =

The Sumter County Library System (SCLS) consists of five locations throughout Sumter County.

== Locations ==
The Sumter County Library District (SCLS) consists of five library locations throughout the Sumter County area.

Name	Address
Bushnell Public Library	402 N. Florida St. Bushnell, FL 33513
E.C. Rowell Public Library	2810 C-478A Webster, FL 33597
Library Administrative Office	7375 Powell Road Suit 150 Wildwood, FL 34785
Panasoffkee Community Library	1500 CR 459 Lake Panasoffkee, FL 33538
Villages Public Library at Belvedere	325 Belvedere Boulevard The Villages, FL 32162
Villages Public Library at Pinellas Plaza	7375 Powell Road Suite 100 Wildwood, FL 34785

SCLS also operates the Library on Wheels with multiple stops in the community.
