= Florida Small Business Development Center Network =

The Florida SBDC Network has more than 40 offices and provides tools, training, and resources to small businesses.

== History ==
The FSBDC was founded at the University of West Florida in 1976 as one of the eight original state-based Small Business Development Center pilots funded by the U.S. Small Business Administration. Other participating schools in the program were California State Polytechnic University at Pomona, California State University at Chico, The University of Georgia, University of Missouri, the University of Nebraska at Omaha, Rutgers University and the University of Southern Maine. The schools were chosen based on their pre-existing efforts to further the business community in their areas.

The goal of these SBDC pilots was to link the state's higher education system to community outreach, specifically to aid in the development and education of Florida's entrepreneurs and small business community. Today, the FSBDC is one of the 63 SBA funded SBDC programs located in every state and US territory.

The FSBDC began with two centers in its first year of operation. It has since grown to a statewide network of over 35 centers. These centers are partnered with universities, colleges, and other economic organizations. Additionally, they have over 60 outreach locations to provide entrepreneurial services on an as-needed basis in rural and outlying areas.

The FSBDC is state designated as Florida's Principal Provider of Business Assistance and is the only statewide provider of entrepreneurial services in Florida.

== Support and funding ==
The Florida SBDC Network is funded in part by the U.S. Small Business Administration (SBA), Defense Logistics Agency, the State of Florida, and other private and public partners, with the University of West Florida serving as the Network's designated lead host institution. The Florida SBDC Network is nationally accredited by the Association of SBDCs (Florida Small Business Development Center).

== Services ==
The Florida SBDC's primary services:

- Consulting: one-on-one, confidential business development consulting provided at no cost
- Training entrepreneurial, business, and management development training
- Informational: access to business information and research

Services include:

- Start-up Assistance
- Business Plan Assistance
- Strategic Plan Assistance
- Market/Sales Growth Assistance (including International Trade, Government Contracting, Business Continuation, and Growth Acceleration)
- Financial and Capital Access Assistance
- Cash Flow Management Assistance

== Small business classifications ==
Florida SBDCs serve the needs of organizations that meet the definition of a small business. The FSBDCN separates small businesses into four markets: pre-venture individuals, start-up businesses, micro businesses, and small and medium-sized enterprises.

1. Pre-Venture Individuals are defined as individuals exploring the possibility of starting a new business. They have no employees, no sales, and have not secured financing.
2. Start-up businesses are defined as individuals in business for less than three years. They are defined by the amount of time they have been in business and not by their employment of revenues. They are generally in the phase of development with prospects for growth.
3. Micro businesses are defined as businesses operating for three or more years with fewer than five full-time employees. They are beyond the phases of development with promise for growth in employment and revenue.
4. Small and medium size enterprises have been in business for three or more years with 5 or more full-time employees.

== Accreditation ==
The FSBDC has been designated by the state of Florida as the principal provider of business assistance in the state. The FSBDC is accredited by the National Association of Small Business Development Centers.

Additionally, the FSBDC requires all business consultants to undergo training to be certified as business analysts for the organization. Consultants are chosen based on their education and business experience. These Certified Business Analysts (CBAs) are also required to attend training sessions to renew their certification every three years.

== Impact and reach ==
In 2020, the Florida SBDC Network delivered more than 162,500 hours of consulting to more than 24,000 small businesses, resulting in 38,797 jobs impacted, $7.4 billion in sales generated, $553.5 million in capital accessed, and $488.1 million in government contracts acquired.

A recent independent survey, the Economic Impact of the SBDC Business Development Activities on the Florida Economy, the Florida SBDC Network returns $60 to the state economy for every $1 invested.

== State office ==
The State Office was established in Pensacola after one of the eight original SBDC pilots were started at the University of West Florida (UWF). UWF is the lead host institution in the Florida SBDC Network. While each SBDC must report to its host institution, all centers must report to the State Office in Pensacola. The State Office is responsible for all the programmatic activities and financial reporting to partners. The State Office works directly with all funding partners to ensure each of the offices in Florida are properly allocating the funding given to them.

UWF has primary responsibility for administering the Florida SBDC Network Program and providing leadership, administrative services, and coordination with the SBA through the Cooperative Agreement.
