= Madison County Courthouse (Florida) =

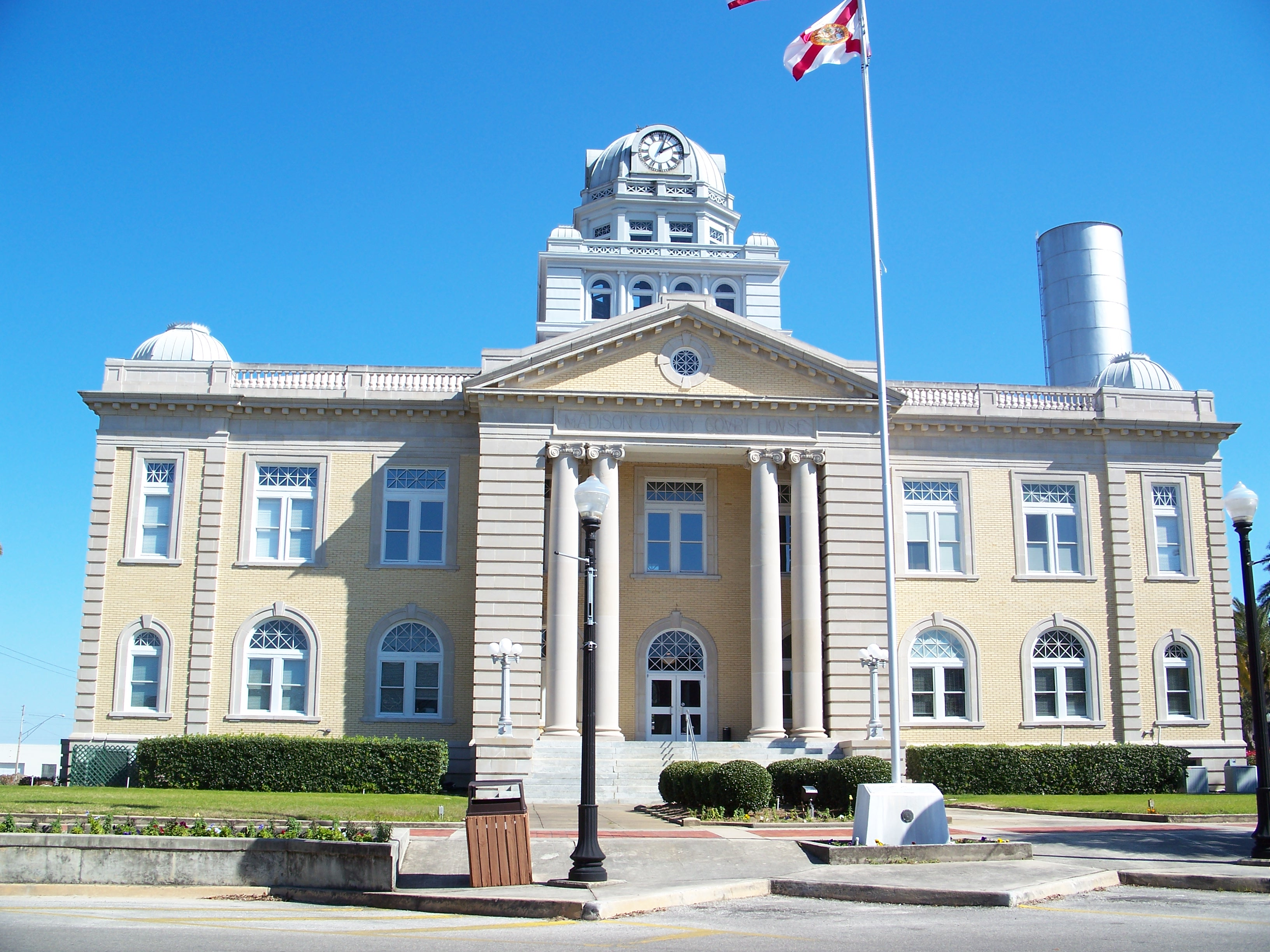
- 1913 Madison County Courthouse with 1894 city water standpipe behind it
- Interactive map of the Madison County Courthouse area

General information
- Architectural style: Neo-Classical
- Location: Madison, Florida, United States
- Coordinates: 30.469191°N 83.412921°W
- Completed: 1913
- Client: Madison County

The Madison County Courthouse, built in 1913, is a historic courthouse building located in Madison, Florida. It is Madison County's fourth courthouse and the third built in Madison. The first log building at San Pedro was abandoned along with the town. The second courthouse built in 1840 in Madison burned in 1876 and was replaced by an 1880 brick structure which burned in 1912. The present building is unusual among Florida courthouses of its vintage in never having been added onto or expanded. In 1989, the Madison County Courthouse was listed in A Guide to Florida's Historic Architecture, published by the University of Florida Press.
