= Florida Russian Lifestyle Magazine =

Magazine about Russian-speaking Floridians

Florida Russian Lifestyle Magazine is a free online magazine written by Russian-speaking people living in the U.S. state of Florida. It is owned and published by Aurous Publishing. The content is in the Russian and English language with original articles, photos and videos of life in Florida from the Russian speakers perspective. The site also features resources to help those relocating to Florida, such as a job search board, Russian business directory and coverage of community events.

== History ==
- Web launch - August 2010
- Apple iPhone Application - September 2010
- Apple iPad Application - January 2012
- HTML5 Compliant Platform launched - January 2014

== Awards ==
Chosen as Official Magazine of Russian-American Community Center of Florida - June 2010
