= Florida Rural Broadband Alliance =

The Florida Rural Broadband Alliance LLC, abbreviated FRBA, was a limited liability corporation established to deploy broadband Internet services in rural parts of Florida. It filed for bankruptcy in 2016.

It was funded by a grant through the American Recovery and Reinvestment Act of 2009, the federal stimulus bill, in an effort to provide high-speed Internet access to 15 Florida counties.

== History ==
FRBA was first created in March 2010 by two nonprofit economic development corporations: Florida's Heartland Regional Economic Development Initiative, or REDI, in south central Florida, and Opportunity Florida in northwest Florida.

FRBA encompasses 15 Florida counties and communities - Holmes, Washington, Jackson, Gadsden, Calhoun, Liberty, Gulf, Franklin, Hardee, DeSoto, Highlands, Okeechobee, Glades, and Hendry counties as well as the community of Immokalee.

The initial goal was to win a federal grant under the Broadband Technology Opportunities Program through the American Recovery and Reinvestment Act of 2009 and deploy a middle mile broadband transport network in underserved rural areas of Florida.

FRBA applied for a $24 million grant through the program in mid-2010, winning the grant later that year.

== Rural Area of Critical Economic Concern ==
The two FRBA geographic areas are known as Rural Areas of Critical Economic Concern through Florida's Rural Economic Development Initiative, or REDI.

Rural counties qualify for REDI with populations of less than 100,000 and exhibit low per capita income, low per capital taxable values, high unemployment or underemployment, and other poor economic factors.

The designation is provided by the Governor's Office of Tourism, Trade and Economic Development, and are re-evaluated each year for REDI eligibility.

== Middle Mile Project ==
When completed, the FRBA broadband project will deliver up to 1 Gbps capacity throughout the region, more than 1,000 times the current capacity available to public and private entities in the region.

The system is being designed using microwave links, sending data wirelessly from one focused point to the next using existing cellular towers.

This network, when commercial Internet service providers connect with it, will provide broadband Internet to more than 174,000 households and 16,400 businesses.
