= The Florida Interurban Railway and Tunnel Company =

Defunct American railroad company

The Florida Interurban Railway and Tunnel Company is a defunct American railroad company.

== History ==
The Florida Interurban Railway and Tunnel Company was incorporated in 1912 by the Bates Real Estate Interests and partners, who had extensive backgrounds in railroading with the Seaboard Air Line Railroad.

The railway was intended to link Jacksonville with both St. Augustine and Pablo Beach with a 45-mile rail network. The tunnel would have had the additional benefit of being the first man-made crossing of the St. Johns River and was planned for interurbans and streetcars as well as automobiles and pedestrians.

The opening of the St. Elmo Acosta toll Bridge in 1921 connected both sides of the river and was used by streetcars, automobiles, and pedestrians. After this, nothing more was heard from the Florida Interurban Railway and Tunnel Company.
