= Old Wakulla County Courthouse =

- U.S. National Register of Historic Places
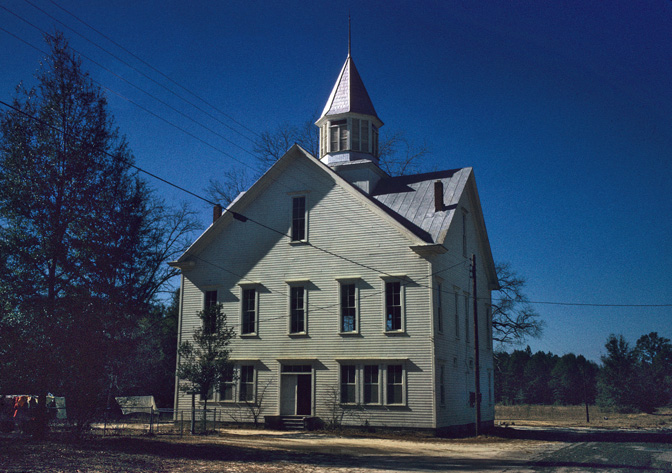
- Old Wakulla County Courthouse, photographed in 1970

- Location within Florida Location within the United States
- Interactive map showing the location of Old Wakulla County Courthouse
- Location: Crawfordville, Florida
- Coordinates: 30°10′30″N 84°22′35″W
- NRHP reference No.: 76000607
- Added to NRHP: May 3, 1976

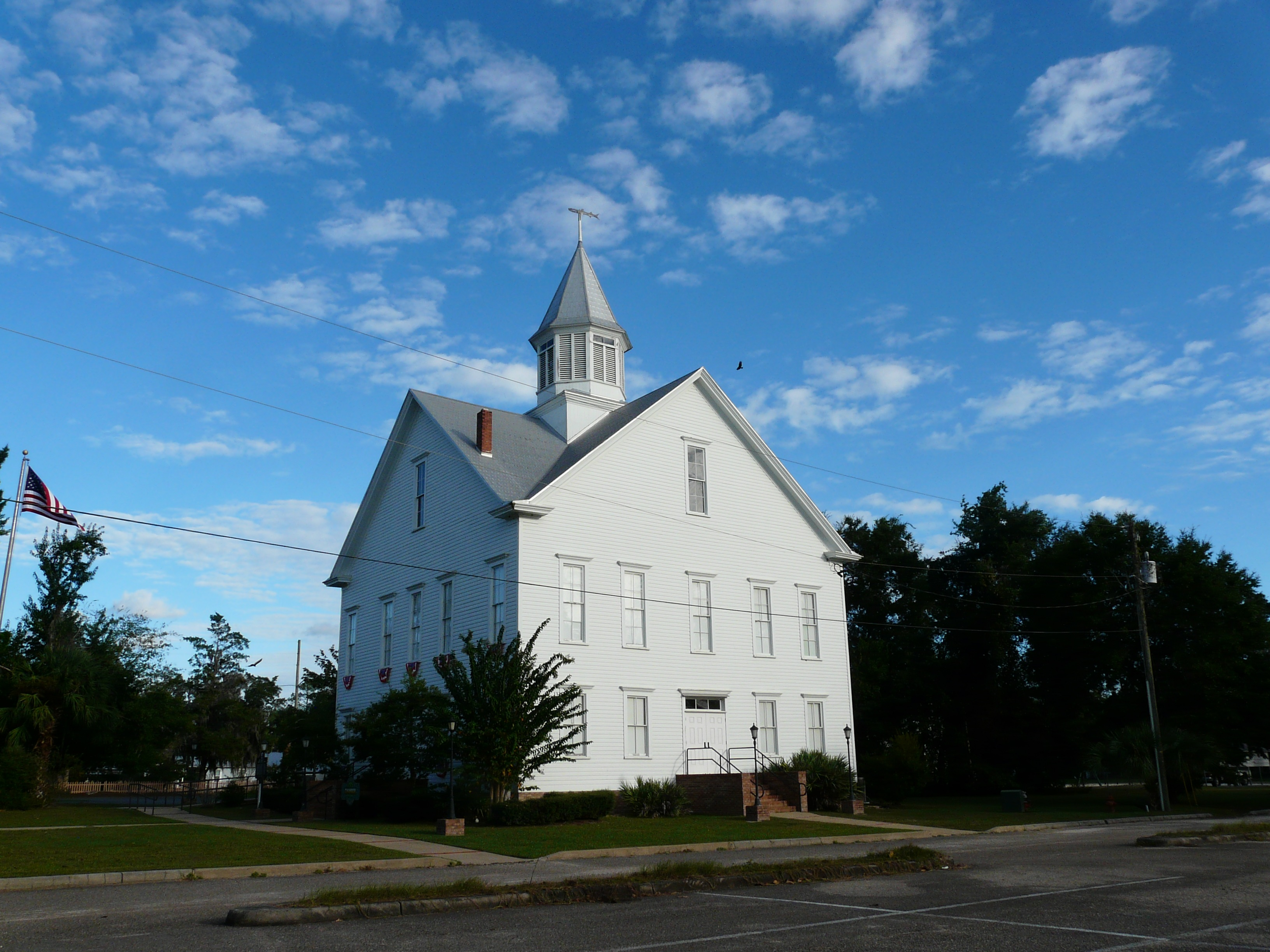
Old Wakulla County Courthouse in 2025

The Old Wakulla County Courthouse (constructed in 1892–1893) is a historic site in Crawfordville, Florida, located at Church Street. On May 3, 1976, it was added to the U.S. National Register of Historic Places. Thought to be Florida's last wood-frame courthouse still in use, it was restored and became a Wakulla County library.
