= Florida High Tech Corridor Council =

American non-profit organisation

The Florida High Tech Corridor Council (The Corridor) is a regional economic development initiative of the University of Central Florida (UCF), the University of South Florida (USF) and the University of Florida (UF) whose mission is to grow high tech industry and innovation through partnerships that support research, marketing, workforce and entrepreneurship.

== Overview ==
The Corridor is recognized as a prominent model for regional, high-tech-oriented economic development. The Corridor's programs serve Florida's Alachua, Brevard, Citrus, De Soto, Flagler, Hardee, Hernando, Highlands, Hillsborough, Lake, Levy, Manatee, Marion, Orange, Osceola, Pasco, Pinellas, Polk, Putnam, Sarasota, Seminole, Sumter, and Volusia counties.

The Corridor's flagship initiatives include its Matching Grants Research Program (a university-industry research investment award fund), stemCONNECT (a classroom resource to connect students with experts in industry and academia around the state) and Cenfluence (an industry cluster initiative established with support from Orange County Government).

The Corridor publishes a monthly electronic newsletter ("Connecting With The Corridor") an annual report and periodic research reports.

== Structure ==
The Corridor is structured as a Florida non profit organization, and is co-chaired by the Presidents of the University of Central Florida, the University of South Florida, and the University of Florida. The activities of The Corridor are administered by the research administration and technology transfer offices of the three universities, and a volunteer "core team" of economic development professionals and community leaders from the region's 23 counties. The Corridor maintains a business office in Orlando, Florida.

== History ==
The Corridor was initially founded in 1996 by act of the Florida Legislature to support the 21-county service areas of the University of Central Florida (UCF) and the University of South Florida (USF). Its initial objective was to foster research and education partnerships to retain the Cirent Semiconductor (a partnership between Lucent and Cirrus Logic) wafer fabrication facility in Orlando, Florida. Cirent Semiconductor was facing reinvestment levels of nearly $2 billion to refit to the next generation of silicon technology; with such a large reinvestment the company had a very real potential to relocate to another region. Semiconductor fabrication facilities were considered to be highly attractive contributors to regional and national economies, and Cirent Semiconductor was entertaining relocation incentive packages from other communities and countries many times larger than could be offered by State of Florida. Florida's offer of a combination of training and performance-based economic incentives, and the formal establishment of an academic and research partnership in the form of The Corridor was successful in convincing Cirent Semiconductor to not only reinvest in the region but to later establish a separate Bell Labs research facility in Orlando.

In 1997 the State of Florida expanded The Corridor mission to encourage development of all technology industries across the central "belt" of Florida. In 2005, the University of Florida joined as a full partner and co-chair, and the number of counties served by The Corridor increased to 23.
