= Florida Division of Vocational Rehabilitation =

Federal-stare disability employment service

Florida Division of Vocational Rehabilitation is a federal-state program in the U.S. state of Florida that provides services to people who have physical or mental disabilities to help them get or keep a job.

Its headquarters is located in Tallahassee, Florida and it has 90 local offices. Programs include Deaf/Hard of Hearing Services, Ticket to Work, Transition Youth, Mental Health, and Supported Employment.

== Program descriptions ==
Rehabworks.org

Deaf and Hard of Hearing Services ensure that VR services are provided to eligible individuals with all types of hearing loss. Necessary assistance and skills training for both employee and employer can help persons who are deaf or hard of hearing secure and retain employment.

Ticket to Work is a Social Security Administration (SSA) program available to Floridians. For those who qualify for social security benefits, tickets will be issued and may be taken to Employment Network (EN) participants, such as VR. These participants offer access to employment and rehabilitation services necessary to help a person secure and retain employment. This program is voluntary.

VR Transition Youth Services help students with disabilities train for a job, continue their education, or find a job after high school. Under this program, every youth will have the opportunity to participate in sponsored career counseling, work readiness training, and fully integrated work experiences in the community. These services are delivered while youth are still in high school.

VR coordinates services with available mental health centers, programs, and service providers to assist individuals with mental or emotional disabilities in becoming employed.

Supported Employment serves people with the most significant disabilities who have not been successful in competitive employment. The program helps individuals become employed in their community by using services such as job coaching and follow-up to promote employment stability.

=== Examples of vocational rehabilitation services ===
- Medical and Psychological Assessment
- Vocational Evaluation and Planning
- Career Counseling and Guidance
- Training and Education after High School
- Job-Site Assessment and Accommodations
- Job Placement
- Job Coaching
- On-the-Job Training
- Supported Employment
- Assistive Technology and Devices
- Time-Limited Medical and/or Psychological Treatment

== History ==
The national vocational rehabilitation movement began after World War I when war casualties set the stage for Vocational Rehabilitation legislation. The U.S. Congress realized that many soldiers disabled in the war would require special training to return to civilian occupations.

In 1918, Congress enacted the Soldier’s Rehabilitation Act to help veterans. However, the large number of people with disabilities from birth, accidents and work-related incidents that were in need of assistance stimulated Congress to pass the Smith-Fess Act of 1920. The act launched the civilian Vocational Rehabilitation program and provided funding to the states on 50/50 match. Vocational Rehabilitation evolved from a medical program serving veterans to an employment program that serves all disability populations. Florida’s Vocational Rehabilitation was established in 1925.
