= List of places in Florida =

This list of current cities, towns, unincorporated communities, counties, and other recognized places in the U.S. state of Florida also includes information on the number and names of counties in which the place lies, and its lower and upper zip code bounds, if applicable.

== See also ==
- Florida
- List of municipalities in Florida
- List of counties in Florida
