= Fred Gannon Rocky Bayou State Park =

State park in Florida, United States

- IUCN category IV (habitat/species management area)
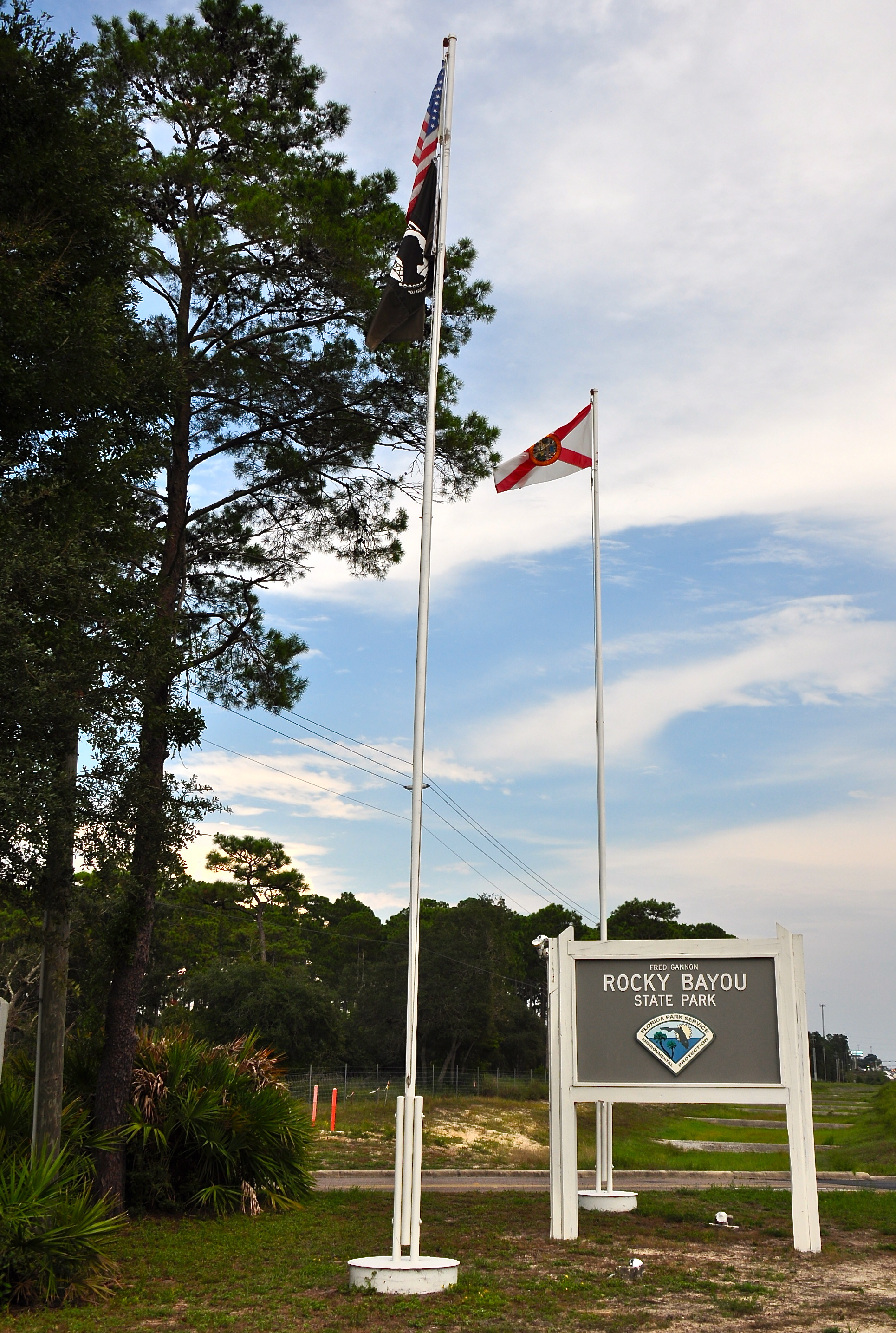
- The entrance for Fred Gannon Rocky Bayou State Park off Florida State Road 20.

- Location within Florida Location within the United States
- Interactive map of Fred Gannon Rocky Bayou State Park
- Location: Okaloosa County, Florida, USA
- Nearest city: Niceville, Florida
- Coordinates: 30°29′49″N 86°25′37″W
- Area: 346.65 acres (140.28 ha)
- Established: 1966; 60 years ago
- Governing body: Florida Department of Environmental Protection

Fred Gannon Rocky Bayou State Park is a Florida State Park located on the northwestern coast of the U.S. state of Florida, southeast of Niceville. The address is 4281 Highway 20. Native American middens and artifacts can be seen throughout the park.

== Recreational activities ==
The park has such amenities as bicycling, birding, boating, canoeing, fishing, hiking, kayaking, picnicking, tubing, wildlife viewing and full camping facilities.

== Biology ==
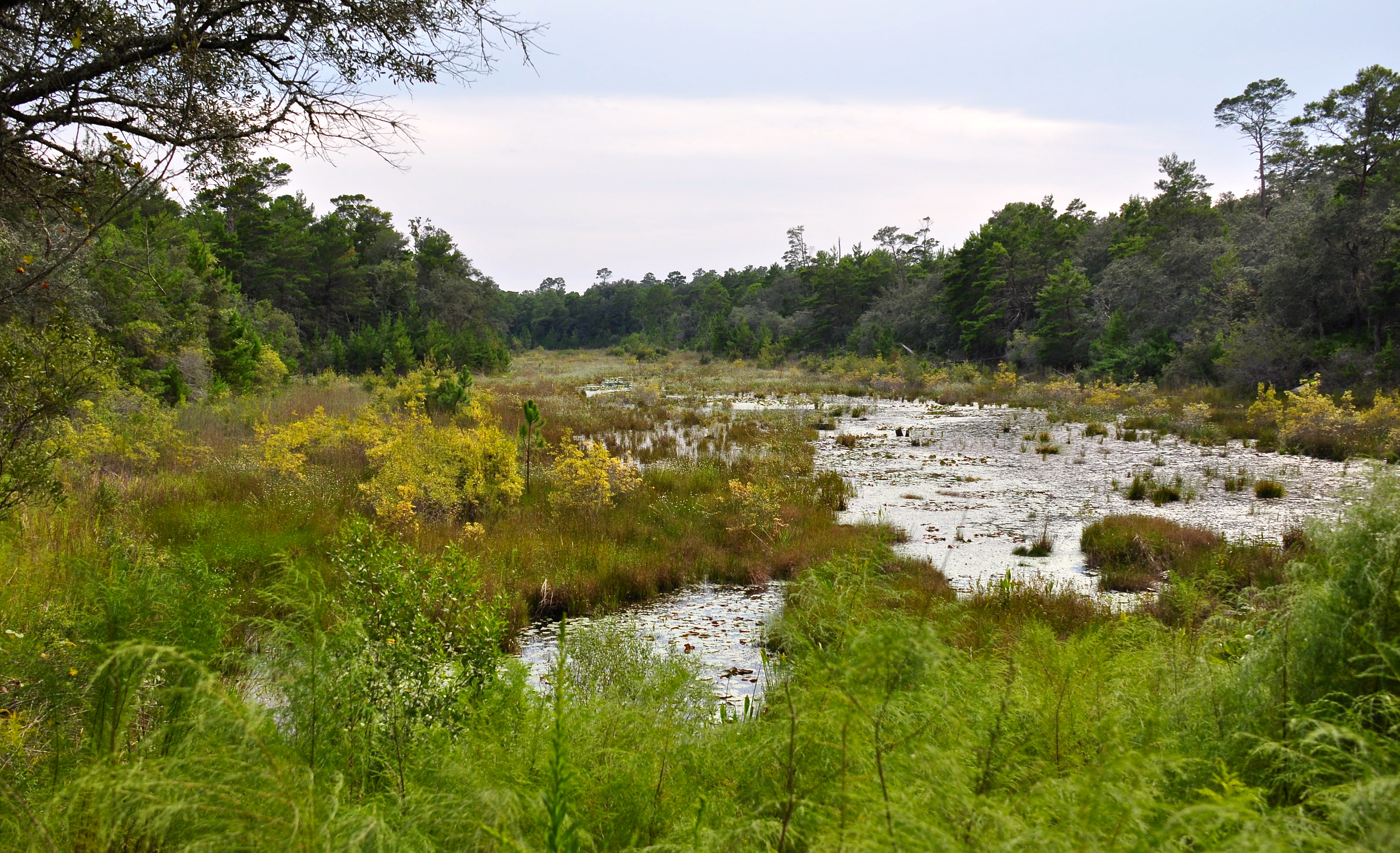
Puddin' Head Lake is currently being drained to restore the landscape to its original state as a steephead stream.

The park's Sand Pine (Pinus clausa) forest has large, mature Sand Pines towering over other scrub vegetation, such as Florida Rosemary (Ceratiola ericoides), Reindeer Moss (Cladonia spp.), and scrub oaks: sand live oak (Quercus geminata), sandhill oak (Quercus inopina), myrtle oak (Quercus myrtifolia), and Chapman's oak (Quercus chapmanii).
