= Old Brevard County Courthouse =

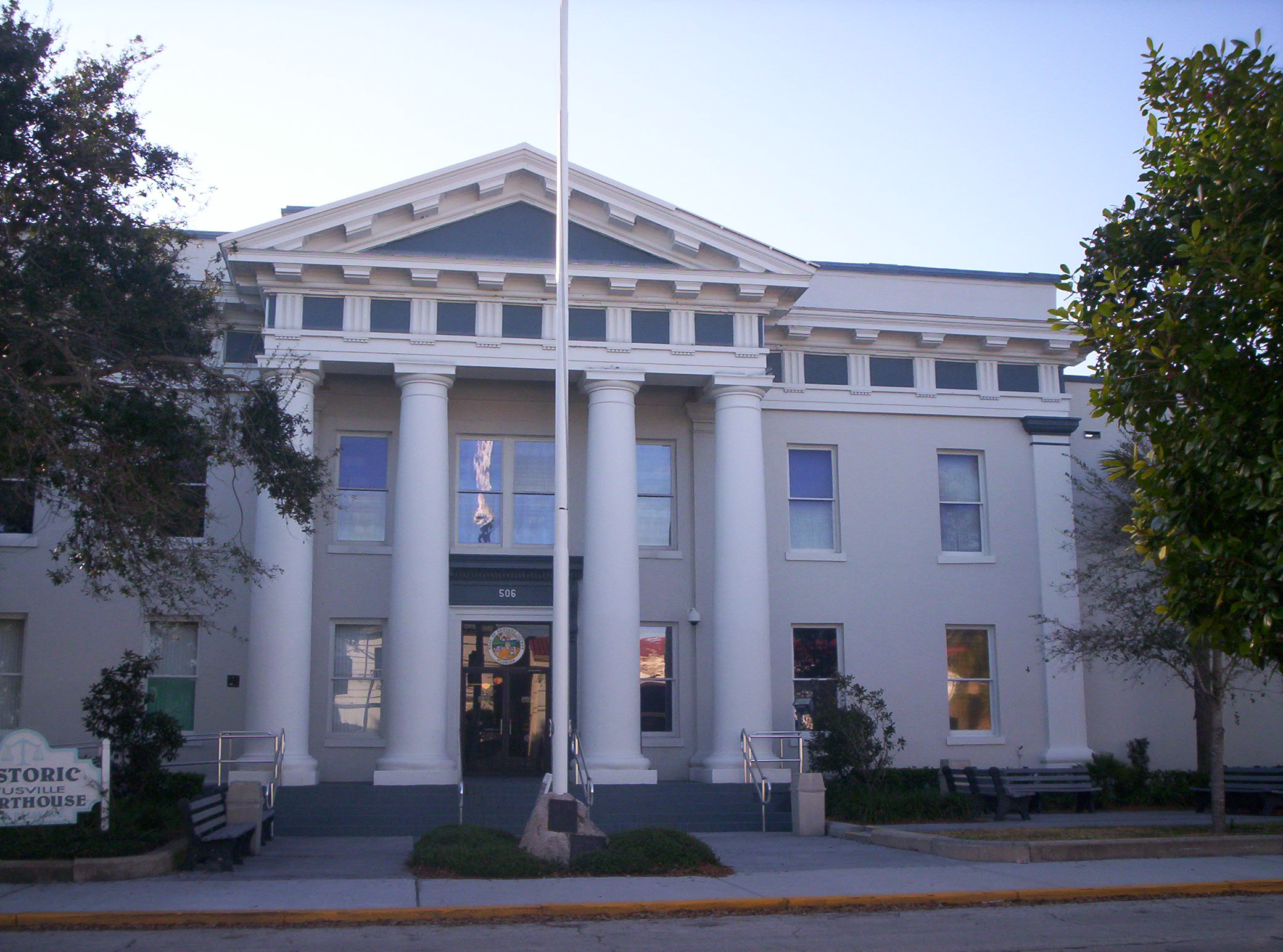
- Old Brevard County Courthouse
- Interactive map of the Old Brevard County Courthouse area

General information
- Architectural style: Classical Revival
- Location: Titusville, Florida, United States
- Coordinates: 28°36′33″N 80°48′33″W
- Construction started: 1912
- Completed: 1912
- Client: Brevard County

Design and construction
- Engineer: Builder: Lightman, McDonald and Company

The Old Brevard County Courthouse, renamed in 2006 as the Vassar B. Carlton Historic Titusville Courthouse, is an historic courthouse building located at 506 South Palm Avenue in Titusville, Florida. Designed in the Classical Revival style, it was built in 1912 by Lightman, McDonald and Company to serve as Brevard County's first courthouse building erected in Titusville.

Because of its long, narrow shape, Brevard County has centralized its governmental services in Viera, with a North Branch in Titusville and a South Branch in Melbourne. Titusville, however, still remains the official county seat. Today the Old Brevard County Courthouse is still used for some functions, but is an annex of the North Brevard Government Center located at 400 South Street in Titusville.

In 1989, the Old Brevard County Courthouse was listed in A Guide to Florida's Historic Architecture, published by the University of Florida Press. It was renamed in February 2006 in honor of the late Vassar B. Carlton (1913-2005), who served as a County Judge and then as a Circuit Judge in Brevard County from 1941 until his election to the Florida Supreme Court in 1968.
