= M. K. B. v. Warden =

United States Supreme Court case

- Supreme Court of the United States

Decided February 23, 2004
- Full case name: M. K. B., Petitioner v. Warden, et al.
- Docket no.: 03-6747
- Citations: 540 U.S. 1213 (more)

Holding
- The Court denied the petition for certiorari. It denied the Reporters Committee for Freedom of the Press leave to intervene and let both sides file their briefs under seal.

Court membership
- Chief Justice William Rehnquist Associate Justices John P. Stevens · Sandra Day O'Connor; Antonin Scalia · Anthony Kennedy; David Souter · Clarence Thomas; Ruth Bader Ginsburg · Stephen Breyer

M. K. B. v. Warden, 540 U.S. 804 (2003), 540 U.S. 1213 (2004), is a sealed case in South Florida.

M.K.B. are the initials of Mohamed Kamel Bellahouel, an immigrant Algerian waiter who was interviewed by federal officials. He has reportedly been freed on a $10,000 bond. The only information about the case was inadvertently released and reported by The Christian Science Monitor. In 2004, the United States Supreme Court notably sided with the government's request to grant the case total secrecy.
