= Cory Lake Isles =

- Neighborhood
- Location within the state of Florida
- Coordinates: 28°8′5″N 82°18′5″W
- Country: United States
- State: Florida
- County: Hillsborough
- City: Tampa

Population (2010)
  - Total: 2,261
- Time zone: UTC-5 (Eastern (EST))
  - Summer (DST): UTC-4 (EDT)
- ZIP codes: 33592 and 33647
- Area code: 813

Cory Lake Isles is a neighborhood within the city limits of Tampa, Florida. As of the 2010 census the neighborhood had a population of 2,261. The ZIP Codes serving the area are 33592 and 33647.

== Geography ==
Cory Lake Isles is surrounded by 17,000 acres (69 km^{2}) of woodlands. The neighborhood is part of the New Tampa district.

== Demographics ==
Source: Hillsborough County Atlas

At the 2010 census there were 2,261 people and 709 households residing in the neighborhood. The population density was 184/mi^{2}. The racial makeup of the neighborhood was 58% White, 13% African American, 0% Native American, 23% Asian, 2% from other races, and 4% were from two or more races. Hispanic or Latino of any race were about 12%.

Of the 709 households 31% had children under the age of 18 living with them, 75% were married couples living together, 5% had a female householder with no husband present, and 5% were non-families.

The age distribution was 31% under the age of 18, 17% from 18 to 34, 27% from 35 to 49, 18% from 50 to 64, and 7% 65 or older. For every 100 females, there were 98 males.

The per capita income for the neighborhood was $32,909. About 5% of the population were below the poverty line

== See also ==
- Neighborhoods in Tampa, Florida
