= Vehicle registration plates of Florida =

Florida vehicle license plates

Florida
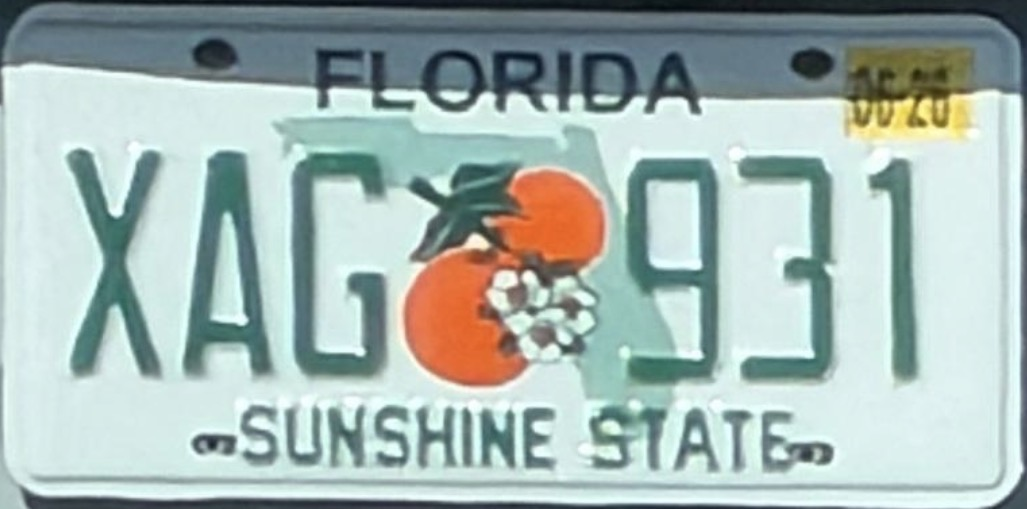
- Current orange blossom license plate without county designator

Current series
- Slogan: County name Sunshine State; In God We Trust
- Size: 12 in × 6 in 30 cm × 15 cm
- Material: Aluminum
- Serial format: ABC D12; A12 3BC; 12A BCD; 123 4AB; AB1 2CD; A12 34B; ABC 123
- Introduced: February 2026

Availability
- Issued by: Florida Department of Highway Safety and Motor Vehicles

History
- First issued: January 1, 1918 (pre-state plates from 1905 to December 31, 1917)

The U.S. state of Florida first required its residents to register their motor vehicles in 1905. Registrants provided their own license plates for display until 1918, when the state began to issue plates, becoming the last of the contiguous 48 states to do so.

As of 2026, plates are issued by the Florida Department of Highway Safety and Motor Vehicles. Only rear plates have been required since 1922 (with the exception of large trucks, which require both front and rear plates).

== Passenger baseplates ==
=== 1918 to 1974 ===
In 1956, the United States, Canada, and Mexico came to an agreement with the American Association of Motor Vehicle Administrators, the Automobile Manufacturers Association and the National Safety Council that standardized the size for license plates for vehicles (except those for motorcycles) at 6 inches (15 cm) in height by 12 inches (30 cm) in width, with standardized mounting holes. The 1955 (dated 1956) issue was the first Florida license plate that complied with these standards.

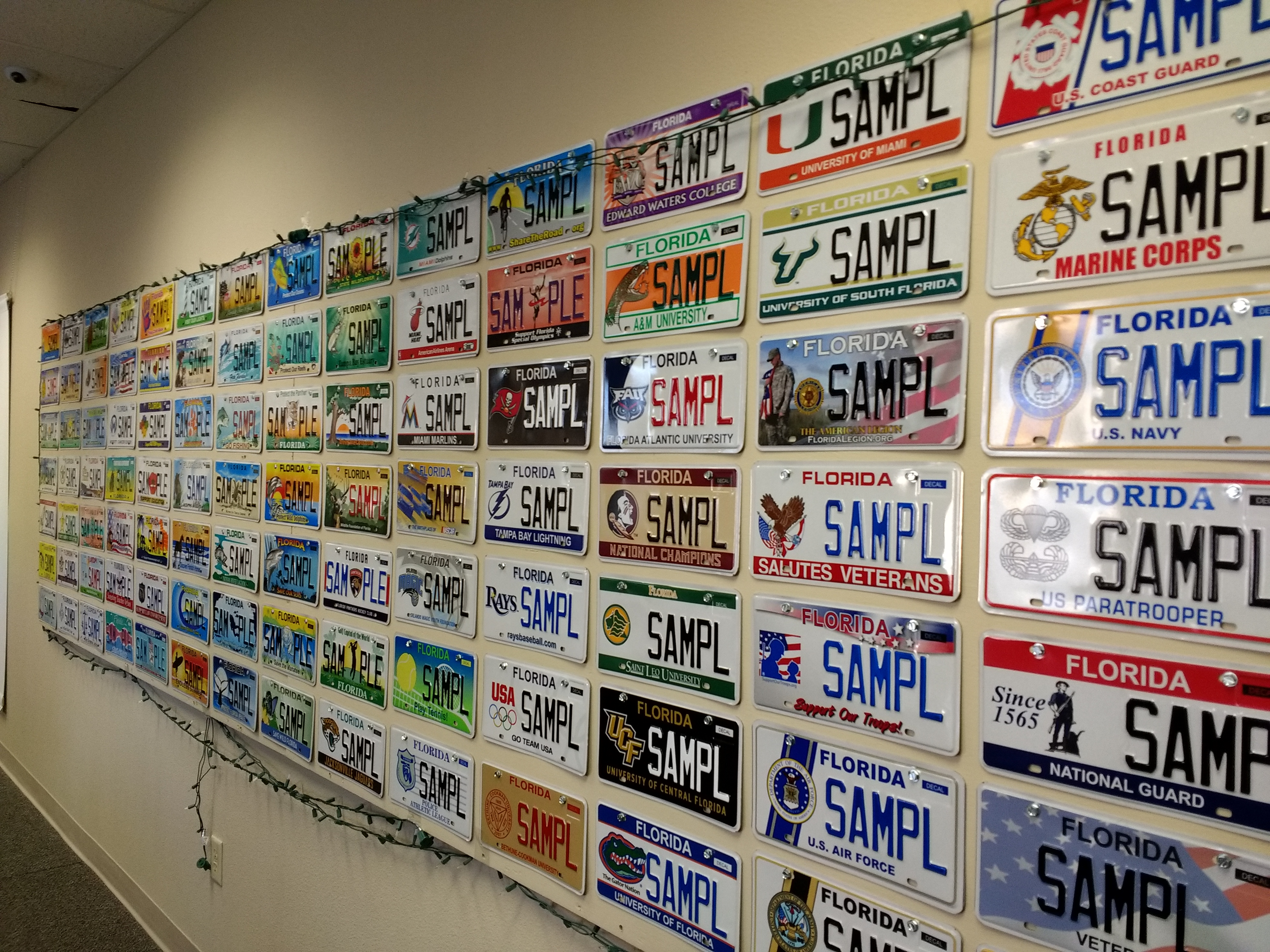
A collection of Florida license plates on the wall.

Image	Dates issued	Design	Slogan	Serial format(s)	Serials issued	Notes
No image	1918	White serial on black flat metal plate; vertical "1918" and "FLA" at left and right respectively	none	12345-A	Coded by horsepower class (A)	Horsepower classes were B (25 hp and under), C (26-40 hp) and D (41-60 hp).
No image	1919	Embossed black serial on orange plate with border line; "FLA 1919" at right	none	12345-A	Coded by horsepower class (A)	Horsepower classes were B (22 hp and under), C (23-27 hp), D (28-35 hp) and E (36 hp and over). This continued through 1921.
No image	1920	Embossed red serial on gray plate with border line; "FLA 20" at left	none	A-12345	Coded by horsepower class (A)	
	1921	Embossed white serial on brown plate with border line; "FLA 21" at right	none	12345-A	Coded by horsepower class (A)	
C-12-345	1922	Embossed white serial on green plate with border line; vertical "FLA" and "22" at right; vehicle weight on aluminum tab at bottom left	none	C-12-345	C-1 to approximately C-94-000	
No image	1923	Embossed orange serial on dark blue plate with border line; state outline at right with "FLA 23" below; vehicle weight on aluminum tab at bottom left	none	123-456-C	1-C to approximately 123-000-C	
123-456-C	1924	Embossed white serial on black plate with border line; state outline at right with "FLA 24" below; vehicle weight on aluminum tab at bottom left	none	123-456-C	1-C to approximately 156-000-C	
123-456-C	1925	Embossed orange serial on green plate with border line; "FLA" within state outline at right with "25" below; vehicle weight on aluminum tab at bottom left	none	123-456-C	1-C to approximately 250-000-C	
	1926	Embossed yellow serial on black plate with border line; "FLA" within state outline at right with "26" below	none	123-456-C	1-C to approximately 491-000-C	
	1927	Embossed white serial on black plate with border line; "FLORIDA-27" centered at bottom	none	123-456-C	1-C to approximately 409-000-C	First use of the full state name.
	1928	Embossed yellow serial on maroon plate with border line; "1928 FLORIDA" at bottom	none	123-456-C	1-C to approximately 391-000-C	
	1929	Embossed yellow serial on dark blue plate with border line; "19-FLORIDA-29" at bottom	none	C-123-456	C-1 to approximately C-321-000	
123-456	1930	Embossed white serial on dark green plate with border line; "FLORIDA–1930" at bottom	none	123-456	1 to approximately 324–000	
123-456	1931	Embossed white serial on maroon plate with border line; "1931–FLORIDA" at bottom	none	123-456	1 to approximately 313–000	
No image	1932	Embossed orange serial on black plate with border line; "FLORIDA–1932" at bottom	none	123-456	1 to approximately 288–000	First use of weight classes: all-numeric serials were used for vehicles weighing 3,000 lb and under, and serials with D prefixes for vehicles 3,001 lb and over.
No image	1932	Embossed orange serial on black plate with border line; "FLORIDA–1932" at bottom	none	D12-345	D1 to approximately D75-000	First use of weight classes: all-numeric serials were used for vehicles weighing 3,000 lb and under, and serials with D prefixes for vehicles 3,001 lb and over.
	1933	Embossed black serial on orange plate with border line; "1933–FLORIDA" at bottom	none	123-456	1 to approximately 235–000	Weight classes same as 1932, but with D used as a suffix instead of a prefix.
	1933	Embossed black serial on orange plate with border line; "1933–FLORIDA" at bottom	none	12-345D	1D to approximately 58-000D	Weight classes same as 1932, but with D used as a suffix instead of a prefix.
No image	1934	Embossed white serial on black plate with border line; "FLA." centered at top; weight class letter and "34" stamped on locking bar, displayed to left and right of state abbreviation respectively	none	T12-345; 123-456; D12-345; W 1–234	Coded by weight class	Weight classes were as follows: T (2,050 lb and under), no letter (2,051 to 3,050 lb), D (3,051 to 4,050 lb) and W (4,051 lb and over). This continued through 1941.
No image	1935	Embossed black serial on yellow plate with border line; "FLA." centered at top; weight class letter and "35" stamped on locking bar, displayed to left and right of state abbreviation respectively	none	T12-345; 123-456; D12-345; W12-345	Coded by weight class	
No image	1936	Embossed white serial on red plate with border line; "FLORIDA 1936" at top	none	T12-345; 123-456; D12-345; W12-345	Coded by weight class	
	1937	Embossed white serial on green plate with border line; "1937 FLORIDA" at top	none	12-345T; 123-456; 12-345D; 1-234 W	Coded by weight class	
	1938	Embossed yellow serial on black plate with border line; "FLORIDA" centered at top; "19" at top left and "38" at top right	none	T1-1-234; T10-123; 1-12-345; 10-1-234; D1-12-345; D10-1-234; W1-1-234; W10-123	Coded by county of issuance (1 or 10) and weight class	First use of county codes.
	1939	Embossed red serial on white plate with border line; "FLORIDA" centered at bottom; "19" at bottom left and "39" at bottom right	none	1T-1234; 10T-123; 1-12345; 10-1234; 1D12345; 10D1234; 1W-1234; 10W-123	Coded by county of issuance (1 or 10) and weight class	
	1940	Embossed white serial on black plate with border line; "FLORIDA" centered at top; "19" at top left and "40" at top right	none	1T-123; 10T-123; 1-12345; 10-1234; 1D12345; 10D1234; 1W-1234; 10W-123	Coded by county of issuance (1 or 10) and weight class	
	1941	Embossed red serial on white plate with border line; "FLORIDA" centered at bottom; "19" at bottom left and "41" at bottom right	none	1T-123; 10T-123; 1-12345; 10-1234; 1D12345; 10D1234; 1W-1234; 10W-123	Coded by county of issuance (1 or 10) and weight class	
	1942–43	Embossed orange serial on dark blue plate with border line; "FLORIDA" centered at top; "19" at top left and "42" at top right	none	1T-123; 10T-12; 1-1234; 10-123; 1D12345; 10D1234; 1W12345; 10W1234; 1WW-123; 10WW-12	Coded by county of issuance (1 or 10) and weight class	Revalidated for 1943 with dark blue tabs, due to metal conservation for World War II. Weight classes were as follows: T (<= 2,000 lb / 0.90 t), no letter (2,001 to 2,500 lb / 0.90 - 1.13 t), D (2,501 to 3,500 lb / 1.13 - 1.59 t), W (3,501 to 4,500 lb / 1.59 - 2.04 t) and WW (>= 4,501 lb / 2.04 t); this continued through 1947.
	1944	Embossed black serial on yellow plate with border line; "FLORIDA" centered at top; "19" at top left and "44" at top right	none	1T-123; 10T-12; 1-1234; 10-123; 1D12345; 10D1234; 1W12345; 10W1234; 1WW-123; 10WW-12	Coded by county of issuance (1 or 10) and weight class	
	1945	Embossed yellow serial on black plate with border line; "FLORIDA" centered at bottom; "19" at bottom left and "45" at bottom right	none	1T-123; 10T-12; 1-1234; 10-123; 1D12345; 10D1234; 1W12345; 10W1234; 1WW-123; 10WW-12	Coded by county of issuance (1 or 10) and weight class	
	1946	Embossed white serial on dark blue plate with border line; "FLORIDA" centered at top; "19" at top left and "46" at top right	none	1T-123; 10T-12; 1-1234; 10-123; 1D12345; 10D1234; 1W12345; 10W1234; 1WW-123; 10WW-12	Coded by county of issuance (1 or 10) and weight class	
	1947	Embossed white serial on forest green plate with border line; "FLORIDA" centered at bottom; "19" at bottom left and "47" at bottom right	none	1T-123; 10T-123; 1-1234; 10-123; 1D12345; 10D1234; 1W12345; 10W1234; 1WW-123; 10WW123	Coded by county of issuance (1 or 10) and weight class	
	1948	Embossed yellow serial on black plate with border line; "FLORIDA" centered at top; "19" at top left and "48" at top right	none	1T-1234; 10T-123; 1D-1234; 10D-123; 1-12345; 1-1234A; 10-1234; 10/12345; 1W12345; 10W1234; 1WW1234; 10WW123	Coded by county of issuance (1 or 10) and weight class	Weight classes same as 1942–47, except D used for the 2,001 to 2,500 lb (0.90 - 1.13 t) class and no letter for the 2,501 to 3,500 lb (1.13 - 1.58 t) class. This continued through 1961.
	1949	Embossed red serial on white plate with border line; "FLORIDA" centered at bottom; "19" at bottom left and "49" at bottom right	"SUNSHINE STATE" centered at top	1T-1234; 10T-123; 1D-1234; 10D-123; 1-12345; 1-1234A; 10-1234; 10-123A; 1W12345; 10W1234; 1WW1234; 10WW123	Coded by county of issuance (1 or 10) and weight class	First use of the "Sunshine State" slogan.
	1950	Embossed blue serial on orange plate with border line; "FLORIDA" centered at top; "19" at top left and "50" at top right	"SUNSHINE STATE" centered at bottom	1T-1234; 10T-123; 1D-1234; 10D-123; 1-12345; 1-1234A; 10-1234; 10-123A; 1W12345; 10W1234; 1WW-123; 10WW123	Coded by county of issuance (1 or 10) and weight class	
	1951	Embossed dark green serial on yellow plate with border line; "FLORIDA" centered at bottom; "19" at bottom left and "51" at bottom right	"KEEP FLORIDA GREEN" centered at top	1T-1234; 10T-123; 1D-1234; 10D-123; 1-123456; 10-12345; 1W12345; 10W12345; 1WW-123; 10WW123	Coded by county of issuance (1 or 10) and weight class	Plates with eight-character serials (counting the dash, if present) were an inch longer than plates with serials of seven characters or less. This practice continued through 1955.
	1952	Embossed orange serial on blue plate with border line; "FLORIDA" centered at top; "19" at top left and "52" at top right	"SUNSHINE STATE" centered at bottom	1T-1234; 10T-123; 1D-1234; 10D-123; 1-123456; 10-12345; 1W12345; 10W12345; 1WW-123; 10WW123	Coded by county of issuance (1 or 10) and weight class	
	1953	Embossed blue serial on orange plate with border line; "FLORIDA" centered at bottom; "19" at bottom left and "53" at bottom right	"SUNSHINE STATE" centered at top	1T-1234; 10T-123; 1D-1234; 10D1234; 1-123456; 10-12345; 1W12345; 10W12345; 1WW-123; 10WW123	Coded by county of issuance (1 or 10) and weight class	
	1954	Similar to 1952 base, but with "19" at bottom left and "54" at bottom right	"SUNSHINE STATE" as on 1952 base	1T-1234; 10T-123; 1D-1234; 10D1234; 1-123456; 10-12345; 1W12345; 10W12345; 1WW-123; 10WW123	Coded by county of issuance (1 or 10) and weight class	
	1955	Similar to 1953 base, but with "19" at top left and "55" at top right	"SUNSHINE STATE" as on 1953 base	1T-1234; 10T-123; 1D-1234; 10D1234; 1-123456; 10-12345; 1W12345; 10W12345; 1WW-123; 10WW123	Coded by county of issuance (1 or 10) and weight class	
	1956	Embossed white serial on blue plate with border line; "FLORIDA" centered at top; "19" at bottom left and "56" at bottom right	"SUNSHINE STATE" centered at bottom	1T-1234; 10T-123; 1D-1234; 10D-1234; 1-123456; 10-12345; 1W123456; 10W12345; 1WW-1234; 10WW1234	Coded by county of issuance (1 or 10) and weight class	First 6" x 12" plate.
	1957	Embossed blue serial on white plate with border line; "FLORIDA" centered at bottom; "19" at top left and "57" at top right	"SUNSHINE STATE" centered at top	1T-1234; 10T-1234; 1D-1234; 10D-1234; 1-123456; 10-12345; 1W123456; 10W12345; 1WW-1234; 10WW1234	Coded by county of issuance (1 or 10) and weight class	
	1958	Embossed white serial on dark green plate with border line; "FLORIDA" centered at top; "19" at bottom left and "58" at bottom right	"SUNSHINE STATE" centered at bottom	1T-12345; 10T-1234; 1D-1234; 10D-1234; 1-123456; 10-12345; 1W123456; 10W12345; 1WW-1234; 10WW1234	Coded by county of issuance (1 or 10) and weight class	
	1959	Embossed dark green serial on white plate with border line; "FLORIDA" centered at bottom; "19" at top left and "59" at top right	"SUNSHINE STATE" centered at top	1T-12345; 10T-1234; 1D-1234; 10D-1234; 1-123456; 10-12345; 1W123456; 10W12345; 1WW12345; 10WW1234	Coded by county of issuance (1 or 10) and weight class	
	1960	Embossed yellow serial on royal blue plate with border line; "FLORIDA" centered at top; "19" at bottom left and "60" at bottom right	"SUNSHINE STATE" centered at bottom	1T-12345; 10T-1234; 1D-12345; 10D-1234; 1-123456; 10-12345; 1W123456; 10W12345; 1WW12345; 10WW1234	Coded by county of issuance (1 or 10) and weight class	
	1961	Embossed navy blue serial on lemon yellow plate with border line; "FLORIDA" centered at bottom; "19" at top left and "61" at top right	"SUNSHINE STATE" centered at top	1T-12345; 10T-1234; 1D-12345; 10D12345; 1-123456; 10-12345; 1W123456; 10W12345; 1WW12345; 10WW1234	Coded by county of issuance (1 or 10) and weight class	
	1962	Embossed blue serial on white plate with border line; "FLORIDA" centered at top; "19" at bottom left and "62" at bottom right	"SUNSHINE STATE" centered at bottom	1D-12345; 10D12345; 1-123456; 10-12345; 1W123456; 10W12345; 1WW12345; 10WW1234; 10W/W12345	Coded by county of issuance (1 or 10) and weight class	Weight classes same as 1948–61, except D used for all vehicles 2,500 lb (1.13 t) and under. This continued until the cessation of weight classes and county codes in 1977.
	1963	Embossed white serial on blue plate with border line; "FLORIDA" centered at bottom; "19" at top left and "63" at top right	"SUNSHINE STATE" centered at top	1D-12345; 10D12345; 1-123456; 10-12345; 1W123456; 10W12345; 1WW12345; 10WW1234; 10W/W12345	Coded by county of issuance (1 or 10) and weight class	
	January 1964 – January 1965	Embossed blue serial on orange plate with border line; "FLORIDA" centered at top; "19" at bottom left and "64" at bottom right	"SUNSHINE STATE" centered at bottom	1D-12345; 10D12345; 1-123456; 10-12345; 1W123456; 10W12345; 1WW12345; 10WW1234; 10W/W12345	Coded by county of issuance (1 or 10) and weight class	
	February 1965 – February 1966	Embossed gold serial on red plate with border line; "FLORIDA" centered at bottom; "19" at top left and "65" at top right	"400TH ANNIVERSARY" centered at top	1D-12345; 10D12345; 1-123456; 10-12345; 1W123456; 10W12345; 1WW12345; 10WW1234; 10W/W12345	Coded by county of issuance (1 or 10) and weight class	Commemorated the 400th anniversary of the founding of St. Augustine, the oldest continuously inhabited European-established settlement in the continental United States.
	March 1966 – March 1967	Embossed white serial on blue plate with border line; "FLORIDA" centered at top; "19" at bottom left and "66" at bottom right	"SUNSHINE STATE" centered at bottom	1D-12345; 10D12345; 1-123456; 10-12345; 1W123456; 10W12345; 10/W-123456; 1WW12345; 10WW1234; 10W/W12345	Coded by county of issuance (1 or 10) and weight class	
	April 1967 – April 1968	Embossed white serial on black plate with border line; "FLORIDA" centered at bottom; "67" at top left and "68" at top right	"SUNSHINE STATE" centered at top	1D-12345; 10D12345; 1-123456; 10-123456; 1W123456; 10W12345; 10/W-123456; 1WW12345; 10WW1234; 10W/W12345	Coded by county of issuance (1 or 10) and weight class	
	May 1968 – May 1969	Embossed white serial on red plate with border line; "FLORIDA" centered at top; "68" at bottom left and "69" at bottom right	"SUNSHINE STATE" centered at bottom	1D-12345; 10D12345; 1-123456; 10-123456; 1W123456; 10W12345; 10/W-123456; 1WW12345; 10WW1234; 10W/W12345	Coded by county of issuance (1 or 10) and weight class	
	June 1969 – June 1970	Embossed white serial on green plate with border line; "FLORIDA" centered at bottom; "69" at top left and "70" at top right	"SUNSHINE STATE" centered at top	1D-12345; 10D12345; 1-123456; 10-123456; 1W123456; 10W12345; 10/W-123456; 1WW12345; 10WW1234; 10W/W12345	Coded by county of issuance (1 or 10) and weight class	
	July 1970 – June 1971	Embossed white serial on blue plate with border line; "FLORIDA" centered at top; "70" at bottom left and "71" at bottom right	"SUNSHINE STATE" centered at bottom	1D-12345; 10D12345; 1-123456; 10-123456; 1W123456; 10W12345; 10/W-123456; 1WW12345; 10WW1234; 10W/W12345	Coded by county of issuance (1 or 10) and weight class	
	July 1971 – June 1972	Embossed orange serial on reflective white plate with border line; "FLORIDA" centered at bottom; "72" at top right	"SUNSHINE STATE" centered at top	1D123456; 10D12345; 1-123456; 10-123456; 1W123456; 10W12345; 10/W-123456; 1WW12345; 10WW1234; 10W/W12345	Coded by county of issuance (1 or 10) and weight class	
	July 1972 – June 1973	Embossed green serial on reflective white plate with border line; "FLORIDA" centered at top; "73" at bottom right	"SUNSHINE STATE" centered at bottom	1D123456; 10D12345; 1-123456; 10-123456; 1W123456; 10W12345; 10/W-123456; 1WW12345; 10WW1234; 10W/W12345	Coded by county of issuance (1 or 10) and weight class	
	July 1973 – June 1974	As 1971–72 base, but with "74" at top right	"SUNSHINE STATE" as on 1971–72 base	1D123456; 10D12345; 1-123456; 10-123456; 1W123456; 10W12345; 10/W-123456; 1WW12345; 10WW1234; 10W/W12345	Coded by county of issuance (1 or 10) and weight class	

=== 1974 to present ===
Image	Dates issued	Design	Slogan	Serial format(s)	Serials issued	Notes
	July 1974 – March 1977	Embossed red serial on reflective white plate with border line; "FLORIDA" centered at top; "75" at top left	"SUNSHINE STATE" centered at bottom	1D123456; 10D12345; 1-123456; 10-123456; 1W123456; 10W12345; 10/W-123456; 1WW12345; 10WW1234; 10W/W12345	Coded by county of issuance (1 or 10) and weight class	Monthly staggered registration introduced July 1976, with each plate expiring in the same month as the registrant's birthday. Revalidated with stickers until 1980.
	April 1977 – February 1979	Embossed green serial on reflective white plate; "FLORIDA" centered at top	none	ABC 123	AAA 000 to approximately FBN 999	Issued only to new registrants. Letters I, O and Q not used in serials. County-name sticker added at bottom in 1978. Revalidated with stickers until 1987.
	February 1979 – February 1984	Embossed green serial on reflective white plate; orange state map screened to left of center behind serial; "FLORIDA" centered at top	County name centered at bottom	ABC 123	FBP 000 to YZZ 999; AIA 000 to YQZ 999	'M' and 'Z' series in the ABC 123 serial format reserved for dealers and rental vehicles respectively. After YZZ 999 was issued in late 1982, serials with I and Q as the first and/or second letters were issued, before the 123 ABC format was introduced. Revalidated with stickers until 1992.
	February 1984 – June; 1986	Embossed green serial on reflective white plate; orange state map screened to left of center behind serial; "FLORIDA" centered at top	County name centered at bottom	123 ABC	000 AAA to approximately 999 KTG	'M' and 'Z' series in the ABC 123 serial format reserved for dealers and rental vehicles respectively. After YZZ 999 was issued in late 1982, serials with I and Q as the first and/or second letters were issued, before the 123 ABC format was introduced. Revalidated with stickers until 1992.
	June 1986 – November 1991	Embossed red serial on reflective white plate; green state map screened to left of center behind serial; "FLORIDA" centered at top	County name centered at bottom	ABC 12D	Exclusively from AAA 00A to approximately JUQ 99Z; intermittently from JUR 00A to approximately KGW 99Z	Early plates used a lighter shade of green for the state map, while some plates manufactured during 1988 featured a smaller-size state name. Letter O not used in serials (this practice continues today); 'M' series reserved for dealers and 'Y' and 'Z' series for rental vehicles. Replaced from 1992 through 1996 as part of five-year plate replacement cycle.
	November 1991 – November 1994	As 1979–86 base	County name centered at bottom	ABC 12D	Intermittently from JUR 00A to approximately KGW 99Z; exclusively from KGX 00A to approximately RWV 99Z	
	November 1994 – July; 1997	As 1979–86 base	County name or "SUNSHINE STATE" centered at bottom	ABC 12D	Exclusively from RWW 00A to approximately XBQ 99Z; intermittently from XBR 00A to approximately XDQ 99Z	"Sunshine State" slogan reintroduced on all plates in Dade County.
	July 1997 – February 1998	Embossed green serial on reflective white plate; citrus orange graphic over green state map screened in the center; "FLORIDA" screened in orange and yellow centered at top	County name or "SUNSHINE STATE" embossed in green centered at bottom	XBC 12D	Intermittently from XBR 00A to approximately XDQ 99Z; exclusively from XDR 00A to XZZ 99Z	"Sunshine State" plates issued in Dade County (renamed Miami-Dade County in late 1997); county-name plates in all other counties.
	February 1998 – early 1999	Embossed green serial on reflective white plate; citrus orange graphic over green state map screened in the center; "FLORIDA" screened in orange and yellow centered at top	County name or "SUNSHINE STATE" embossed in green centered at bottom	AB1 23C	CY0 00X to IZ9 99Z	"Sunshine State" plates issued in Dade County (renamed Miami-Dade County in late 1997); county-name plates in all other counties.
	February 1998 – early 1999	Embossed green serial on reflective white plate; citrus orange graphic over green state map screened in the center; "FLORIDA" screened in orange and yellow centered at top	County name or "SUNSHINE STATE" embossed in green centered at bottom	A12 34B	I00 00V to L99 99Z	"Sunshine State" plates issued in Dade County (renamed Miami-Dade County in late 1997); county-name plates in all other counties.
	early 1999 – 2000	Embossed green serial on reflective white plate; citrus orange graphic over green state map screened in the center; "FLORIDA" screened in orange and yellow centered at top	County name or "SUNSHINE STATE" embossed in green centered at bottom	A12 BCD	A00 AAA to approximately B99 FWB	"Sunshine State" plates issued in Dade County (renamed Miami-Dade County in late 1997); county-name plates in all other counties.
	2000 – December 2003	Embossed green serial on reflective white plate; citrus orange graphic over green state map screened in the center; "FLORIDA" screened in orange and yellow centered at top	County name	A12 BCD	B00 FWC to approximately I99 YXW	Issued in all counties except Miami-Dade County.
	2000 – December 2003	Embossed green serial on reflective white plate; citrus orange graphic over green state map screened in the center; "FLORIDA" screened in orange and yellow centered at top	"SUNSHINE STATE"	A12 BCD	T00 AAA to approximately X99 FTJ	Issued in Miami-Dade County. First use of a separate serial block for this county.
	December 2003 – August 2004	Embossed green serial on reflective white plate; orange blossom graphic over green state map screened in the center; "MYFLORIDA.COM" screened in green centered at top	County name	A12 BCD	I00 ZAA to approximately K99 AAR	Issued in all counties except Miami-Dade County.
	December 2003 – August 2004	Embossed green serial on reflective white plate; orange blossom graphic over green state map screened in the center; "MYFLORIDA.COM" screened in green centered at top	"SUNSHINE STATE"	X12 BCD	X00 FTN to X99 ZZZ	Issued in Miami-Dade County.
	August 2004 – March 2009	Embossed green serial on reflective white plate; orange blossom graphic over green state map screened in the center; "MYFLORIDA.COM" screened in green centered at top	County name	A12 3BC	A00 0AA to N99 9ZZ	Issued in all counties except Miami-Dade County. Wider serial dies introduced 2006. ”FLORIDA” caption started at approximately LG0 01U.
	March 2009 – July; 2015	Embossed green serial on reflective white plate; orange blossom graphic over green state map screened in the center; "MYFLORIDA.COM" screened in green centered at top	County name	123 ABC	000 MAA to 999 RZZ	Issued in all counties except Miami-Dade County. Wider serial dies introduced 2006. ”FLORIDA” caption started at approximately LG0 01U.
	July 2015 – mid-2018	Embossed green serial on reflective white plate; orange blossom graphic over green state map screened in the center; "MYFLORIDA.COM" screened in green centered at top	County name	A12 BCD	Y00 AAA to Z62 JZP	Issued in all counties except Miami-Dade County. Wider serial dies introduced 2006. ”FLORIDA” caption started at approximately LG0 01U.
	mid-2018 –August 2021	Embossed green serial on reflective white plate; orange blossom graphic over green state map screened in the center; "MYFLORIDA.COM" screened in green centered at top	County name	IB1 2CD	IA0 0AA to IZ9 9ZZ	Issued in all counties except Miami-Dade County. Wider serial dies introduced 2006. ”FLORIDA” caption started at approximately LG0 01U.
	August 2021 – June 2022; April 2023 – June 2024	Embossed green serial on reflective white plate; orange blossom graphic over green state map screened in the center; "MYFLORIDA.COM" screened in green centered at top	County name	12A BCD	01B AAA to approximately 99B BIG; 01C BAA to approximately 99C KCT	Issued in all counties except Miami-Dade County. Wider serial dies introduced 2006. ”FLORIDA” caption started at approximately LG0 01U.
	June 2022 – April 2023	Embossed green serial on reflective white plate; orange blossom graphic over green state map screened in the center; "MYFLORIDA.COM" screened in green centered at top	County name	CB1 234	CA0 001 to CZ9 999	Issued in all counties except Miami-Dade County. Wider serial dies introduced 2006. ”FLORIDA” caption started at approximately LG0 01U.
	June 2024 – present	Embossed green serial on reflective white plate; orange blossom graphic over green state map screened in the center; "MYFLORIDA.COM" screened in green centered at top	County name	AB1 23C	JN0 01A to LQ9 99Z	Issued in all counties except Miami-Dade County. Wider serial dies introduced 2006. ”FLORIDA” caption started at approximately LG0 01U.
	August 2004 – late 2009	Embossed green serial on reflective white plate; orange blossom graphic over green state map screened in the center; "MYFLORIDA.COM" screened in green centered at top	"SUNSHINE STATE"	A12 3BC	P00 0AA to X99 9ZZ	Issued in Miami-Dade County. Dies changed from narrow set to wider set mid-production.
	August 2004 – late 2009	Embossed green serial on reflective white plate; orange blossom graphic over green state map screened in the center; "MYFLORIDA.COM" screened in green centered at top	"SUNSHINE STATE"	123 ABC	000 HAA to 999 LZZ; 000 VAA to 999 YZZ; 000 TAA to 999 TZZ	Issued in Miami-Dade County, as well as alternate choice in all other counties. In 2008 state changes mandatory 5 year license plate replacement to 6 years.
	November 2009 – May 2021; February 2024 – June 2024; September 2024 – November 2024; June 2025 – October 2025	Embossed green serial on reflective white plate; orange blossom graphic over green state map screened in the center; "MYFLORIDA.COM" screened in green centered at top	"SUNSHINE STATE"	ABC D12	AAA A01 to EZZ Z99; GAA A01 to LZZ Z99; NAA A01 to RZZ Z99; FBA A01 to FVZ Z99	Issued in Miami-Dade County, as well as alternate choice in all other counties. 'FA' series reserved for antique and 'M' series for motorcycles. State changes mandatory 6 year license plate replacement to 10 years.
	May 2022–June 2022	Embossed green serial on reflective white plate; orange blossom graphic over green state map screened in the center; "MYFLORIDA.COM" screened in green centered at top	"SUNSHINE STATE"	123 4AB	000 1AL to 999 9AZ	
	May 2021 – May 2022; June 2022 –August 2022; July 2023 – February 2024; November 2024 – February 2025; October 2025 – February 2026	Embossed green serial on reflective white plate; orange blossom graphic over green state map screened in the center; "MYFLORIDA.COM" screened in green centered at top	"SUNSHINE STATE"	12A BCD	01A AAA to 99B ZZZ; (except for 01B AAA to approximately 99B BIG, occupied by county name plates); 01D AAA to 99F EZZ; (except for the DK, EA, EF, EN, EP, and FA series); 01F PAA to 99G CZZ; (except for the FU, FW, and GA series); 01T GAA to 99T GZZ; 01V BAA to 99V CZZ	
	August 2022 –July 2023; February 2025 –June 2025	Embossed green serial on reflective white plate; orange blossom graphic over green state map screened in the center; "MYFLORIDA.COM" screened in green centered at top	"SUNSHINE STATE"	AB1 2CD	AF0 0AA to AZ9 9ZZ; BL0 0AA to BZ9 9ZZ; DH0 0AA to EB9 9ZZ; (except for the DV and EA series)	AA-AC, DA-DG, and EA series occupied by Apportioned. DV series occupied by disabled veteran.
	June 2024–September 2024	Embossed green serial on reflective white plate; orange blossom graphic over green state map screened in the center; "MYFLORIDA.COM" screened in green centered at top	"SUNSHINE STATE"	KB1 23C	KN0 00A to KZ9 99Z	
	November 2025	Embossed green serial on reflective white plate; orange blossom graphic over green state map screened in the center; "MYFLORIDA.COM" screened in green centered at top	"SUNSHINE STATE"	E12 34B	E00 00F to E99 99M	
	February 2026–present	Embossed green serial on reflective white plate; orange blossom graphic over green state map screened in the center; "FLORIDA" screened in green centered at top	"SUNSHINE STATE"	ABC 123	XAA 000 to XYZ 999	
	October 1, 2008 – September 2018	Embossed green serial on reflective white plate; orange blossom graphic over green state map screened in the center; "MYFLORIDA.COM" screened in green centered at top	"IN GOD WE TRUST"	123 4AB	000 1GA to 999 9YZ	Issued in all counties as no-cost alternative issue. Progression of first letter in the 123 4AB serial format: G, H, I, J, B, P, Q, T, U, V, X, Y.
	September 2018 –January 2019	Embossed green serial on reflective white plate; orange blossom graphic over green state map screened in the center; "MYFLORIDA.COM" screened in green centered at top	"IN GOD WE TRUST"	123 45Z	000 01Z to 999 99Z	
	January 2019 –February 2022	Embossed green serial on reflective white plate; orange blossom graphic over green state map screened in the center; "MYFLORIDA.COM" screened in green centered at top	"IN GOD WE TRUST"	A12 3BC	Z00 0AA to Z99 9ZZ; Y00 0AA to Y99 9ZZ	
	February 2022 –February 2026	Embossed green serial on reflective white plate; orange blossom graphic over green state map screened in the center; "MYFLORIDA.COM" screened in green centered at top	"IN GOD WE TRUST"	AB1 2CD	BB0 0AA to BH9 9ZZ; CC0 0AA to approximately CZ9 9ZZ	BA and BK series occupied by Apportioned, BJ for weighted wrecker. ”FLORIDA” caption started at approximately the CV series.
	October 31 2026		"IN GOD WE TRUST"	ABC 1234	AAA 0000 to RAZ 8950	
	December 2025	Embossed navy serial on reflective white plate; America250FL logo screened in the center; "FLORIDA" screened in navy at the center top.	"IN GOD WE TRUST"	US1 234	US0 001 to US9 999	
	December 2025-present	Embossed navy serial on reflective white plate; America250FL logo screened in the center; "FLORIDA" screened in navy at the center top.	"IN GOD WE TRUST"	USC 123	USA 001 to USH 999 (as of March 11, 2026)	

== County coding, 1938–77 ==
Florida used numeric county codes on its license plates between 1938 and 1977, with the order of the codes based on the populations of each of the state's 67 counties according to a 1935 census. There was also code 68 on plates ordered from the state tag office in Tallahassee, and code 90 on replacement plates.

Code	County
1	Dade
2	Duval
3	Hillsborough
4	Pinellas
5	Polk
6	Palm Beach
7	Orange
8	Volusia
9	Escambia
10	Broward
11	Alachua
12	Lake
13	Leon
14	Marion
15	Manatee
16	Sarasota
17	Seminole
18	Lee
19	Brevard
20	St. Johns
21	Gadsden
22	Putnam
23	Bay
24	St. Lucie
25	Jackson
26	Osceola
27	Highlands
28	Pasco
29	Columbia
30	Hardee
31	Suwannee
32	Indian River
33	Santa Rosa
34	DeSoto
35	Madison
36	Walton
37	Taylor
38	Monroe
39	Levy
40	Hernando
41	Nassau
42	Martin
43	Okaloosa
44	Sumter
45	Bradford
46	Jefferson
47	Citrus
48	Clay
49	Hendry
50	Washington
51	Holmes
52	Baker
53	Charlotte
54	Dixie
55	Gilchrist
56	Hamilton
57	Okeechobee
58	Calhoun
59	Franklin
60	Glades
61	Flagler
62	Lafayette
63	Union
64	Collier
65	Wakulla
66	Gulf
67	Liberty
68	State Tag Office
90	Replacements

== Vehicle classes, 1932–77 ==
Between 1932 and 1977, Florida used letters on its license plates that corresponded to the class of vehicle.

Through 1937, the letters were placed before or after the numeric part of the serial, depending on the year. When county codes (above) were introduced in 1938, the letters were placed before the code (e.g. G10-123 for a commercial truck in Broward County). From 1939 onwards, the letters were placed after the code, but before the rest of the serial (e.g. 10G-123).

Throughout this period, license plates without letters were used on passenger cars. In 1932 and 1933, they were used on cars weighing 3,000 lb and under; from 1934 through 1941, on cars weighing between 2,051 and 3,050 lb; and from 1942 through 1947, on cars weighing between 2,001 and 2,500 lb. From 1948 onwards, they were used on cars weighing between 2,501 and 3,500 lb, as there were now more heavy cars.

Letter	Vehicle class
A	Motorcycle
AM	Motorcycle dealer (1949–69)
AX	Tax-exempt motorcycle
B	Boat trailer
BB	Private trailer, 501 to 1050 lb
C	City bus
CV	Commercial vehicle over 2000 lbs
D	Passenger car, 3001 lb and over (1932–33); Passenger car, 3051 to 4050 lb (1934–41); Passenger car, 2501 to 3500 lb (1942–47); Passenger car, 2001 to 2500 lb (1948–61); Passenger car, 2500 lb and under (from 1962)
E	Taxi cabs, rental cars or limousines
FHP	Florida Highway Patrol vehicle
FO	Trailer for hire over 4001 lbs (half years plates with an expiration date)
G	Truck, 4000 lb and under (1932–33); Commercial truck, 2050 lb and under (from 1934)
GF	Truck for hire
GFH	Truck for hire (until 1939)
GH	Private truck, 2051 to 3050 lb (from 1934)
GK	Private truck, 3051 to 5050 lb (from 1934)
GL	Private truck, 5051 lb and over (1934–66)
GW	Private truck over 5051 lbs (from 1967)
H	Truck, 4001 lb and over (1932–33); Half-year plate (1938 to early 1950s)
HF	Truck for hire over 4051 lbs
HFH	Half year for hire vehicle
HT	House trailer
K	Ambulance
KA	Fractional Ambulance (1949)
L	Semi-trailer
M	Dealer (1932–65)
MC	Member of Congress
MF	Franchised dealer (from 1966)
MH	Mobile home
MI	Independent dealer (from 1966)
MT	Truck dealer (from 1966)
N	Rental trailer, 2001 lb and over
NN	Rental trailer, 2000 lb and under
O	Semi-trailer for hire
P	Off-road vehicle
Q	Antique passenger car
R	Light motorcycle (from 1960)
RB	Ringling Brothers (circus vehicles)
RP	Real property (for Mobile Homes that had been converted to a fixed asset)
RV	Recreational vehicle
S	Bus for hire
T	Passenger car, 2050 lb and under (1934–41); Passenger car, 2000 lb and under (1942–61)
TA	Truck tractor
TAF	Half year truck tractor
TB	Truck tractor
TBF	Half year truck tractor
TC	Truck tractor
TCF	Half year truck tractor
TD	Truck tractor
TDF	Half year truck tractor
TE	Truck tractor
TEF	Half year truck tractor
V	Private trailer, 500 lb and under
W	Passenger car, 4051 lb and over (1934–41); Passenger car, 3501 to 4500 lb (from 1942)
WW	Passenger car, 4501 lb and over (from 1942)
X	Tax exempt

== Non-passenger plates ==
The state issues many non-passenger types of license plates to various vehicle classes and types.

Image	Type	First issued	Serial format(s)	Notes
	Amateur Radio		FCC call sign	
	Antique		123 456; BB1 234; IB1 234; FAC D12; JB1 234; 12E PCD; 123 4FB; DB1 234	Issued to cars and trucks that are at least 30 years old and under 26,000 lb (11.7 t); Second letter progression for the JB1 234 format: A, B Second letter progression for the 123 4FB format: G, H Second letter progression for the DB1 234 format: I, J, K DJ4 999 current high.
	Antique Motorcycle		Q123456; 123QB; 123RB; FJC12; 123NB	
	Apportioned		A12 34B; XB1 23C; AB1 2CD	Annual plates. Issued in pairs. Newly issued purple plates in 2025 does not indicate year on the top left. "AB" denotes the type of vehicle. ~~Not to confuse with AB1 2CD in regular passenger series, they never share the first two letters.~~
	City Government		123456; XB1234	"City" legend. XM4999 current high.
	Florida 30A	2027	1 12 123 1234 12345 123456 1234567 12345678 123456789 1234567890	
	City Government — Motorcycle		CY 1234; J12345	"City" legend.
	College		1234; IB12; JB12; KB12	
	County Government		123456; TB1234	"County" legend. TM4999 current high.
	County Government — Motorcycle		C0 1234	"County" legend.
	Custom Vehicle	2008	VBC1D	
	Dealer	2013	MBC 123; MBC 12D; MB1 23C; NB1 23C; PB1 23C	The series skipped to PA0 00A after approximately issuing NC7 18I. PP9 99Z current high ~~Not to confuse with A12 3BC in the regular series~~ ~~Not to confuse with MBC D12 motorcycle plates~~
	Disabled Person	2011	12345; 123456; Y1BCD; Z1BCD; YB12C; ZB12C; JB12C; VB1CD; FZC1D; CT1CD; FBC12; UB1CD	X through Z are used as second letter in the FBC12 serial format. Current high: UP9ZZ
	Disabled Person – Motorcycle		1234; WB1C; XB1C; YB1C; ZB1C; 12AB; A1BC	C, D, X, and Y used as first letter (A) in the 12AB serial format.
	Division of Driver Licenses		DDL12345	
	Electronic Temporary registration		ABC1234	DYM9999 current high
	Exempt		X12345; X1234B	
	Fleet		GBC 123; GB1 234 (If issued by a truck with pairs.)	GGP 999 is the current high, while GB4 999 with truck.
	Florida Department of Agriculture and Consumer Services		ACS12345	
	Florida Department of Corrections		DC 12345	
	Florida Department of Environmental Protection		DEP12345	
	Florida Department of Health		DH 1234	
	Florida Department of Transportation		D0T12345	
	Florida Department of Veterans Affairs		FDVA1234	
	Florida Division of Motor Vehicles		DMV12345	
	Florida Public Service Commission		PSC12345	
	Florida Water Management District		WMD12345	
	Former Military Vehicle		12345HA	Very obscure, it has been said that FL doesn't even want to issue them.
	Former Military Motorcycle		M1B	
	Horseless Carriage		12345	
	Horseless Carriage - DMV		1234; 12345	
	Horseless Carriage - Motorcycle		HC 123A; HC C12	
	Horseless Carriage - Permanent		12; 123; 1234	
	Indefinite — Agricultural Trailer		YB1 23C	
	Indefinite — Rental Trailer		Z 12345; ZB1 23C	
	Labor of Employment Security		LES12345	
	Lease		YBC 12D; ZBC 12D	
	Livestock Hauler		LH 1234	
	Manufacturer		A12 345	A13 899 current high
	Medal of Honor (Air Force)	1985	F12	Given to Medal of Honor recipients who served the Air Force
	Medal of Honor (Army)	1985	A12	Given to Medal of Honor recipients who served the Army
	Medal of Honor (Navy)	1985	N12	Given to Medal of Honor recipients who served the Navy
	Member of Congress		1; 12	Serial is district number.
	Miccosukee Indian		1234	Issued to Miccosukee owners.
	Miccosukee Indian Motorcycle		1234MI	Issued to Miccosukee motorcyclists.
	Motor Scooter—driver under 21 years old		12ABC; 12BBC; 12LBC	Current high: 99LMZ.
	Motorcycle		123456; VB1234; 12345A; 1234AB; MBCD12; SBCD12; 12FICD	The 6 series in the 123456 format are occupied by motorcycle dealers. N through W then A through R except M, reserved for motorcycle dealers, used as first letter in the 12345A format. E, although the first six letters of the second, K, L, N, and R used as first letter (A) in the 1234AB serial format. MBCD12 and SBCD12 format began in 2016 and 2024 respectively. The 12FICD format began in 2025 nearing the end of the SD series. Current high: 99FIFZ.
	Motorcycle Dealer		623456; 12345M	
	North Broward Hospital District		NBHD1234	
	Permanent Trailer		C12 34B; 123 4CB; QB1 2CD	Permanent plates. ~~Not to confuse with regular plates CB1 234~~ QB9 9VZ is the current high
	Reg Only		AB12345	
	Reg Only — Motorcycle		12345X	
	Restricted		U12 34B; MBC 12D	~~Not to confuse with MBC D12 motorcycle plates~~
	Seminole Indian		1234; IB1C	Issued to Seminole owners.
	Seminole Indian Motorcycle		1234SI	Issued to Seminole motorcyclists.
	Sheriff		12345; ZBC12	ZZX99 current high
	State Fire Marshall		1FBC	
	State Government		12345; YB123; ZB123	
	State Government — Motorcycle		ST 1234	
	State police		1234	
	Street Rod	1983	Z1234	
	Temporary registration		A-123456; AB-12345	
	Truck over 5,000 lb (2.26 t)	1986	AA0000 - DK9999; H00 00A - P19 99L	County name or "SUNSHINE STATE" slogan at bottom. Issued in pairs with the validation sticker placed on the front plate. ~~I..V to I..Z series are passenger plates, not to be confused.~~
	Transporter		G12 34B	
	Workforce Innovation		AWI12345	
	Wrecker		D12 34B	"WRECKER" legend.
	Wrecker — Weighted		E1234B; BJ12CD	"WRECKER" legend. A through E are issued as second letter in the E1234B serial format. ~~E..F to E..M series are passenger plates, not to be confused.~~

== Personalized plates ==
Florida offers personalized license plates for an extra fee, on the standard orange blossom design and on specialty designs (below). On the orange blossom design and specialty designs with centered graphics, combinations can consist of between one and seven characters specified by the registrant, including letters, numbers, spaces and hyphens. On specialty designs with left-aligned graphics, combinations are limited to a maximum of five characters, and on the Motorcycle Specialty plate, they are limited to a maximum of six characters.

== Specialty plates ==
Florida has offered over 120 specialty license plates to its motorists, most for an extra fee. Some of these plates are no longer issued, while others have been redesigned since they were first issued.

=== Collegiate ===
Image	Type	First issued (redesigned)	Serial format(s)	Notes
	AdventHealth University (Florida Hospital College of Health Sciences prior to 2012)	October 1, 2002 (November 1, 2021)	H12 345; CAC12	
	Auburn University	December 18, 2023	123AB	Series stated at 001AR.
	Ave Maria University	November 1, 2021	CBC12	
	Barry University	July 1, 1998 (November 1, 2021)	AA123; AB12C; CCC12; EEC12; C1BCD	
	Beacon College	November 1, 2021	CDC12	
	Bethune–Cookman University (Bethune–Cookman College prior to 2007)	February 15, 1997	BC123; BB12C; BB1CD	
	Eckerd College	October 1, 2002 (November 1, 2021)	E12 345; CEC12	
	Edward Waters College	October 1, 2002 (January 7, 2022)	B1BC; MB12; AB12C	
	Embry–Riddle Aeronautical University	October 1, 2002 (November 1, 2021)	K1BC; Y1BC; CFC12; EDC12	
	Everglades University	November 1, 2021	CGC12	
	Flagler College	October 1, 2002 (December 28, 2018, July 27, 2022)	C1BC; Z1BC; FGC1D	
	Florida A&M University	October 1, 1987 (July 30, 2025)	M1234; M123B; M12BC; Y12BC; M1BCD	
	Florida Atlantic University	October 1, 1987 (February 19, 2025)	A1234; A123B	
	Florida College	October 1, 2002 (November 1, 2021)	L1BC; CHC12	
	Florida Gulf Coast University	November 1, 1997 (September 27, 2021)	V1234; V123B; V12BC	
	Florida Institute of Technology	October 1, 2002 (November 1, 2021)	Q1BC; CIC12	
	Florida International University	October 1, 1987 (February 19, 2025)	I1234; I123B; I12BC	
	Florida Memorial University	July 1, 1999 (March 27, 2023)	FBC1D; 12QAC	
	Florida Southern College	October 1, 2002 (November 1, 2021)	D1BC; CJC12; KA1CD	
	Florida State University	October 1, 1987	S1234; S123B; S12BC; S1BCD; ABC1D; 1234S; SB123; VB123; WB123; WB12C; UB12C; AM12C; FLC1D; J1KCD; T1BCD	
	Jacksonville University	October 1, 2002 (October 28, 2019, November 1, 2021)	R1BC; 12JB; 12KB; CLC12	
	Keiser University	2015 (November 1, 2021)	123NB; CZC12	
	Lynn University	October 1, 2002 (November 1, 2021)	E1BC; CMC12	
	New College of Florida	July 1, 2002 - March 28, 2022; April 14, 2025 - Present	N123; N12B; N1BC; E123; 1BBC	
	Nova Southeastern University	October 1, 2002 (November 1, 2021)	S1BC; SB12; S12B; 12UB; CNC12	
	Palm Beach Atlantic University	October 1, 2002 (November 1, 2021)	F1BC; CPC12	
	Ringling School of Art and Design	October 1, 2002 (November 1, 2021)	U1BC; CQC12	
	Rollins College	October 1, 2002 (November 1, 2021)	G1BC; RB12; CRC12	
	Saint Leo University	October 1, 2002 (November 1, 2021)	V1BC; CSC12	
	Saint Thomas University	October 1, 2002 (November 1, 2021)	H1BC; CTC12	
	Southeastern University	October 1, 2002 (November 1, 2021)	W1BC; WB12; CUC12	
	Stetson University	October 1, 2002 (November 1, 2021)	I1BC; ZB12; CVC12	
	University of Alabama	July 17, 2024	UA1CD; W1WCD	
	University of Central Florida	October 1, 1987 (July 26, 2016)	C1234; C123B; C12BC; 123YB; J12LC; P12BC	
	University of Florida	October 1, 1987 (1997, 2007, December 13, 2022)	F1234; F123B; F12BC; F1BCD; GBC1D; HBC1D; IBC1D	
	University of Georgia	March 27, 2023	UG1CD; U1GCD; BUC12	
	University of North Florida	October 1, 1987 – February 1, 2024; July 30, 2025 –Present	N1234; N123B; N12BC	
	University of Miami	October 1989	H1234; H123B; H12BC; HBC1D; X12BC; EFC12; JBC12; FD1CD; 123NH; 123XA; 12HNC; UM1CD; Z12WC	
	University of South Florida	October 1, 1987 (July 30, 2018)	U1234; U123B; U12BC; ZBC1D	
	University of Tampa	October 1, 2002 (August 15, 2016, November 1, 2021)	X1BC; TB12; UB12; VB12; XB12; CWC12	
	University of West Florida	October 1, 1987 (2015)	W1234; W123B; W12BC	
	Warner University (Warner Southern College prior to 2008)	October 1, 2002 (November 1, 2021)	J1BC; CXC12	
	Webber International University	November 1, 2021	CYC12	

=== Environmental/Wildlife ===
Image	Type	First issued (redesigned)	Serial format(s)	Notes
	Animal Friend	July 1, 2004 (September 26, 2016)	ABC12; BBC12	
	Aquaculture	July 1, 2004	AB1 234	
	Bonefish & Tarpon Trust	August 28, 2023	123XB	
	Conserve Wildlife	July 1, 1998	CA123; CB12C; CB1CD	
	Conserve Florida Fisheries	2021	12C ACD	
	Discover Florida's Horses	January 10, 2010	12DBC	
	Discover Florida's Oceans	July 1, 2004	DBC12	
	Ducks Unlimited	March 27, 2023	EBC12	
	Endless Summer	2010	12EBC; 12JBC; 12KBC; PB1CD; 123CB; EBC12; FBC12; C1BCD; JKC12; FB1CD	
	Everglades River of Grass	July 1, 1998	EA123; EB12C	
	Explore Off-Road	May 26, 2022	JBC1D	
	Fish Florida	October 1, 2003	JB1CD	
	Florida Bay Forever	April 8, 2024	123CB; FB123; FRC12	
	Go Fishing	March 15, 1997	LA123; LB12C; LB1CD	
	Helping Sea Turtles Survive	February 1, 1998	RBC 123	
	Indian River Lagoon	February 15, 1995; April 24, 2023	R1234; R123B; R12BC; R1BCD	
	Protect Biscayne Bay	June 23, 2025	CZ1CD	
	Protect Florida Springs	October 1, 2007	P12 345	
	Protect Florida Whales	July 1, 2002	WBC1D	
	Protect Marine Wildlife	March 27, 2023	EBC12; LAC12; FA1CD; CS1CD	
	Protect Our Oceans	October 1, 2010	12GBC; FB123; FBC12; CU1CD	The "Protect Our Oceans" plate, introduced in the spring of 2015, is a re-design of the original "Catch Me, Release Me" plate.
	Protect Our Reefs	July 1, 2003	RBC1D	
	Protect the Panther	October 15, 1990	LBC 123; MBC 123	Original design: white plate with panther in center (serials LAA 001 through LEE 999). Current design: white and orange gradient plate with panther's head in center and grass at bottom (serials LEF 001 and up).
	Protect the Panther	1993	LBC 123; MBC 123	Original design: white plate with panther in center (serials LAA 001 through LEE 999). Current design: white and orange gradient plate with panther's head in center and grass at bottom (serials LEF 001 and up).
	Protect the Panther	November 27, 2023	X1BCD	Original design: white plate with panther in center (serials LAA 001 through LEE 999). Current design: white and orange gradient plate with panther's head in center and grass at bottom (serials LEF 001 and up).
	Protect the Gopher Tortoise	April 14, 2025	CV1CD	
	Protect Wild Dolphins	July 1, 1998	DA123; DB12C; DB1CD; DBC1D; XB12C	
	Save Our Seas	July 1, 2004	QBC12; RBC12; SBC12; QBC1D	
	Save the Bees	October 29, 2025	FS1 2CD	
	Save the Manatee	March 16, 1990	HBC 123; IBC 123	Original design: red serial on white, blue and green plate with manatee in center (serials HAA 001 through IBX 999). Current design: black serial on yellow, green and blue plate with manatee in center (serials IBY 001 and up).
	Save the Manatee	2008	HBC 123; IBC 123	Original design: red serial on white, blue and green plate with manatee in center (serials HAA 001 through IBX 999). Current design: black serial on yellow, green and blue plate with manatee in center (serials IBY 001 and up).
	Save Wild Florida		12FBC	Features a Miami blue butterfly at left.
	Sportsmen's National Land Trust / Wildlife Foundation of Florida	July 1, 2004 (2014)	VBC12; WBC12	Both designs feature a white-tailed deer at left.
	State Parks	2022	BI1 2CD	
	State Wildflower	July 1, 1999	WBC 123	
	Tampa Bay Estuary	June 10, 1999	TBC1D	
	Trees Are Cool	October 1, 2007 (December 22, 2025)	12CBC	

=== Special Interest ===
Image	Type	First issued (redesigned)	Serial format(s)	Notes
	Agricultural Education	July 1, 2006	JB123; JBC1D	
	Agriculture	April 1, 1997	VBC 123	
	Alpha Kappa Alpha	May 26, 2022	123 4AB	
	Alpha Phi Alpha	May 26, 2022	123 4AC	
	America the Beautiful	May 26, 2022	AB12C	
	Big Brothers, Big Sisters	2013 (2019)	123EB	
	Challenger/Columbia	January 1, 1987 (2001, 2005)	KSC 123; ABC 123; BBC 123; TB123; TA12C; TB1CD	The first issuance of a speciality plate, commemorating their astronauts following Space Shuttle Challenger disaster in 1986. In 2005, due to Space Shuttle Columbia disaster that arose in 2003, Florida redesigned by inserting “Columbia” on their plate.
	Choose Life	July 1,1999 (2022)	CBC1D	
	Delta Sigma Theta	May 26, 2022	123 4AD	
	Disease Prevention & Early Detection	February 23, 2026		
	Don't Tread on Me	December 13, 2022	GBC12; JLC12; J12KC; KB1CD; Y123B; FB123	
	End Breast Cancer	July 1,1998 (2022)	KBC1D	
	Family First	July 1,2004 (2022)	FB1 234	
	Family Values	July 1, 2004 (October 2, 2023)	VB1 234	
	Florida Sheriffs Association	2014	FB12C	
	Florida Stands with Israel	January 30, 2025	UB1CD	
	Fraternal Order of Police	2010	123FB	
	Freemasonry	2013	123KB	
	Honoring Law Enforcement	2014	123LB; CP1CD	
	Horse Country	August 1,2008 (2022)	12HBC	
	Hospice – Every Day Is a Gift	July 1,2003 (2022)	123HB; 123IB	
	Imagine	July 1,2004 (2022)	123 4FB	
	In God We Trust	October 1, 2008	IBC12	
	Invest in Children	June 1,1995 (2022)	123 CBC; 123 DBC	The series skipped to 001 DJJ after approximately issuing 370 CCJ.
	Iota Phi Theta	May 26, 2022	123 4AE	
	K9s United	January 30, 2025	GBC12	
	Kappa Alpha Psi	May 26, 2022	123 4AF	
	Lauren's Kids	July 1,2014 (2022)	123GB	
	Margaritaville	July 30, 2025	JBC12	
	Live the Dream	July 1,2004 (2022)	DB1 234	
	Moffitt Cancer Center	2015	123PB	
	Omega Psi Phi	May 26, 2022	123 4AG	
	Phi Beta Sigma	May 26, 2022	123 4AH	
	Salutes Firefighters	July 1,2002 (2022)	YB1CD	
	Sigma Gamma Rho	May 26,2022	123 4AI	
This plate says "Florida" on the top, "State of the Arts" at the bottom, and incorporates a colored design that is teal on the top, blue on the bottom, and red in the middle.	State of the Arts	February 1,1995 (2022)	FBC 123	
	Stop Child Abuse	July 1,2003 (2022)	123SB; 123TB	
	Stop Heart Disease	July 1,2003	S12 345	
	Support Autism Programs	September 1,2009 (2022)	12SBC	
	Support Education	October 1, 1994 (December 13, 2018)	123 ABC; MBC12	
	Support Homeownership for All	July 1, 2006 (March 25, 2024)	QB123; FQC12	
	Support Law Enforcement	October 1, 2002 (September 15, 2020)	PBC1D	
	United We Stand	September 1,2002 (2022)	123 UBC	
	Visit Our Lights	October 1, 2008 (July 29, 2019)	VB12C	
	Walt Disney World	August 26,2021	12DBC; EBC1D	
	Zeta Phi Beta	May 26, 2022	123 4AJ	

=== Sports ===
Image	Type	First issued (redesigned)	Serial format(s)	Notes
	Florida Panthers	June 1, 1995 (June 28, 2017, April 24, 2023)	P1234; P123B; PA1 234; 12PBC; 12RNC; FBC12; LHC12	
	Golf Capital of the World	July 1, 2002	JB1 23C	
	Inter Miami CF	August 28, 2025	JBC12	
	Jacksonville Jaguars	June 1,1995 July 23,2010 September 14,2023	J1234; J123B; J12BC; J1BCD	
	Miami Dolphins	April 1, 1995 (2015, October 28, 2019)	D1234; D123B; D12BC; D1BCD	
	Miami Heat	June 1, 1995 (November 13, 2018, December 3, 2021, October 2, 2023)	L1234; L123B; L12BC; L1BCD; LBC12; CW1CD; Y123B	
	Miami Marlins (Florida Marlins prior to 2012)	July 1, 1995 (April 29, 2019)	E1234; E123B; E12BC	
	NASCAR	October 1, 2007 (2015)	12NBC	
	Olympic Spirit	January 1,1994 July 23,2012 August 10,2023	G1234; G123B; G12BC; G1BCD	
	Orlando City SC	March 14, 2023	123 SEC	
	Orlando Magic	June 1, 1995 (August 28, 2025)	K1234; K123B; K12BC	
	Play Tennis	October 1, 2008	123BB	
	Police Athletic League	February 15,1997 (2009)	PA123; PB12C; PB1CD	
	Share the Road	June 10,1999 (2010)	123 EBC; EBC1D	
	Swim For Life	January 8, 2025	12F HCD	
	Tampa Bay Buccaneers	April 1, 1998 (2008, 2015, August 12, 2021, June 20, 2025)	B1234; B123B; B12BC; B1BCD	
	Tampa Bay Lightning	June 1, 1995 (August 26, 2019)	T1234; T123B; T12BC	
	Tampa Bay Rays (Tampa Bay Devil Rays prior to 2008)	March 1, 1997 (2008)	Q1234; Q123B; Q12BC	

=== Military ===
Image	Type	First issued (redesigned)	Serial format(s)	Notes
	American Legion	2013	123DB	
	Blue Angels	2021	A1BCD; BB123; CY1CD	
	Blue Angels — Motorcycle	2021	123A; F123; 12BB	
	Salutes Veterans	1999	SBC1D	
	Support Our Troops	October 1, 2007	12TBC	
	U.S. Air Force	July 1, 2003	ABC1D	
	U.S. Army	July 1, 2003	BBC1D	
	U.S. Coast Guard	July 1, 2003	123VB; 12IBC	
	U.S. Marine Corps	July 1, 1999	UBC1D; QBC1D	
	U.S. Navy	July 1, 2003	NBC1D	

=== Special military ===
Image	Type	First issued (redesigned)	Serial format(s)	Notes
	Air Force Combat Action Medal	April 25, 2016	Y1234	
	Air Force Cross			
	Army of Occupation	May 26, 2022	AN12C	
	Bronze Star	August 9, 2021	BB123	
	Combat Action Badge		1TBC	
	Combat Action Ribbon		123UB	
	Combat Infantry Badge		1HBC; 1IBC	
	Combat Medical Badge		X123B	
	Disabled Veteran (Disabled)		1234; ABC1; 12345	
	Disabled Veteran		DV12345; DV1234C; DV1234; DV12CD; 12345DV	
	Disabled Veteran — Motorcycle		DV1234; 1234DB	Progression of second letter: V, A, B.
	Distinguished Flying Cross			
	Distinguished Service Cross			
	Ex-Prisoner of War	1983	EX-POW 123; EX-POW 1234; EX-POW PBC1	Orange blossom design.
	Gold Star family	April 1, 2008	1GBC	
	Korean War Veteran		1QBC	
	National Guard		1234; A12B	
	Navy Cross			
	Navy Submariner	April 25, 2016	VB1C; UB1C	
	Operation Desert Shield		1YBC	
	Operation Desert Storm		1VBC; 1WBC	
	Operation Enduring Freedom	2006	JB1C; KB1C; LB1C	
	Operation Iraqi Freedom	2010 (2014)	AB1C; BB1C; CB1C; DB1C	Double orange base pictured was replaced in 2014 by updated design.
	Paralyzed Veterans of America	1987	A12B	
	Pearl Harbor survivor	1983	1234	Orange blossom design.
	Purple Heart recipient		12345; QB1CD	
	Purple Heart — Motorcycle	2021	1PBC; E1BC	
	Silver Star			
	U.S. paratrooper	July 1, 2003	123WB; ENC1D	
	U.S. Reserve	1983	1234; UB123	
	Veteran		Z123B; XB1CD	
	Veteran (Motorcycle)	2021	XBC1D	
	Vietnam War Veteran		1LBC; 1MBC; 1NBC; 1ZBC	
	Woman Veteran	2016	X1234; EGC12	
	Woman Veteran — Motorcycle	2021	YBC1D	
	World War II Veteran	April 25, 2016		

=== Other ===
Image	Type	First issued	Serial format	Notes
	Motorcycle Specialty	October 1, 2003	Y12345	Red, white and blue design.

=== Discontinued ===
Image	Type	Dates issued	Serial format(s)	Serials issued	Notes
	A State of Vision	July 1, 2006 – November 1, 2024	XB123	XA001 to XR513	
	American Red Cross	July 1, 2002 – March 2016	123AB	001AA to 866AE	
	Best Buddies	July 26, 2023 – February 17, 2025	12PBC; FB1CD	01PAA to 99PBZ; FB0AA to FB9ZZ	
	Clearwater Christian College	October 1, 2002 – September 2015	A1BC	A0AA to approximately A9JZ	Discontinued following the college's closure.
	Collectible	1996 - 1999	123456		Discontinued due to abuse of the reduced rate.
	Columbus Jubilee	1991 – January 1, 1994	PBC 123	PAA 001 to approximately PAJ 599	
	Corrections Foundation	October 1, 2007 – 2009	1CBC; 1DBC	1CAA to approximately 9DTZ	
	Donate Organs	July 1, 2006 – 2016	Y123B	Y001A to Y720L	
	Florida Sheriffs Youth Ranches	July 1, 1998 – November 1, 2024	RA123; RB12C	RA001 to RA999; RA00A to RN87Y	
	Girl Scouts	1996 – February 20, 2002	GA123; GB12C	GA001 to GA999; GA01A to GE13F	
	Hispanic Achievers	2010 – July 1, 2016	123 4AA	000 1AA to 649 3AA	
	Hodges University	November 1, 2021 – March 1, 2024	CKC12	CKA01 to approximately CKS55	
	Honorary Consul	1989 – 2022	1; 123; AB1		
	Keep Kids Drug Free	July 1, 1998 – November 1, 2024	KA123; KB12C	KA001 to KA999; KA01A to KR94E	
	Kids Deserve Justice	July 1, 2004 – February 15, 2023	KBC12	KAA01 to KIV13	
	Miami Hooters	1995 – December 1997	M123; M12B	M001 to M999; M01A to approximately M81P	
	Orlando Predators	1995 – December 1997	P123; P12B; P1BC	P001 to P999; P01A to P99Z; P0AA to approximately P6IS	
	Parents Make a Difference	July 1, 2004 – February 3, 2020	PBC12	PAA01 to PHI89	
	Salutes Veterans	October 10, 1989 - 1999	DBC 123	DAA 001 to DEH 550	Replaced with the redesigned version.
	Scouting Teaches Values	February 15, 1997 – November 1, 2024	123 SBC	001 SAA to 954 SBE	
	Special Olympics	January 1, 1994 – November 1, 2024	SBC 123	SAA 001 to SCG 357	
	St. Johns River	2010 – July 1, 2016	12RBC	01RAA to 32RDG	
	Super Bowl	October 1, 1989 – January 1, 1994	TBC 123	TMM 001 to approximately TPT 454	
	Support Soccer	July 1, 2004 – 2018	123 4SB	000 1SA to 176 6SC	Discontinued following the closure of Lighthouse Soccer Foundation Inc.
	Support Scenic Walton	November 13, 2023 – February 6, 2026	FC1CD	FC0AA to FC8ZY	
	Tampa Bay Storm	1995 – February 20, 2002	T123; T12B	T001 to T999; T00A to approximately T99T	
