= Michelle Cook (sheriff) =

American sheriff in Florida

- Official portrait of Sheriff Cook

Sheriff of Clay County, Florida
- Incumbent
- Assumed office September 1, 2020
- Preceded by: Matt Walsh (interim)

Personal details
- Born: Michelle Cook Green Cove Springs, Florida, U.S.
- Party: Republican
- Education: University of North Florida (B.A., M.S.)
- Occupation: Law enforcement officer

Michelle Cook is an American law enforcement officer serving as Sheriff of Clay County, Florida since September 2020. She is the first woman to hold the office in the county's history and, as of 2026, is one of two women serving as sheriff in Florida, alongside Miami-Dade County Sheriff Rosie Cordero-Stutz. She was elected in 2020 after defeating incumbent Darryl Daniels, who had been suspended from office by Governor Ron DeSantis following his arrest, and was reelected in 2024 with about 80 percent of the vote.

== Early life and education ==
Cook is a native of Green Cove Springs, Florida, in Clay County, and a graduate of Clay High School. She holds a bachelor's degree in criminal justice with a minor in public administration, and a master's degree in criminal justice, both from the University of North Florida, and is a graduate of the FBI-LEEDA Command Leadership Institute.

== Law enforcement career ==
Cook joined the Jacksonville Sheriff's Office in 1992. In 2016, she was promoted to head the agency's Department of Patrol and Enforcement. She retired from the agency as director of patrol and enforcement in 2017, and became chief of the Atlantic Beach Police Department in 2017.

== 2020 sheriff election ==
Cook left the Atlantic Beach Police Department in early 2020 to run for Sheriff of Clay County. The incumbent, Darryl Daniels, was arrested on August 13, 2020, and charged with tampering with evidence and giving false reports to law enforcement, charges that stemmed from an investigation into his relationship with a subordinate. Governor DeSantis suspended him the next day and appointed Florida Department of Law Enforcement agent Matt Walsh as interim sheriff. Cook won the August 18, 2020, Republican primary, with Daniels finishing second with 29 percent of the vote. A write-in candidate withdrew from the general election race, leaving Cook as the next sheriff. DeSantis asked Cook to take office ahead of the normal January inauguration date, and she was sworn in as Sheriff of Clay County on September 1, 2020, becoming the first woman to hold the office.

== Tenure as sheriff ==
In March 2021, the National Sheriffs' Association recognized Cook, at the time the only woman serving as sheriff in Florida, for Women's History Month. In 2023, she helped launch the Signal 35 Fund, a nonprofit that provides emergency financial assistance to first responders in Clay County. Cook and the Clay County Sheriff's Office are also founding partners of the Northeast Florida Inter-Agency Child Exploitation and Persons Trafficking (INTERCEPT) Task Force, a multi-agency initiative combating human trafficking and child exploitation.

Clay Today reported that crime rates in the county fell even as its population grew. In 2025, her office announced a collaboration with the state to help solve cold cases.

In March 2026, Cook was recognized by President Donald Trump during a Women's History Month event at the White House.

== 2024 re-election ==
Cook filed for re-election in May 2023 and ran unopposed in the Republican primary. In the November 2024 general election, she again faced Daniels, who had been acquitted of all charges in 2022, and won with around 80 percent of the vote.

== Boards and affiliations ==
Cook serves as the District 2 representative on the Florida Sheriffs Association's board of directors, and chairs its Cold Case Advisory Commission. She also sits on the association's Legislative and Research committees. Other affiliations include the Florida Department of Law Enforcement's Regional Domestic Security Task Force, the Northeast Florida High-Intensity Drug Trafficking Area executive board, and the Florida Commission for Law Enforcement Accreditation, where she serves as a commissioner.
