= Sarasota County Sheriff's Office =

County law enforcement agency in Florida, U.S.

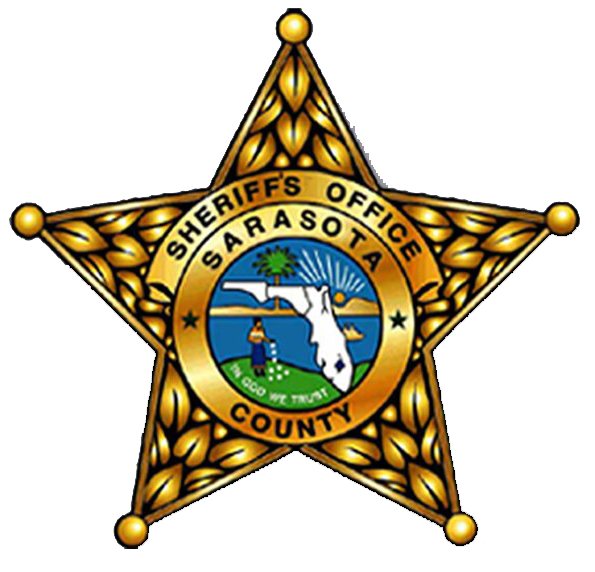
- Logo and badge of the Sarasota Sheriff's Office.
- Common name: Sarasota Sheriff's Office
- Abbreviation: SCSO

Agency overview
- Formed: May 14, 1921
- Annual budget: $111,343,435 (2018)

Jurisdictional structure
- Operations jurisdiction: Sarasota, Florida, US
- Map of Sarasota County Sheriff's Office's jurisdiction
- General nature: Local civilian police

Operational structure
- Headquarters: Sarasota, Florida
- Agency executive: Kurt A. Hoffman, Sheriff

Facilities
- Helicopters: 2

Website
- Sarasota County Sheriff's Office

Sarasota County Sheriff's Office (SCSO) is the primary law enforcement agency for Sarasota County, Florida. The agency is responsible for law enforcement services in unincorporated areas of Sarasota County, jail facilities, and courthouse security for Florida's 12th Judicial Circuit. SSO also operates Public Safety Communications (PSC), the county's primary 911 center.

== History ==
=== Founding ===
The sheriff's office was established in 1921 under the separation of Sarasota County from the southern portion of Manatee County. Florida Governor Cary A. Hardee appointed Burna Dale "Heinie" Levi as the first sheriff of Sarasota County that year on July 1, 1921. On August 22, 1921, Sarasota city marshal L.D. Hodges became the agency's first deputy. Hodges was elected as sheriff in 1922 as Levi decided not to run in the general election that year. He would begin his tenure in December 1922.

In 1926, a sheriff's deputy was arrested on charges of having assaulted an African-American man named Robert Walthau with his gun and baton on October 23, 1926. The deputy said he had asked Walthau if he was working, and offered him a job unloading some trucks. Walthau allegedly said that this was none of his business to which deputy allegedly responded by saying that Walthau should treat him with more respect because he was white. Mayor Bacon of Sarasota had no comment when asked by a reporter from the Sarasota Herald, but Sheriff Hodges responded by saying that an investigation would be done and that he would suspend the deputy if necessary. Between October 18 and October 23, 1926 the Bob Morton Circus helped the Ku Klux Klan hold an event in Sarasota, and it is possible that the deputy was encouraged by this.

Sheriff Hodges lost in the Democratic primary on June 5, 1928, to W. Albert Keen. Keen began his tenure on January 8, 1929. Three months into his tenure he was shot along with Special Deputy Walter Whitted while doing a gambling raid in Laurel. Both of them went to Sarasota Memorial Hospital and Keen ended up having his right leg amputated.

Hodges resumes his duties as sheriff in June 1929 and continued to serve until he lost a run-off election to Clem Pearson, a former Sarasota Police Department officer. Pearson was sworn in on January 3, 1933.

Pearson served until retiring in May 1939 for health reasons. His son, B. Douglas "Doug" Pearson, who had previously been a deputy for one year, took over. Doug Pearson continued to serve for another 13 years before leaving office in January 1953, when he was defeated by Ross Boyer. Boyer had previously served with the Florida Highway Patrol and had run unsuccessfully for sheriff in 1948. During Boyer's time in office, he dramatically expanded and modernized the Sheriff's Department. He also helped with creating the Florida Boys Ranch in 1958 and became the president of the National Sheriffs Association in 1969. Boyer won reelection election four times as a Democrat, despite Sarasota County becoming strongly Republican. He retired in 1972 for health related reasons.

== List of Sheriffs ==
- Burna D. Levi (July 1, 1921 – December 1922)
- L.D. Hodges (December 1922 – January 8, 1929)
- W. Albert Keen (January 8, 1929 – January 3, 1933)
- Clem Pearson (January 3, 1933 – May 1939)
- B. Douglas "Doug" Pearson (May 1939 – June 1953)
- Ross E. Boyer (January 6, 1953 – January 1973)
- Jim Hardcastle (January 2, 1973 – January 8, 1985)
- Geoffrey Monge (January 8, 1985 – January 2001)
- William Balkwil (January 2001 – January 9, 2009)
- Thomas M. Knight (January 9, 2009 – January 9, 2021)
- Kurt A. Hoffman (January 9, 2021 – Present)

== Divisions ==
=== Law enforcement ===
==== Patrol bureau ====
Deputies in the patrol bureau provide round-the-clock patrol services and answers calls for service in their jurisdiction, which is unincorporated Sarasota County.

==== Special Operations bureau ====
The Special Operations division assists the patrol bureau in providing specialized law enforcement services to the county. Divisions within this bureau include:

- Agricultural Unit
- Animal Services Unit
- Aviation Unit
- Emergency Response Team (ERT)
- Fugitive Apprehension Unit
- Hazardous Devices Unit
- K-9 Unit
- Marine Unit
- Mounted Patrol Unit
- Sheriff's Underwater Recovery Force (SURF)
- Special Weapons and Tactics (SWAT) Unit
- Traffic Unit
- Youth Services

==== Investigative bureau ====
The Investigate Bureau employs detectives along with civilian crime analysts. Divisions within the bureau include:

- Criminal Investigations Section
- Drug Laboratory
- Forensics
- Intelligence and Homeland Defense
- Special Investigations Section
- Special Victims Unit

==== Specialized units ====
Deputies may also be assigned to specialized units in addition to their regular duties. These units include:

- Bomb Unit
- Crisis Negotiation Team
- Emergency Response Team
- Mounted Patrol
- Sheriff's Underwater Recovery Force (SURF)
- SWAT Unit

=== Courts ===
The agency is responsible for providing court security for all Courthouses and Courtrooms in Sarasota County.

There are two courts in Sarasota County - a courthouse in Venice, as well as the main courthouse in downtown Sarasota. Bailiffs also provided security at the Clerk of Courts building as well as at the Sheriff's Office main headquarters at 2071 Ringling Blvd.

There are several units in the Bailiffs section, to include Security (for the building), Transport and Courtroom security.

=== Corrections ===
The agency is responsible for staffing and maintaining the Sarasota County Jail.

Corrections Deputies are charged with the care, custody & control of inmates in the County facility.

The current jail is located in downtown Sarasota and consists of three interconnected jails. The current inmate census is about 950 inmates.

=== 911 Center ===
The Sheriff's Office operates Public Safety Communications (PSC), the county's primary 911 center. In addition to dispatching for the Sheriff's Office, it provides law enforcement dispatch to the Sarasota and Venice Police Departments and fire/medical dispatch for the Sarasota County Fire Department, Nokomis Fire Department, Venice Fire Department, North Port Fire Department, and Englewood Fire Department.

== Ranks ==
Title	Insignia
Sheriff	
Colonel	
Major	
Captain	
Lieutenant	
Sergeant	
Deputy	

== Vehicle fleet ==
As of October 2014, the agency was using police vehicles manufactured by General Motors' Chevrolet brand. The department's patrol fleet primarily consisted of the Chevrolet Impala, Chevrolet Caprice PPV, and Chevrolet Tahoe. As of January 2022, the fleet included undercover cars ranging from Ford Mustang, Toyota Camry, Chevrolet Silverado, Ford F-150 & F-250.

== Lawsuits ==
The sheriff's office has been the subject of numerous lawsuits from both civilians and employees. A 2014 civil rights lawsuit, in the June 2012 police shooting death of Rodney Mitchell, alleged that Sheriff Knight's law enforcement policies were unconstitutional.

=== Employee retaliation suits ===
Sergeant Chris Iorio sued the sheriff's office in 2013, claiming that Sheriff Knight retaliated against him for reporting Captain Ron Locke to the Florida Department of Law Enforcement after hearing reports that Locke may have molested an underage girl during the mid-1990s. No charges were filed against Locke.

Captain Richard Mottola, who supervised Iorio, filed a lawsuit in 2014 alleging that Sheriff Knight retaliated against Mottola for failing to punish Iorio.
