= Teen Driver Challenge =

- Founded: 2007
- Type: Educational Program
- Location: Florida
- Origins: Tallahassee, FL
- Website: fsateendriverchallenge.com

The Teen Driver Challenge (TDC) sponsored by the Florida Sheriffs Association (FSA) is a 12-hour course presented to students over a two-day period, ideally with a 5-to-1 student-to-instructor ratio. The course will provide students with the knowledge and hands-on experience to reduce their chances of being involved in a crash. Attendance and participation in this training will provide students with life saving skills, techniques and education about the operation of a motor vehicle. The hours spent participating in the Teen Driver Challenge can be used toward fulfilling the requirements set forth in Florida's Graduated Driver's License program.

== History ==
The FSA Teen Driver Challenge was developed at the request of Florida Sheriffs to combat the high crash and fatality rate of Teen Drivers on Florida highways. After a pilot program was successfully conducted in 2006 by the Leon County Sheriff's Office at the request of the FSA, the FSA Board of Directors adopted the concept in 2007. FSA then organized a team of Law Enforcement driving experts who were certified as Instructors by the Florida Department of Law Enforcement in emergency vehicle operation. Today there are 35 counties with an active TDC program:

- Alachua, Bradford, Brevard, Citrus, Clay, Collier, Desoto, Dixie, Duval, Escambia, Franklin, Gadsden, Glades, Gulf, Hamilton, Hernando, Hillsborough, Highlands, Lake, Lee, Leon, Manatee, Marion, Osceola, Pasco, Pinellas, Polk, Santa Rosa, Sarasota, Seminole, St. Lucie, Sumter, Taylor, Volusia, Wakulla, Walton

More counties will join soon.

== Course overview ==
The program is designed for students ages 15 to 19 who have a valid license or learners permit. The course is held over two days and consists of two parts, an educational classroom and hands on driving instruction. The course if offered to students at no cost through their local Sherriff's office. The objectives of the course are to:

- Reduce the number of crashes for drivers who take this class
- Reduce the number of fatal crashes for drivers who take this class
- Reduce the number of DUI arrest and aggressive driving citations for drivers who take this class

== Course description ==
The four-hour classroom portion will cover a workbook that deals with crash-related issues, such as vehicle dynamics, braking, steering and traffic laws. Other chapters include issues like aggressive driving, distracted driving (texting, cell phone use, etc.), DUI and seatbelt issues.

Students will participate in eight hours of behind the well driving instruction, which counts toward the 50 hours of required driving in Florida's Graduated Driver's License Program. The hands-on driving instruction, usually held at a Law Enforcement driving range, will put the students behind the wheel of their own vehicle and go through as assortment of exercises including:

- Figure 8
- Backing
- Cornering
- Skid control
- Off-road recovery
- Forward serpentine
- Reverse serpentine
- Evasive maneuvers
- Threshold/Emergency Braking

At the completion of the program students will be presented a Certificate of Completion that may presented to your auto insurance company for a possible premium reduction.

== Instructors ==
The FSA TDC is licensed statewide by the Florida Department HSMV as a Commercial Driving School, license #3975. Each Law Enforcement Instructor who teaches the program is also licensed, under the FSA License, as a school Instructor. Each new Instructor goes through a rigorous "Train the Trainer" class with an original team member, or sits through an actual program under an established program's Instructor. The original team members are responsible for TDC Instructor training in various areas throughout the state.

== Funding ==
The FSA TDC was initially funded by the FSA followed by a grant from the Florida Department of Transportation Traffic Safety Office, which is reduced by 25% each year of renewal. Funding has been used to buy three vehicles, including two skid pad vehicles and a SUV used by the Program Coordinator to support the Sheriffs' Office programs and to help promote the program at public gatherings.
