= Florida Department of Highway Safety and Motor Vehicles =

Automobile agency in Florida, US

Florida Department of Highway Safety and Motor Vehicles (FLHSMV)
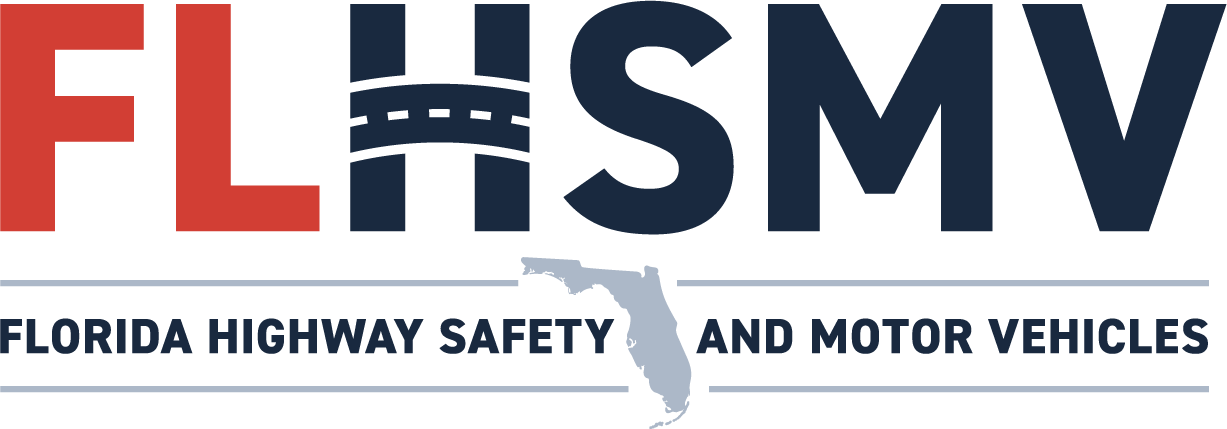

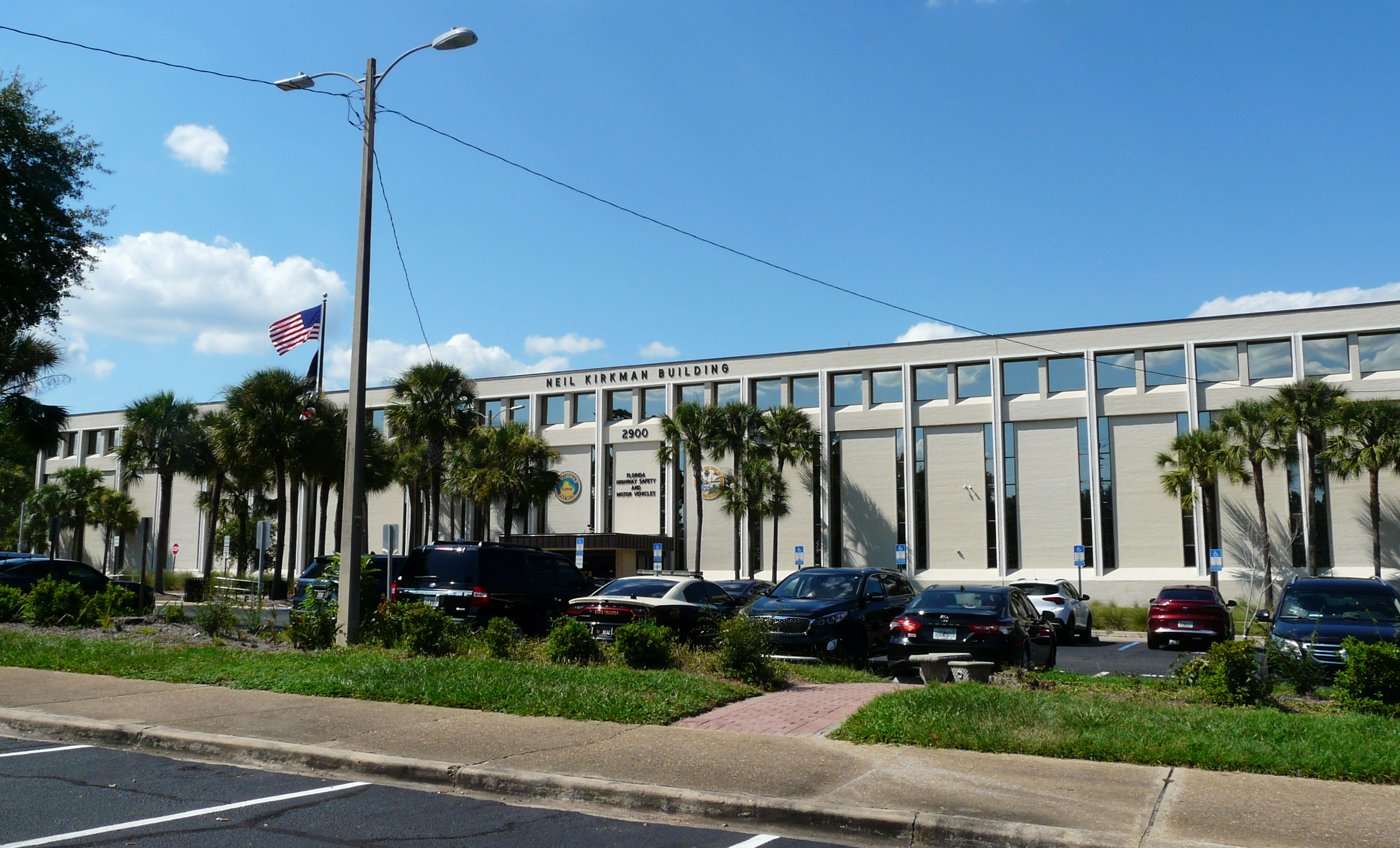
- The Neil Kirkman Building in Tallahassee

Agency overview
- Formed: 1969
- Superseding agencies: Department of Motor Vehicles; Department of Public Safety
- Jurisdiction: Florida
- Headquarters: Tallahassee, Florida
- Agency executives: Ron DeSantis, Governor; Dave Kerner, Executive Director
- Child agencies: Office of Executive Director; Division of Florida Highway Patrol; Division of Motorist Services; Division of Administrative Services; Information System Administration
- Website: flhsmv.gov

The Florida Department of Highway Safety and Motor Vehicles (FLHSMV) is a statutorily established cabinet agency of Florida government. In 1969, under Governor Claude Kirk, the Department of Motor Vehicles and the Department of Public Safety were merged forming the Department of Highway Safety and Motor Vehicles. The agency head of FLHSMV is the governor and Cabinet, with authority delegated to the executive director. The executive director has functional responsibility for directing, monitoring, supervising, coordinating, and administering all activities of the department. The executive director ensures that FLHSMV's mission and objectives are being followed, pursuant to the Florida Statutes and Florida Administrative Code. The department provides oversight and services in partnership with the various 67 Florida county tax collectors for the issuance of driver licenses, the Florida drivers license handbook registrations and titling of automobiles, trailers, boats, and mobile homes. Florida residents who are at least 15 years old can obtain a learner license after meeting the requirements.

== Mission ==
Their mission is "providing Highway Safety and Security through excellence in service, education, and enforcement".

== Divisions ==
Within FLHSMV, additional divisions are organized which operate as separate agencies, but within the framework of FLHSMV. Some of these divisions are established by Florida law within FLHSMV, while other non-statutorily established divisions and bureaus are created by the department for the administration of its mission.

As of 2015, FLHSMV had the following major Divisions within the Department:

- Office of Executive Director (OED)
- Division of Florida Highway Patrol (FHP)
- Division of Motorist Services (MS)
- Division of Administrative Services (DAS)
- Information System Administration (ISA)

The agency is headquartered in the Neil Kirkman Building in Tallahassee.
