= Florida Highway Patrol =

Law enforcement agency in Florida, United States

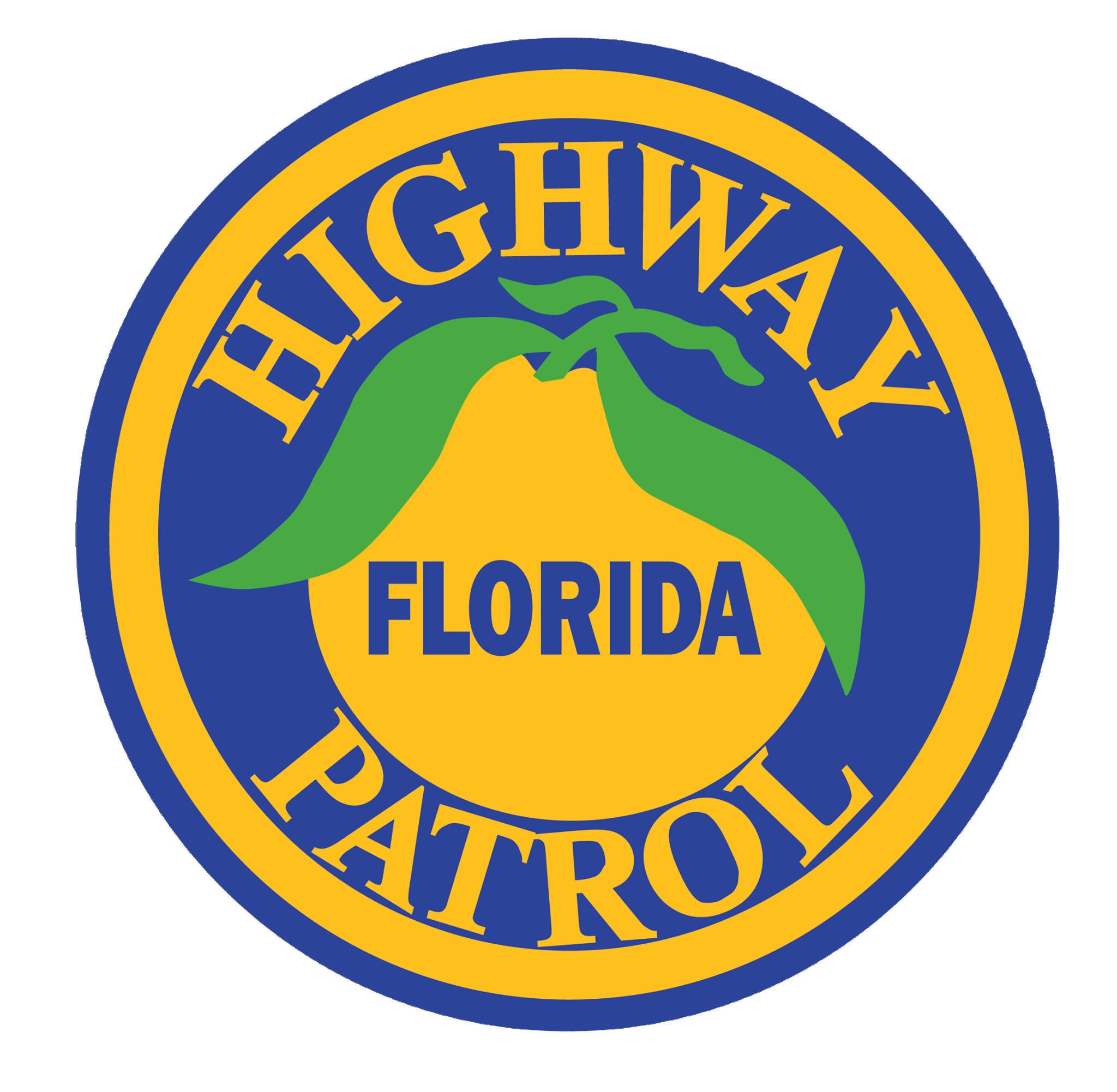
- FHP patch

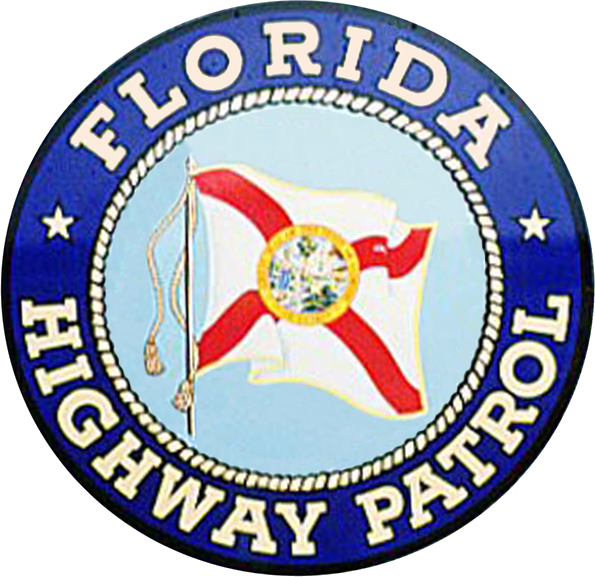
- FHP seal

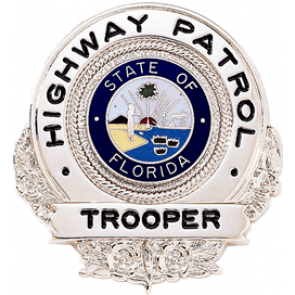
- FHP Badge
- Abbreviation: FHP
- Motto: Courtesy, Service, Protection

Agency overview
- Formed: 1939; 87 years ago
- Preceding agencies: State Road Department (1930's); Motor Carrier Compliance (absorbed 2011)
- Employees: 2,496 (total)
- Annual budget: $259.9 million (2019)

Jurisdictional structure
- Operations jurisdiction: Florida, US
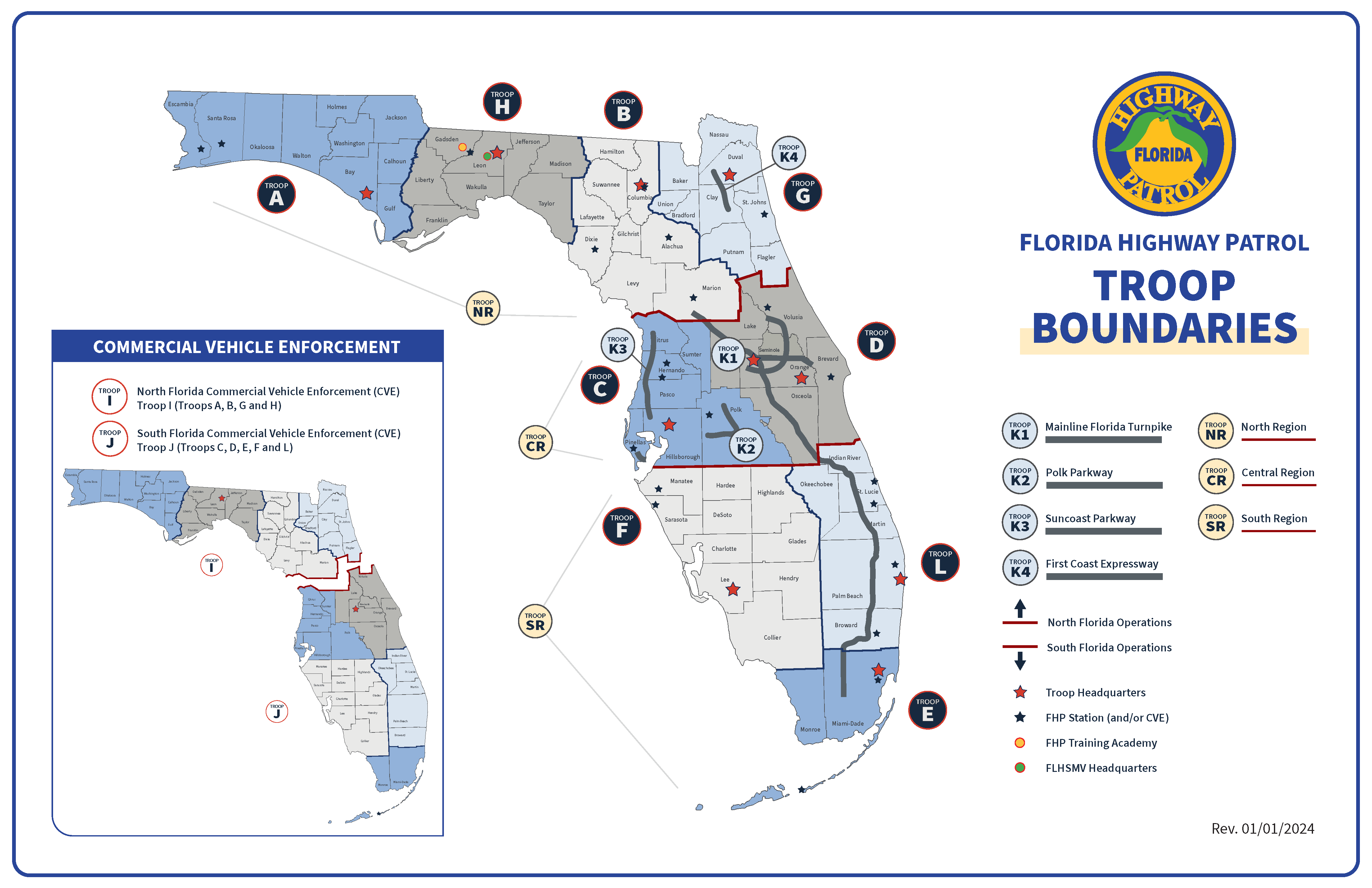
- FHP Troops & Boundaries
- Area: 65,795 square miles (170,410 km^{2})
- Population: 21,477,737 (2019)
- Legal jurisdiction: Statewide
- Governing body: Florida Legislature
- Constituting instrument: §321.05, Florida Statutes
- General nature: Civilian police

Operational structure
- Headquarters: Tallahassee, Florida
- Troopers: 1,982 Sworn Uniformed Troopers (authorized, as of 2023)
- Civilian employees: 514 Civilian Employees (2024)
- Agency executives: Colonel Gary L.Howze, Director; Lt.Colonel Robert Chandler, Deputy Director of Patrol Operations; Lt.Colonel Joseph C.Harrison, Deputy Director, Executive Officer; Lt.Colonel Mark Brown, Deputy Director of Support Operations
- Parent agency: Florida Department of Highway Safety and Motor Vehicles
- Specialized Areas: List: Academy; Aviation; Auxiliary; Background Investigation; Bureau of Criminal Investigations and Intelligence (BCII); Contraband Interdiction Unit (CIU); Commercial Vehicle Enforcement; Fleet & Property; Honor Guard; K-9; Mobile Field Force; Motors; Office of Professional Compliance; Public Affairs Offices (PAO); Quick Response Force (QRF); Recruitment; Special Response Team (SRT); Traffic Homicide Investigation
- Troop Headquarters: List: Troop A - Panama City; Troop B - Lake City; Troop C - Tampa; Troop D - Orlando; Troop E - Miami; Troop F - Fort Myers; Troop G - Jacksonville; Troop H - Tallahassee; Troop I - Tallahassee; Troop J - Orlando; Troop K - Ocoee; Troop L - Lake Worth

Facilities
- Commands: List: 12 Troops; 30 District Patrol Stations; 1 Statewide Training Academy; 7 Regional Communication Centers
- Common Vehicles: List: Ford Explorer Interceptor Chevrolet Tahoe Dodge Charger Harley Davidson Motorcycle Mine-Resistant Ambush Protected (MRAP) Vehicles
- Airplanes: 9
- Dogs: 31

Notables
- Awards: CALEA Accreditation; Commission for Florida Law Enforcement Accreditation (CFA)

Website
- Official Website

The Florida Highway Patrol (FHP) is a division of the Florida Department of Highway Safety and Motor Vehicles. It is Florida's highway patrol and is the primary law enforcement agency charged with investigating traffic crashes and criminal laws on the state's highways.

== Duties ==
A 2011 study by the Florida Highway Patrol Jurisdiction Team noted that "For all practical purposes, the FHP currently investigates all traffic crashes in the unincorporated areas of 24 counties, and in an additional 26 counties, the majority of crashes. In 17 counties, the Sheriff's Office conducts more crash investigations than the FHP."

The FHP's functional role and responsibilities vary significantly among counties. The 2011 report noted, "The staffing methodology of the FHP is largely based on historical agency decisions, formal and informal arrangements with local governments, and to some degree political influence...There is a disparity in the level of services provided to local governments that cannot be explained. In places like Orange, Escambia, Marion, and many rural counties, the FHP handles all traffic crash investigations in unincorporated areas. In other counties like Duval, Broward, and Palm Beach, the Sheriff handles a majority of traffic crash investigations on the same type of roadways. All other Florida counties fall somewhere among or between these extremes."

FHP has statewide jurisdiction, but shortfalls in FHP staffing sometimes lead to sheriff's offices and city police forces picking up more work, straining resources. Of the annual average long-form traffic crash reports completed by Florida law enforcement agencies, the 2011 study found that FHP investigated 32% of crashes, county sheriff's offices 23%, and municipal police and other agencies 45%. FHP investigates 58% of traffic fatalities in the state; these investigations are substantially more complicated than non-fatal traffic investigations. The Florida Highway Patrol differs from most State Agencies in the Country as it is not considered a State Police. Troopers are however sworn law enforcement officers with Statewide Arrest Powers, but unlike for example the Louisiana State Police, FHP only handles Traffic Enforcement and Traffic Crash Investigation on the State of Florida roadways. In Florida, the constitutional Sheriff is the Chief Law Enforcement Officer. The Florida Department of Law Enforcement, Florida's equivalent to the FBI, handles Criminal Investigations and Officer Records and Training and provides Statewide Crime Lab Services. FHP does have a Bureau of Investigation and Intelligence, but it does not do the same thing FDLE does. Its function is slightly different but works hand in hand with FDLE and other agencies. BCII handles odometer fraud, VIN number fraud, and in some cases Auto Theft Rings.

The Director of the Florida Highway Patrol serves as one of the 19 members of the Florida Criminal Justice Standards & Training Commission.

== History ==
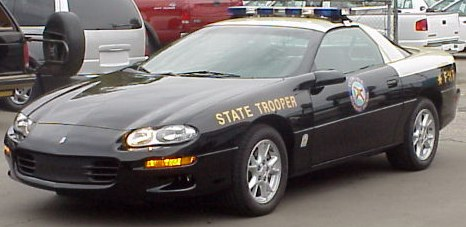
An FHP B4C Camaro

The FHP was established in 1939 under Colonel H. Neil Kirkman. Troopers originally patrolled on motorcycles; among the first patrol cars used by the force was the 1940 Ford De Luxe.

In 1948, Florida received national recognition for its driver license program from the National Safety Council.

In 1994, the FHP, in collaboration with all ten cellular phone companies operating in Florida, launched a "Dial *FHP" program, which allowed the public to make free phone calls to FHP to report highway offenses (such as drunk and reckless driving) as well as motorists in distress. The program became very popular.

On July 1, 2011, the Office of Motor Carrier Compliance (a state law enforcement agency responsible for commercial vehicle laws in the state) was transferred from the Florida Department of Transportation to the FHP (which is a division of the Florida Department of Highway Safety and Motor Vehicles). The consolidation was a result of Senate Bill 2160, passed by lawmakers during the 2011 Legislative Session, which gave responsibility for commercial vehicle licensing, registrations, fuel permits, and enforcement to DHSMV.

In 2013, the agency fired a trooper who declined to give speeding tickets to two state legislators who had been pulled over. The trooper won reinstatement after arguing that he was following an unwritten FHP practice of not issuing citations to state legislators, who control the agency's budget.

The FHP has launched a series of anti-aggressive driving campaigns, including "Operation Safe Ride" (2004–2005). FHP also launched the "Statewide Overtime Action Response" (SOAR) program targeting traffic enforcement in areas deemed high priority. An investigation by the Department of Highway Safety and Motor Vehicles' office of inspector general into the SOAR program found that more than a dozen troopers, including several with decades of service had committed misconduct by receiving overtime pay for hours spent not working, among other offenses; some of the troopers were fired, while others were suspended or internally disciplined. The troopers' lawyers argued that their clients had followed longstanding unwritten FHP rules.

=== Racial discrimination ===
In 2019, the Office of Inspector General conducted a review of Florida Highway Patrol Troopers and bias-based profiling. The results of the review were published January 14, 2020.

A 2021 study in the American Economic Review found that minorities were significantly less likely to receive discounts on their traffic tickets than White drivers; the study estimated that 42% of FHP troopers practiced racial discrimination.

== Ranks and organization ==
The Commander of the Florida Highway Patrol is the Director. The Director holds the rank of Colonel. The Director reports to the Executive Director of the Florida Department of Highway Safety and Motor Vehicles. Under the Director, there are three deputy directors. The Deputy Directors hold the Rank of Lieutenant Colonel. They assist and report to the director. The FHP is divided into three main bureaus: the Bureau of Records and Training, which includes operating the Florida Highway Patrol Academy in Tallahassee, and the Bureau of Field Operations.

The Bureau of Field Operations is split into three regions: the Northern Region, Central Region, and Southern Region. These regions are headed by a chief.

Additionally, the FHP has a Special Services Command and a Commercial Vehicle Enforcement team. Both are led by a chief who holds the same rank as the regional commanders.

Patrol operation chiefs oversee three regions:

- Northern Region: Northern Region is commanded by Chief John Gourley. Troops within this Region include Troops A, B, G, and H.
- Central Region: Central Region is commanded by Chief Chris Blackmon. Troops within this region include Troops C, D, and K.
- Southern Region: Southern Region is commanded by Chief Joseph M. Franza Jr. Troops within this region include Troops E, F, and L.

Each troop is responsible for enforcement activities within specific areas that cover various counties. Some troops have statewide or regional responsibilities, including those assigned to weigh station enforcement. For instance:

- Troop K patrols Florida's Turnpike.
- Troop I handles commercial vehicle enforcement in North Florida.
- Troop J oversees commercial vehicle enforcement in South Florida.

The commander of each troop holds the rank of Major.

Promotions within the ranks of Corporal (Trooper II), Sergeant, Lieutenant, and Captain require specific minimum service times and the successful completion of a promotional examination. Specifically:

- Promotion to Corporal: This requires a written examination.
- Promotion to Sergeant and Lieutenant: This requires a written examination and an assessment.
- Promotion to Captain: This requires a written examination and an interview.

A career development system was created for troopers through sergeants, which included additional ranks based on years of service and education/training, along with plans for financial incentives. However, funding for this system was never approved, and as a result, the additional ranks are awarded solely based on recognition of years of service within each grade. Corporal ranks must also show proof of case experience to receive recognition for an advanced rank.

Title	Insignia	Additional information
Florida Highway Patrol Director (Rank Of Colonel)		The Director of the Florida Highway Patrol holds the rank of colonel. The Director is the commander of the Florida Highway Patrol. The Director reports to the Executive Director of the Florida Department of Highway Safety and Motor Vehicles
Deputy Directors (Rank Of Lieutenant colonel)		There are Three Deputy Directors in the Florida Highway Patrol. They hold the Rank Of Lieutenant Colonel. They Report to the Director.
Major		Majors are in charge of an even larger area. It usually has big sections of the state.
Captain		Captains are in charge of a larger area and share similar responsibilities to a lieutenant.
Lieutenant		Lieutenants are senior supervisors and usually lead a unit or section of troopers.
Master sergeant		Master sergeants are supervisors of patrol squads, units, sections, or specialty positions with 8 years in grade. There is also a sergeant of patrol who holds the rank of master sergeant. The sergeant of the patrol is the most senior sergeant of the Highway Patrol.
Sergeant first class		Sergeant first classes are supervisors of patrol squads, units, sections, or they might have specialty positions with 5 years in grade.
Staff sergeant		Staff sergeants are supervisors of patrol squads, units, sections, or they might have specialty positions with 3 years in grade.
Sergeant		Sergeants are supervisors of patrol squads, units, sections, or they have specialty positions.
Master Corporal		The Master Corporal rank is granted to those who have served with the Florida Highway Patrol in the capacity of a Corporal (Traffic Homicide Investigator) for 5 years in grade.
Senior Corporal		The senior corporal rank is granted to those who have served with the Florida Highway Patrol in the capacity of a Corporal (Traffic Homicide Investigator) for 3 years in grade.
Corporal		Corporals are Traffic Homicide Investigators with no supervisory roles other than on fatal crash scenes.
Master Trooper		The master trooper rank is granted to those who have served with the Florida Highway Patrol for 20 years.
Senior Trooper		The senior trooper rank is granted to those who have served with the Florida Highway Patrol for 13 years.
Trooper First Class		The trooper first class rank is granted to those who have served with the Florida Highway Patrol for 7 years
Trooper specialist		The trooper specialist rank is granted to those who have served with the Florida Highway Patrol for 2 years
Trooper		Trooper is the rank achieved after graduating from the academy

== Size ==
As of 2004, the FHP had 1,654 full-time, sworn personnel. This was about 10 full-time troopers for every 100,000 residents, one of the lowest ratios in the country.

The FHP's website stated in 2021 that the agency was authorized for a total of 2,475 full-time employees (1,946 sworn and 529 non-sworn).

== Employment demographics ==
In 1979, the United States Department of Justice sued the Florida Highway Patrol, alleging race and sex discrimination in employment. The State of Florida entered into a settlement with the Justice Department, which was incorporated into a consent decree entered by the U.S. District Court for the Northern District of Florida on July 12, 1979. The Consent Decree required the Patrol to hire more minorities and women. In 1985, following a policy change by the Reagan administration, the Justice Department changed its position and required agencies with existing affirmative action consent decrees, including the Florida Highway Patrol, to "end the use of numerical goals and quotas designed to increase employment of women, blacks or Hispanic Americans."

As of 2017, FHP sworn members are 61% white, 14% African American, 23% Hispanic, and 2% other. FHP sworn members are 89% male and 11% female.

== Weapons, vehicles, and equipment ==
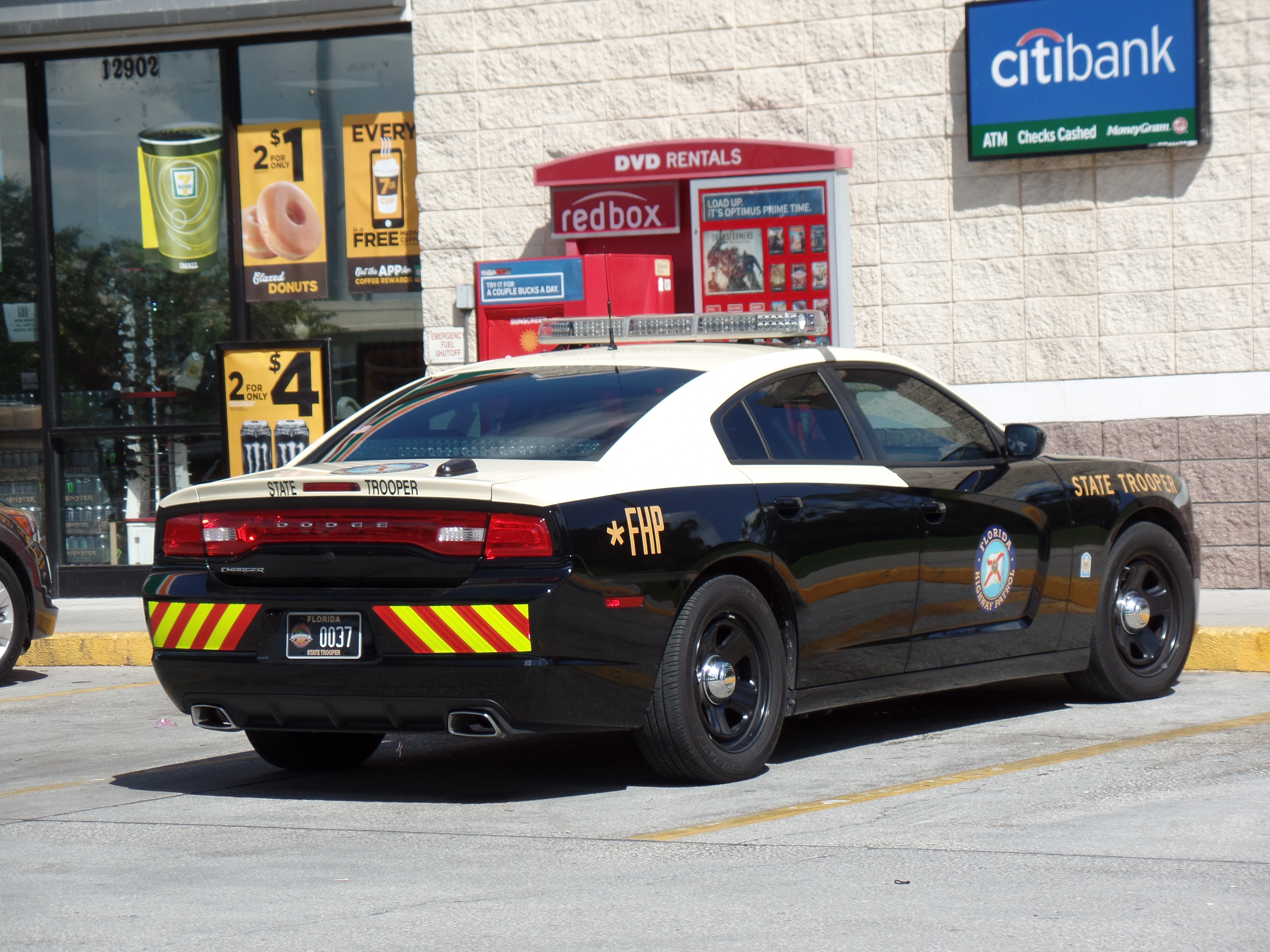
A Dodge Charger (LD) in FHP service, bearing the prescribed livery pictured October 2014

Florida law designates the prescribed colors as 'Florida Highway Patrol black and tan.' Florida law makes it a misdemeanor crime to cause a vehicle or motorcycle to be the same or similar colors as prescribed by FHP. A 1998 Legislative review determined the paint added $657 to the purchase of each vehicle. Prior to the vehicles being decommissioned, the Patrol defaces the cars so that they cannot be misconstrued as official law enforcement vehicles. The defaced, two-tone paint reduces each car's resale value by approximately $400.

In 2004, an anonymous Florida resident donated 18 stealthy Third Gen. Mercury Marauders for the FHP's use. In 2017, the FHP deployed a small number of "subdued cruisers" (nicknamed "Ghost Cruisers") for enforcement, assigning one to each of the state's dozen patrol troops.

As of 2007, FHP owned eight airplanes.

In 2010, FHP adopted the Glock 37 Gen 4 and the subcompact Glock 39, both in .45 GAP, as the patrol's duty weapon. As of 2021, FHP's primary service weapon is the Glock 45 MOS. The Glock 45 MOS is a compact 9x19mm handgun.

== Troop Layout ==
The Florida Highway Patrol's troops cover the following counties as listed:

Troop	Counties covered
Troop A	Bay, Calhoun, Escambia, Gulf, Holmes, Jackson, Okaloosa, Santa Rosa, Walton, Washington
Troop B	Alachua, Columbia, Dixie, Gilchrist, Hamilton, Lafayette, Levy, Marion, Suwannee
Troop C	Citrus, Hernando, Hillsborough, Pasco, Pinellas, Polk, Sumter
Troop D	Brevard, Lake, Orange, Osceola, Seminole, Volusia
Troop E	Miami-Dade, Monroe
Troop F	Charlotte, Collier, DeSoto, Glades, Hardee, Hendry, Highlands, Lee, Manatee, Sarasota
Troop G	Baker, Bradford, Clay, Duval, Flagler, Nassau, Putnam, St. Johns, Union
Troop H	Franklin, Gadsden, Jefferson, Leon, Liberty, Madison, Taylor, Wakulla
Troop K	Florida's Turnpike, Polk Parkway, Suncoast Parkway, First Coast Expressway
Troop L	Broward, Indian River, Martin, Okeechobee, Palm Beach, St. Lucie

== Florida Highway Patrol Auxiliary ==
The Florida Highway Patrol is authorized by Florida law to have an Auxiliary force. The Auxiliary personnel are volunteers who dedicate a minimum number of hours on a part-time, but regularly recurring basis to supplement the Florida Highway Patrol in its legislated duties. The maximum number of auxiliary personnel is limited by law. Auxiliary personnel receive no individual wages, health or insurance benefits, and may not work as auxiliary troopers for compensation (e.g. off-duty employment).

Just as with any Florida law enforcement officer, auxiliary personnel who wish to be considered for a traditional Auxiliary trooper position must meet minimum statutory qualification criteria. Additionally, auxiliary members must successfully meet other requirements including submitting a State of Florida application and fingerprints, undergoing a background investigation, passing mandated Florida Department of Law Enforcement (FDLE) and agency law enforcement training requirements. Once certified, Auxiliary troopers are Florida certified auxiliary law enforcement officers. State law provides that while serving under the supervision and direction of a full-time trooper, auxiliary troopers have the power to bear arms and make arrests. The supervision and direction of a full-time trooper may come in the form of being present at the scene or in radio contact with the auxiliary trooper. Auxiliary troopers wear agency-issued sidearms and similar but slightly distinctive uniforms.

The Auxiliary is overseen by a high-ranking full-time command staff member of the Florida Highway Patrol who acts as the auxiliary coordinator. Throughout the state, each auxiliary unit is supervised by a full-time member who comes under the purview of the troop commander within each troop.

Auxiliary duties include: patrolling the highways of the state, assisting motorists, participating in vehicle equipment and license checkpoints, operating the mobile Breath Alcohol Testing (BAT) Unit, and participating in specialized events or details relevant to traffic related matter.

== Troop Surgeon Program ==
The Florida Highway Patrol's Troop Surgeon Program supports the health and safety of state troopers. A rigorous vetting process is employed to ensure that only the highest caliber of medical professionals are appointed to the position.Bradley Feuer, DO, JD serves as Chief Surgeon.
