= Lauren's Kids =

American nonprofit organization

The Lauren's Kids Foundation (also known as Lauren's Kids) is an American anti-child sexual abuse nonprofit organization based in the state of Florida. The company was founded by Florida-based politician Lauren Book and has been promoted by American lobbyist and Lauren Book's father Ron Book. The organization has been criticized for its connections to Florida political authorities and for allegedly receiving outsized state grants.

== History ==
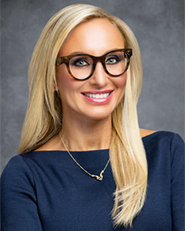
Book in 2021

Lauren's Kids was founded in 2007 by Lauren Book. According to her, most of the organization's resources have been allocated to its Safer, Smarter Kids initiative, which, she said, trains adults to identify signs of child sexual abuse in children. She stated that, according to a study by the Florida Council Against Sexual Violence, a pilot program designed by Lauren's Kids had resulted in a 77% increase of children's knowledge about child sexual abuse.

Ron Book, a Tallahassee attorney and lobbyist who is also Lauren Book's father, has served as the firm's chairman. As of 2018, both Ron and Lauren Book were serving on the organization's board of directors. Ron Book has helped Lauren promote the organization, and, in 2010, promoted Lauren's Kids to employees of the county where he worked.

=== Finances and state funding ===
Lauren's kids received a total of $486,116 in government grants in 2011, $1.6 million in 2012 and $1.1 million in 2013. The total amount of private contributions in the same period was of $1.4 million. According to state records, the organization received $5 million in lobbying fees in 2014. The nonprofit was the most funded out of the 27 organizations that had applied to Florida's School and Instructional Enhancements Allocation Funds in 2015, receiving $3.8 million out of a $19 million pool, twice more than any other applicant.

Despite not requesting the funding, the organization received another $1.5 million state grant in 2015 in order to perform activities that it was already performing before. In relation to that, Ron Book stated that "this is one of the most underfunded and neglected areas of Florida's budget". As of 2018, Lauren's Kids had received a total of more than $10 million from state funds. Lauren Book's annual salary in 2011 and 2013 was of $68,000 and $95.000, respectively.

After the organization received $3 million in government grants in 2015, some lawmakers in Florida's House and Senate Appropriations committees were surprised. Democratic state senator Dwight Bullard said in 2015 that he had not "quite understood why there's been such exponential growth in Lauren’s Kids as a budget item".
