= Florida Sheriffs Youth Ranches =

- Founded: 1957
- Type: Child and Family Services Organization
- Location: Live Oak, Florida
- Region served: Florida
- Website: www.youthranches.org

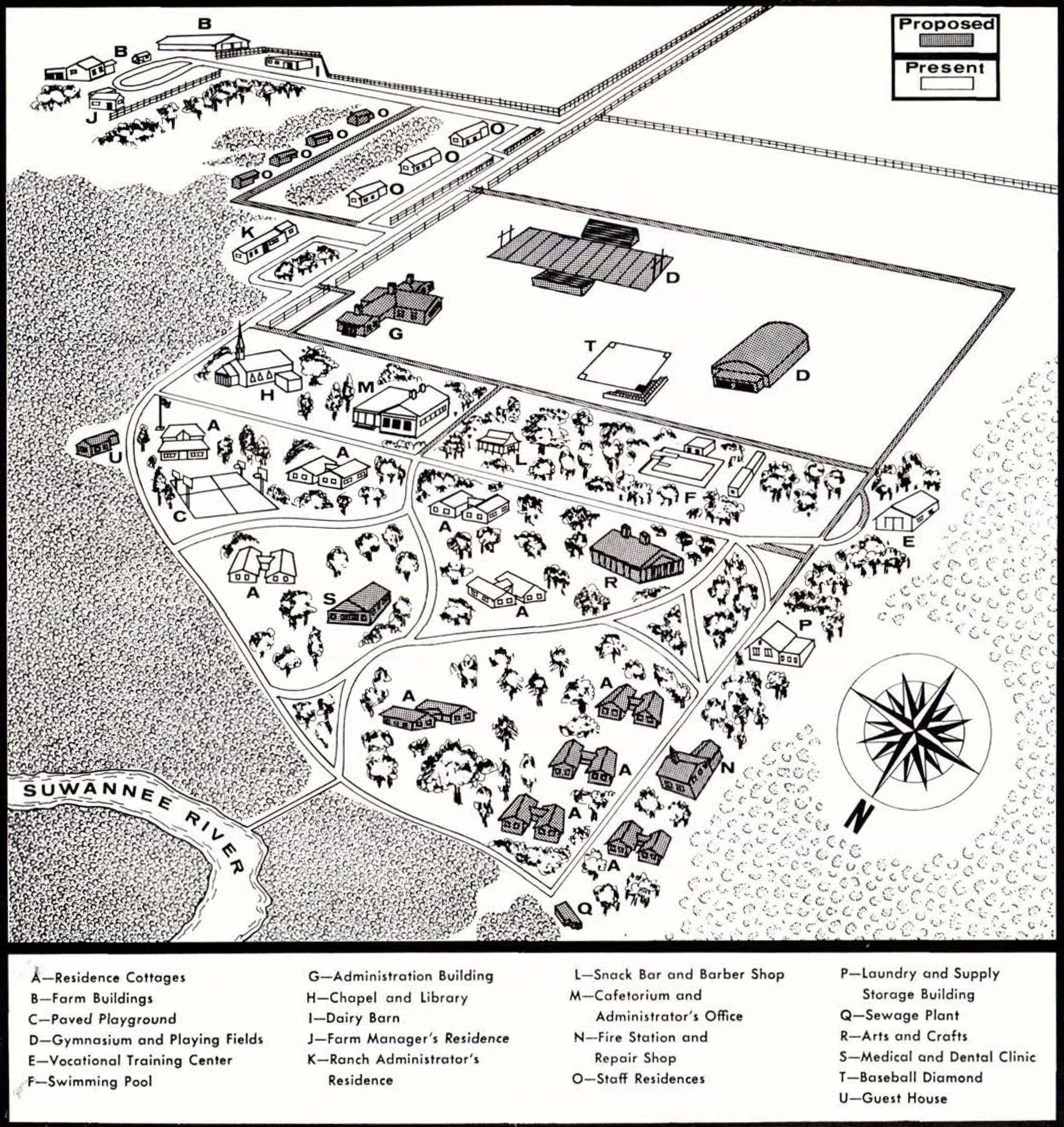
Florida Sheriffs Boys Ranch, Live Oak, Florida 1967 map

Florida Sheriffs Youth Ranches, Inc. (FSYR, Inc.) is a 501c3 non-profit residential child and family services organization founded by The Florida Sheriffs Association in 1957. FSYR, Inc.’s mission is to prevent juvenile delinquency and develop strong, lawful, resilient and productive citizens who will make a positive contribution to their communities for years to come.

== History ==
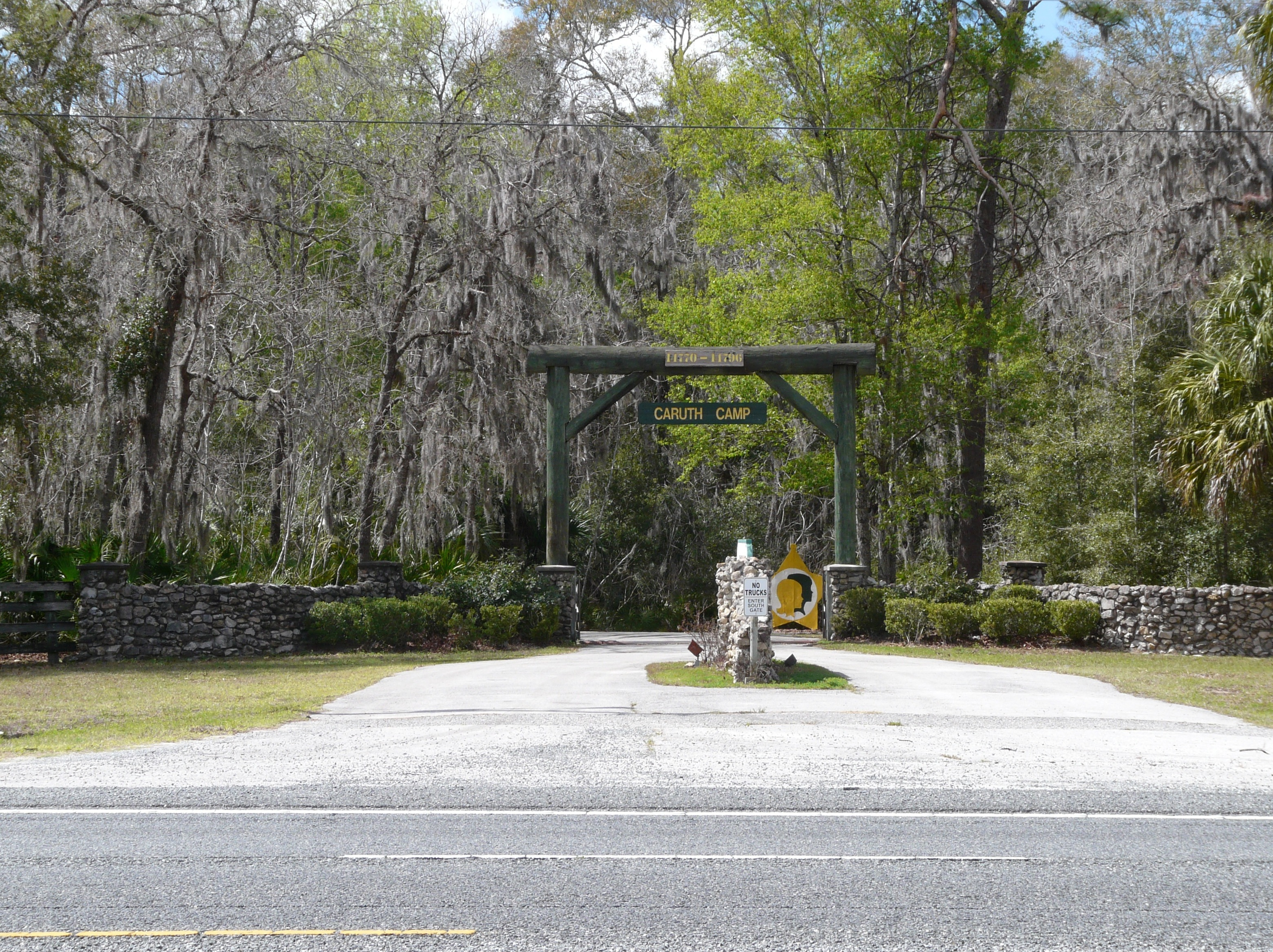
Caruth Camp in Levy County

In 1957, the Florida Sheriffs Association founded the first Florida Sheriffs Boys Ranch. With $5,000 and 160 acres (0.65 km^{2}) of donated land on the banks of the Suwannee River, the Ranch aimed to act as a home for needy, neglected and unwanted boys. Though the project struggled to stay afloat in its first few years of operation, the Boys Ranch developed into a popular and highly successful program. In 1971, ground was broken for a sister program to the Boys Ranch – the Girls Villa, followed by a third Youth Ranch in 1975.

In 1977, the Boys Ranch, Girls Villa and a third Youth Ranch merged into one legal entity known as the Florida Sheriffs Youth Fund. In 1986, the Youth Fund underwent another title transformation as it legally changed its name to the Florida Sheriffs Youth Ranches, Inc. The program now consists of six sites throughout the state, and it operates independently from the Florida Sheriffs Association, though the Sheriffs remain key supporters. Since its founding, the FSYR, Inc. has served more than 100,000 boys and girls and their families.

== Services ==
FSYR, Inc. provides three main areas of services to the state. These include:

- Nationally renowned residential child-care campuses, cottages and villas throughout the state of Florida that offer a stable home and devoted staff to needy children.
- Camping services that provide a wholesome atmosphere and camping experience for boys and girls ages 10–15.
- Community based clinical and family facilities that provide social services for youth and their families.

== Locations ==
FSYR has established six facilities throughout the state. The locations are:

- Live Oak, Florida (founded in 1957 as the Boys Ranch).
- Bartow, Florida (founded in 1972 as the Girls Villa).
- Safety Harbor, Florida (founded in 1975 as the Youth Ranch, the first ranch to allow brothers and sisters to stay together).
- Barberville, Florida (formerly a Girl Scout Camp, the Youth Camp was acquired by the Youth Ranches in 1982).
- Inglis, Florida (originally leased in 1986 to FSYR, Inc. by W.W. Caruth Jr. The deed to the Caruth Camp was presented to the FSYR in 1996).
- Bradenton, Florida (founded in 1984 as the Manatee River Youth Ranch. In 1991, FSYR, Inc. merged the program into their statewide network of residential childcare facilities).
