= Florida Sheriffs Association =

U.S. non-profit professional association

- Founded: 1893
- Type: Nonprofit
- Location: Florida
- Origins: Tallahassee, FL
- Website: www.flsheriffs.org

The Florida Sheriffs Association (FSA) is a 501(c)(3) non-profit professional association of Florida's 67 elected Sheriffs.

== History ==
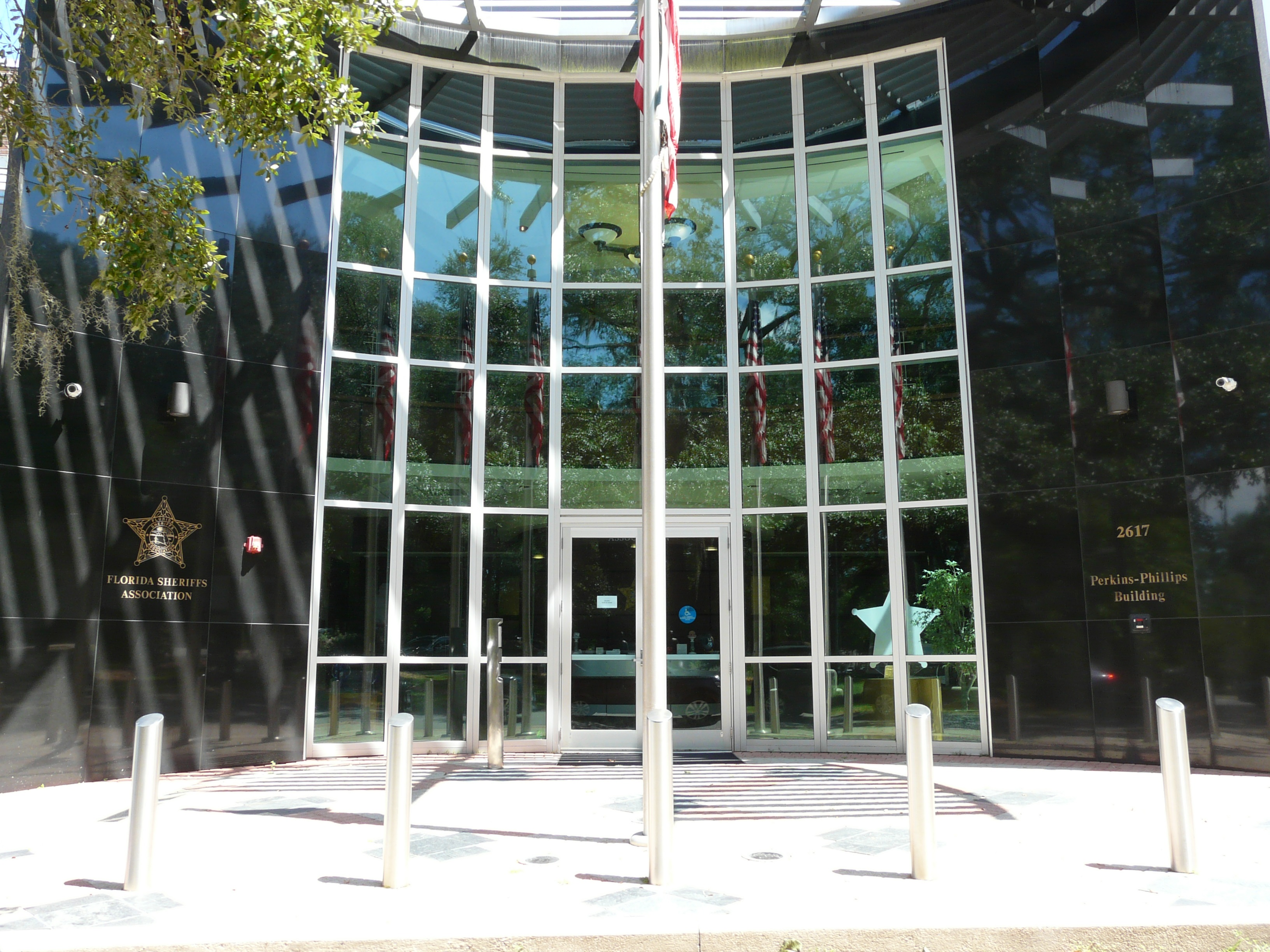
Florida Sheriffs Association headquarters in Tallahassee

In 1893, Duval County Sheriff Napoleon B. Broward, who later served as governor of Florida, helped organize the Florida Sheriffs’ Mutual Benefit. In 1910, the Florida Sheriffs' Mutual Benefit Association changed names to become the Florida Sheriffs Association. Today, FSA represents 67 counties and their law enforcement agencies. Since then, FSA's development of law enforcement, educational and charitable activities within the state, and engagement with citizens has helped transform it into one of the largest state law enforcement agencies in the nation.

FSA has founded and helped organize a multitude of programs, including the Florida Sheriffs Youth Ranches, Florida Law Enforcement Academy, Florida Sheriffs Task Force, Florida Corrections Accreditation Commission, Cold Case Advisory Commission, the Teen Driver Challenge, and several others. Through the implementation of these programs FSA aims to unify Florida sheriffs in purpose and voice for the protection of Florida's citizens and visitors.

== Services ==
FSA provides services such as training, special task forces and legislative and legal services to help improve Florida Sheriffs' Offices and the law-enforcement community. These include:

- Fostering effective law enforcement within the state.
- Offering training, educational seminars and professional networking opportunities for law-enforcement officers.
- Working in partnership with state and local government to develop and implement public policies.
- Providing discount purchasing programs for state and local government agencies and affordable insurance programs for Sheriffs' Offices.
- Promoting public support of the Florida Sheriffs Youth Ranches, the Florida Sheriff's Explorer youth program and Teen Driver Challenge.
- Informing the public of new developments and trends in law enforcement, crime prevention and public safety.

== Leadership ==
FSA is managed by a 17-member elected board of directors, all of whom are sheriffs. The corporation is managed by a board of five officers and 12 other members, all of whom are sheriffs. To ensure statewide representation, active member Sheriffs in each of four divided districts nominate three directors from each district to comprise the 12-member board. The five officers are nominated from any of the four districts.

== Key programs ==
=== Accreditation Assistance Program ===
Established in 2021, this program was created to support the Florida sheriffs’ offices in achieving and maintaining law enforcement accreditation from the Commission for Florida Law Enforcement Accreditation (CFA). FSA Accreditation Coordinators assist these agencies with policy development and review, facilities inspections, and training required to meet accreditation standards

=== Cold Case Advisory Commission ===
Many of our sheriffs’ offices have unsolved homicide and missing person cases in an open status pending additional evidence or information. The Cold Case Advisory Commission was created in response to this, and meets quarterly to discuss strategies, hear cold case investigation case presentations, and offer resources and/or advice regarding legal strategy.

=== Florida Jail Information System ===
FJIS provides a multi-jurisdictional database and search engine for criminal justice agencies. It was developed to bridge the information gap by giving these agencies a central location to post and search data in an easy and inexpensive manner. FJIS gives criminal justice professionals an instant, up-to-date database of booking records, incident reports and other data from thousands of agencies across the country.

=== Scholarship Programs ===
The Florida Sheriffs Association is pleased to offer scholarships to children of sheriffs’ office full-time employees seeking degrees in the field of criminal justice or the STEM field. FSA will award ten scholarships valued at $2,000 per year for each category.

=== Florida Sheriffs Youth Ranches ===
In 1957, the FSA founded the Florida Sheriffs Boys Ranch, built to prevent delinquency and help Florida's youth to become lawful, resilient and productive citizens. Although the project struggled to stay afloat in its first years of operation, it eventually became the Florida Sheriffs Youth Ranches (FSYR) and has expanded to over six different locations throughout the state. The FSYR has provided over 100,000 boys and girls with residential care, camp services and family services.

=== Florida Sheriffs Explorers Association ===
The Law Enforcement Explorer Program was established in the 1960s in attempts to attract young, motivated individuals with an interest for a career in law enforcement. Through this program, young adults aging from 14 to 21 can be associated with a sheriff's office, train and learn about the profession to determine if it's the right career track for them.

=== FSA Teen Driver Challenge ===
In 2006, the FSA developed the Teen Driver Challenge, a road traffic safety program to combat the high crash and fatality rate of teen drivers on Florida highways and state roads. The program is designed around both in-classroom activities and hands-on instructional driving by certified and highly trained law-enforcement officers. The course is currently offered in 35 of the 67 counties in Florida.

== Other accomplishments ==
- FSA established the Florida Sheriff's Bureau in 1955, forerunner to what is known today as the Florida Department of Law Enforcement.
- FSA founded the Florida Law Enforcement Academy, the state's first statewide training academy, in 1963.
- FSA was fundamental in creating the Florida Criminal Justice Standards and Training Commission in 1967.
- FSA established the Florida Sheriffs Self-Insurance Fund in 1978, which has saved taxpayers millions of dollars on liability claims and annual premiums.
- FSA created the Florida Sheriffs Task Force Pool in 1989 to join resources between the 67 sheriffs’ offices and address specific areas of concern.
- In 2002, FSA dedicated the Florida Sheriffs Law Enforcement Memorial on the grounds of the FSA headquarters in Tallahassee. The names of every Florida deputy killed in the line of duty is inscribed on the large granite wall at the center of the memorial. Each spring, a service is held at the memorial to honor those who lost their lives in the previous year.
- FSA helped launch the Florida Deputy Sheriffs Association in 2008 as a means to provide insurance protection, legal benefits, and other services to Florida deputies.
- In 2011, the Perkins-Phillips Building was dedicated as the new headquarters of the Florida Sheriffs Association.
- In 2017, FSA added a bronze K-9 sculpture to the Florida Sheriffs Law Enforcement Memorial in order to recognize and honor all the brave K9's killed in the line of duty.
- In 2018, FSA led a statewide educational campaign to educate citizens about the importance of elected sheriffs, resulting in the passage of Amendment 10.
- In 2019, The Florida Sheriffs Research Institute was established to conduct comprehensive research on a variety of topics that affect public safety and our communities.
- FSA launched an official podcast in 2020 named FSAcast. The platform shares conversations with Florida's sheriffs, elected officials, law enforcement professionals, and national leaders.
