= Government of Florida =

Government of a U.S. state

- Great Seal of the State of Florida
- Polity type: Sub-national administrative division (federated state)
- Part of: United States of America
- Constitution: Constitution of Florida

Legislative branch
- Name: Legislature
- Type: Bicameral
- Meeting place: Florida Capitol
- Upper house
- Name: Senate
- Presiding officer: Ben Albritton, President
- Lower house
- Name: House of Representatives
- Presiding officer: Daniel Perez, Speaker

Executive branch
- Head of state and government
- Title: Governor
- Currently: Ron DeSantis
- Appointer: Election
- Cabinet
- Name: Cabinet
- Leader: Governor
- Deputy leader: Lieutenant Governor
- Headquarters: State Capitol

Judicial branch
- Name: Judiciary of Florida
- Courts: Courts of Florida
- Supreme Court of Florida
- Chief judge: Carlos G. Muñiz
- Seat: Tallahassee

The government of Florida is established and operated according to the Constitution of Florida and is composed of three branches of government: the executive branch consisting of the governor of Florida and the other elected and appointed constitutional officers; the legislative branch, the Florida Legislature, consisting of the Senate and House; and the judicial branch consisting of the Supreme Court of Florida and lower courts. The state also allows direct participation of the electorate by initiative, referendum, and ratification.

== Executive branch ==
The executive branch of the government of Florida consists of the governor, lieutenant governor, Florida Cabinet (which includes the attorney general, commissioner of agriculture and chief financial officer), and several executive departments. Each office term is limited to two four-year terms.

Elected executive officials in Florida
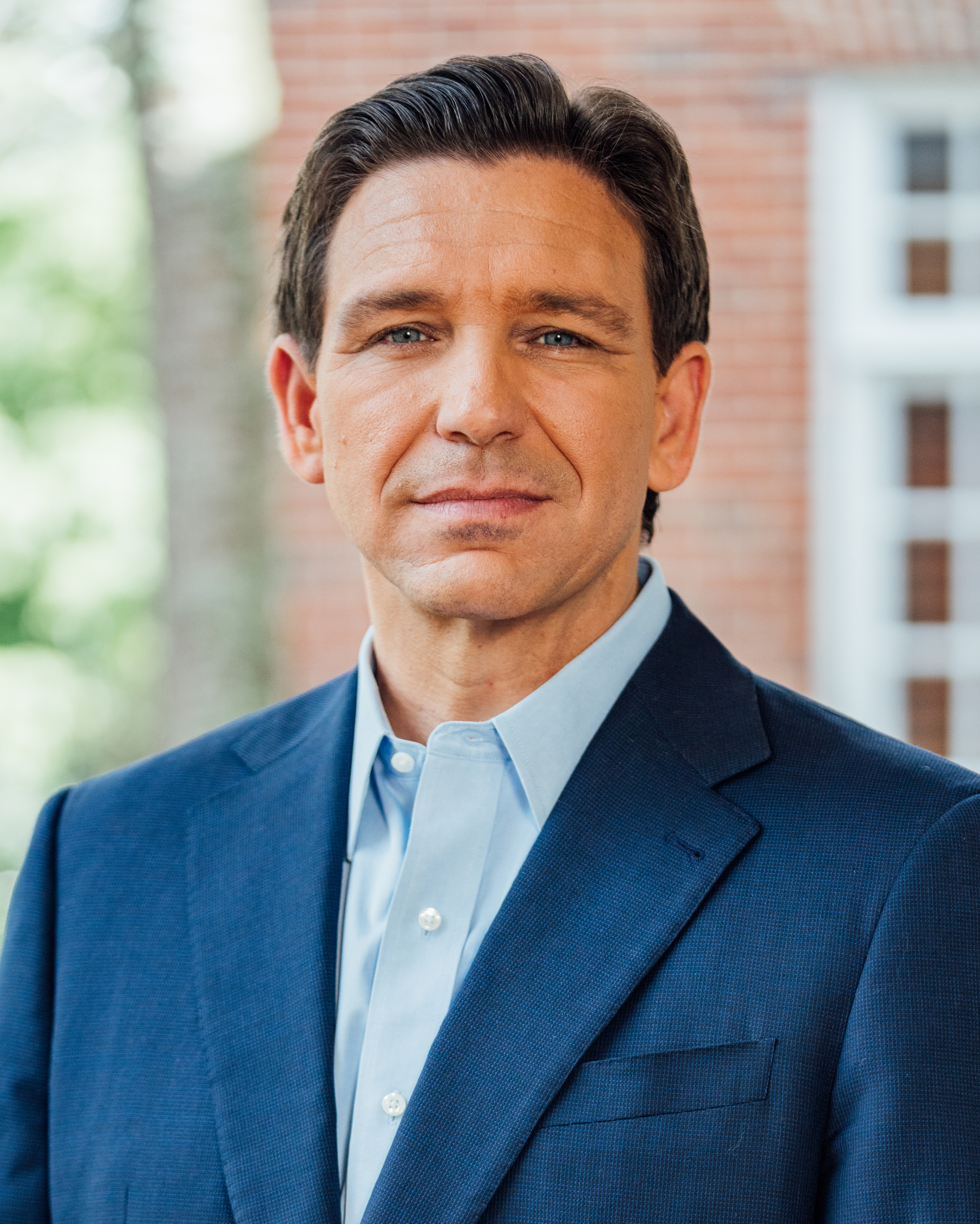
Ron DeSantis (R)
Governor

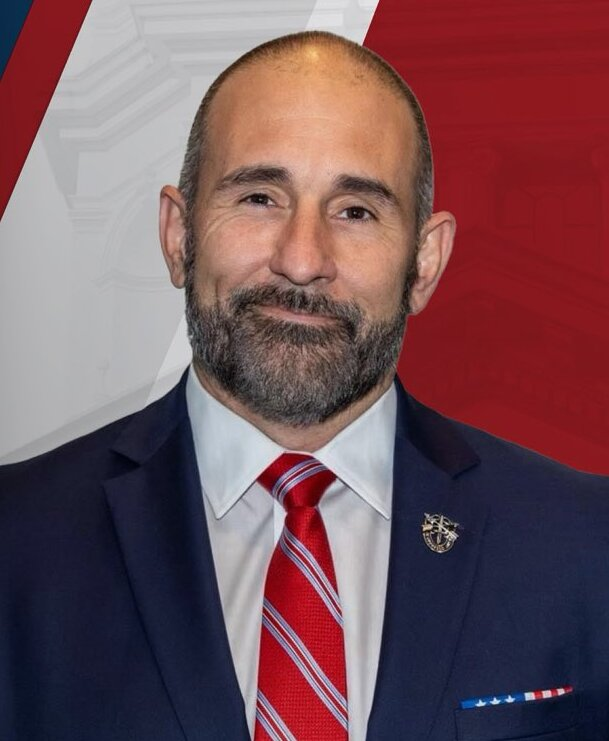
Jay Collins (R)
Lieutenant Governor

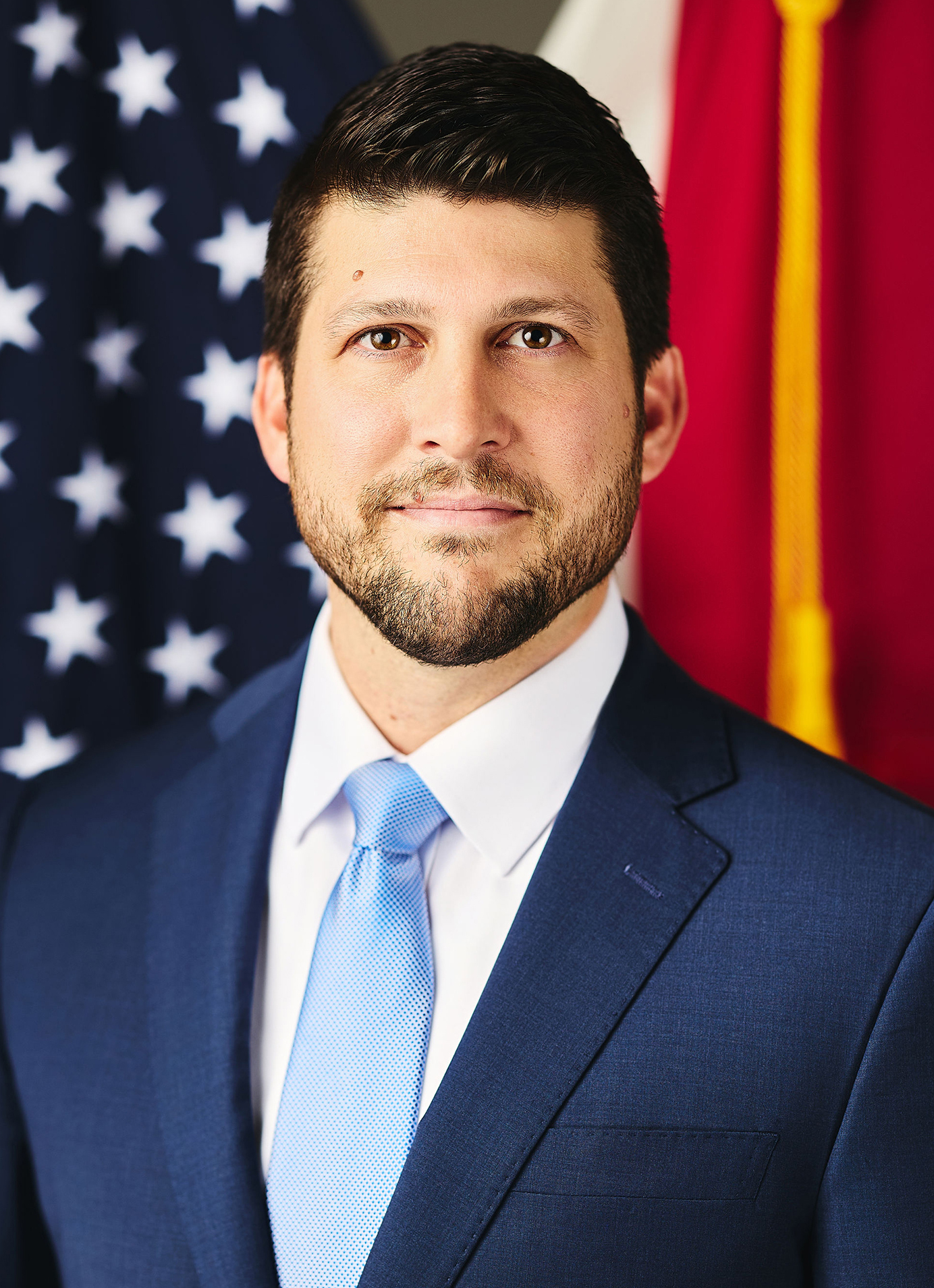
James Uthmeier (R)
Attorney General

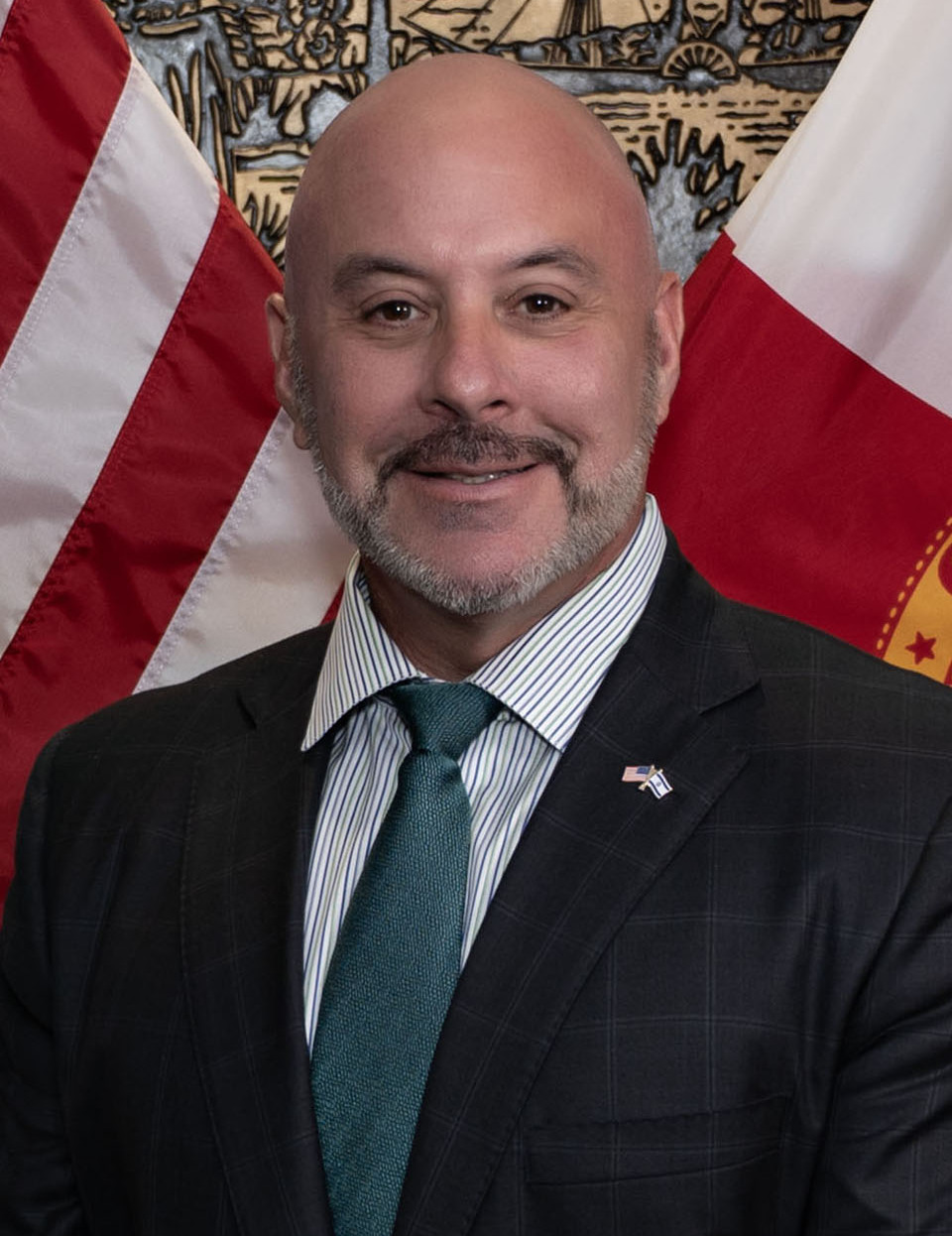
Blaise Ingoglia (R)
Chief Financial Officer

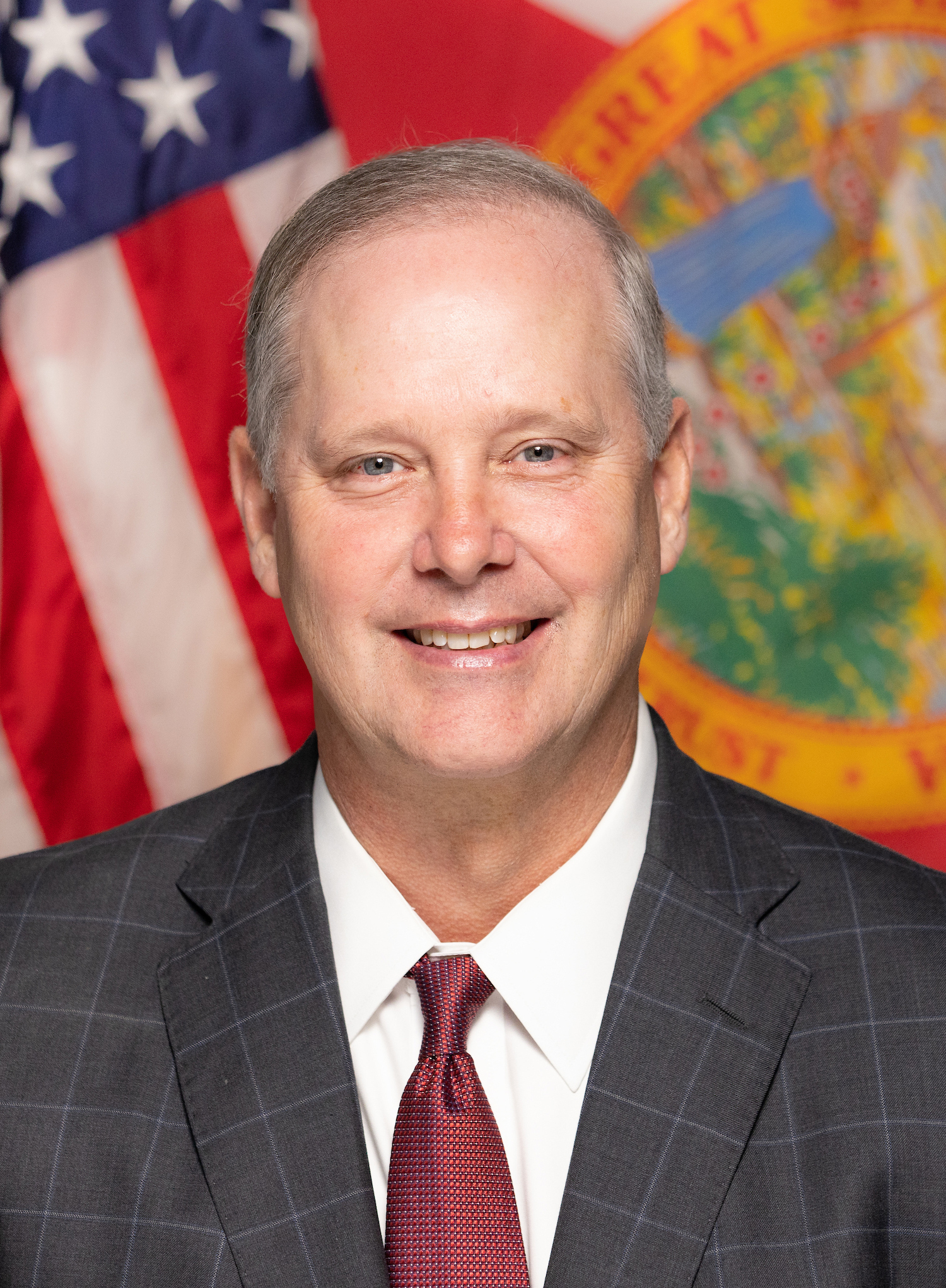
Wilton Simpson (R)
Commissioner of Agriculture and Consumer Services

=== Governor ===
The governor of Florida is the chief executive of the government of Florida and the chief administrative officer of the state responsible for the planning and budgeting for the state and serves as chair when the governor and the Florida Cabinet sit as a decision-making body in various constitutional roles. The governor has the power to execute Florida's laws and to call out the state militia to preserve the public peace, being commander-in-chief of the state's military forces that are not in active service of the United States. At least once every legislative session, the governor is required to deliver the "State of the State Address" to the Florida Legislature regarding the condition and operation of the state government and to suggest new legislation.

=== Cabinet ===
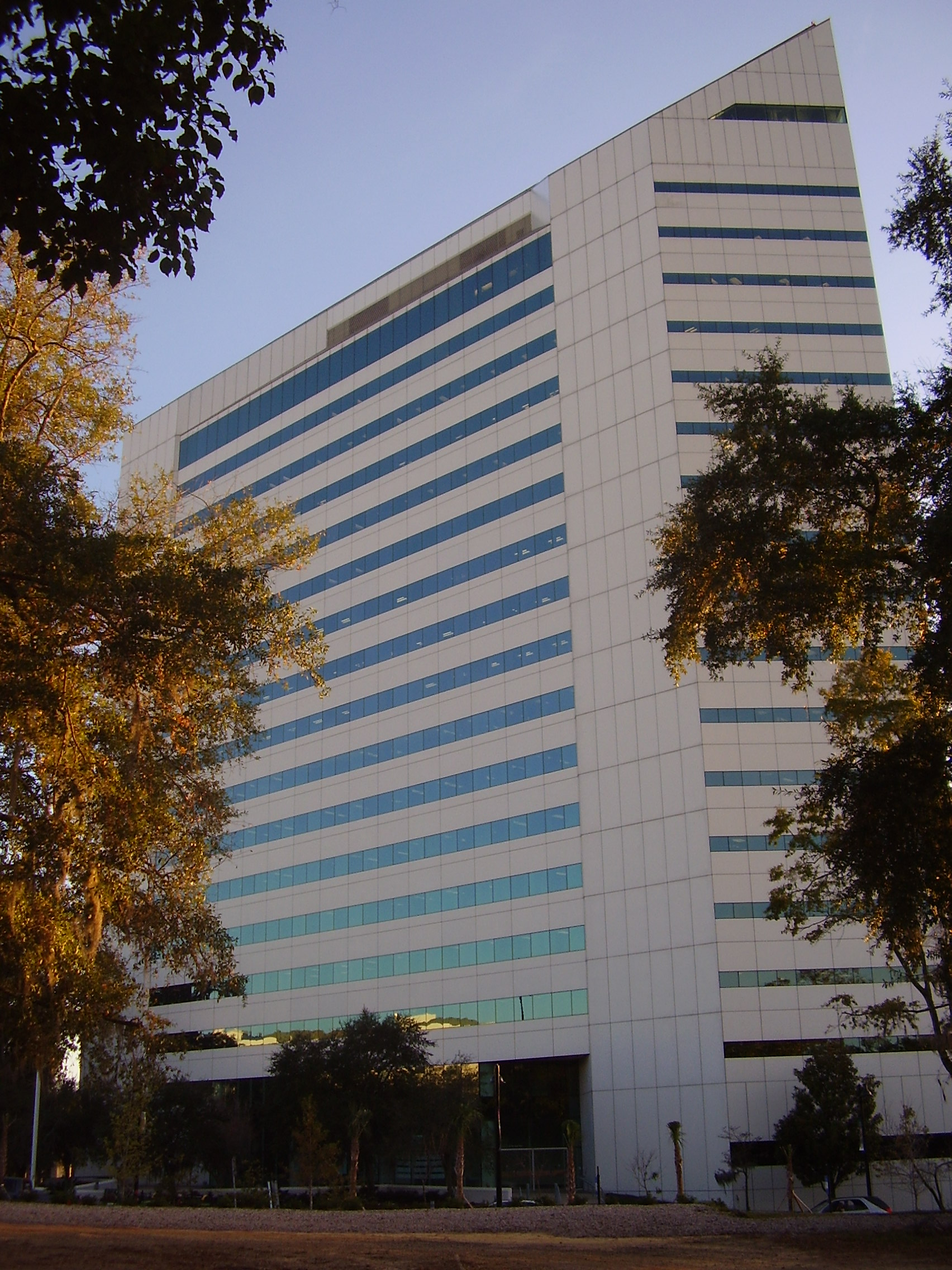
The Turlington Building in Tallahassee, headquarters of the Department of Education

Florida is unique among U.S. states in having a strong cabinet-style government. Members of the Florida Cabinet are independently elected, and have equal footing with the governor on issues under the Cabinet's jurisdiction. The Cabinet consists of the attorney general, the commissioner of agriculture, and the chief financial officer. Along with the governor, each member carries one vote in the decision-making process. In the event of a tie, the side of the governor is the prevailing side. Cabinet elections are held every four years, on even numbered years indivisible by four (for example, 2022 & 2026 are election years but 2024 & 2028 are not).

The Florida attorney general is the state's chief legal officer. As defined in the Florida Constitution, the attorney general appoints a statewide prosecutor who may prosecute violations of criminal law occurring in or affecting two or more judicial circuits. The attorney general is responsible for the Department of Legal Affairs. The attorney general is head of the Florida Department of Legal Affairs.

The Florida chief financial officer's duties include monitoring the state's finances and fiscal well-being, auditing and assuring that state programs are properly spending money and overseeing the proper management of the revenue and spending of the state. The chief financial officer is the head of the Florida Department of Financial Services (FDFS).

The Florida commissioner of agriculture is the head of the Florida Department of Agriculture and Consumer Services (FDACS).

=== Agencies and departments ===
The purpose of agencies is to promulgate rules to implement legislation. In April 2014, there were 25,362 administrative rules, and eight agencies have over 1,000 rules each, of which the most heavily regulated agencies are the Department of Financial Services and Department of Health. The Florida Administrative Register (FAR) is the daily publication containing proposed rules and notices of state agencies. The regulations are codified in the Florida Administrative Code (FAC). There are also numerous decisions, opinions and rulings of state agencies.

The state had about 122,000 employees in 2010.

== Legislative branch ==
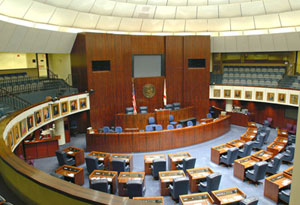
Chamber of the Florida Senate

The Florida Constitution mandates a bicameral state legislature, consisting of a Florida Senate of 40 members and a Florida House of Representatives of 120 members. The two bodies meet in the Florida State Capitol. The Florida House of Representative members serve for two-year terms, while Florida Senate members serve staggered four-year terms, with 20 senators up for election every two years. Members of both houses are term limited to serve a maximum of eight years. There are also state auditors led by the Florida auditor general who is appointed by the Joint Legislative Auditing Committee, the utility-regulating Florida Public Service Commission (FPSC), and the Florida Office of Program Policy Analysis and Government Accountability (OPPAGA).

The legislature's session is part-time, meeting for 60-day regular sessions annually. The regular session of the Florida Legislature commences on the first Tuesday after the first Monday in March with the governor's State of the State speech before a joint session and ends on the last Friday in April or the first Friday in May. The Florida Legislature often meets in special sessions, sometimes as many as a half dozen in a year, that are called for particular purposes, such as budget reduction or reforming property insurance. A special session may be called by the governor, by joint proclamation of the speaker of the House and senate president or by three-fifths vote of the members of both houses. Outside of these regular and special sessions, the members of both houses participate in county delegation meetings and interim committee meetings throughout the year, mostly from November to February in advance of the regular session.

Its session laws are compiled into the Laws of Florida, and the Florida Statutes are the codified statutory laws of the state which have general applicability.

== Judicial branch ==
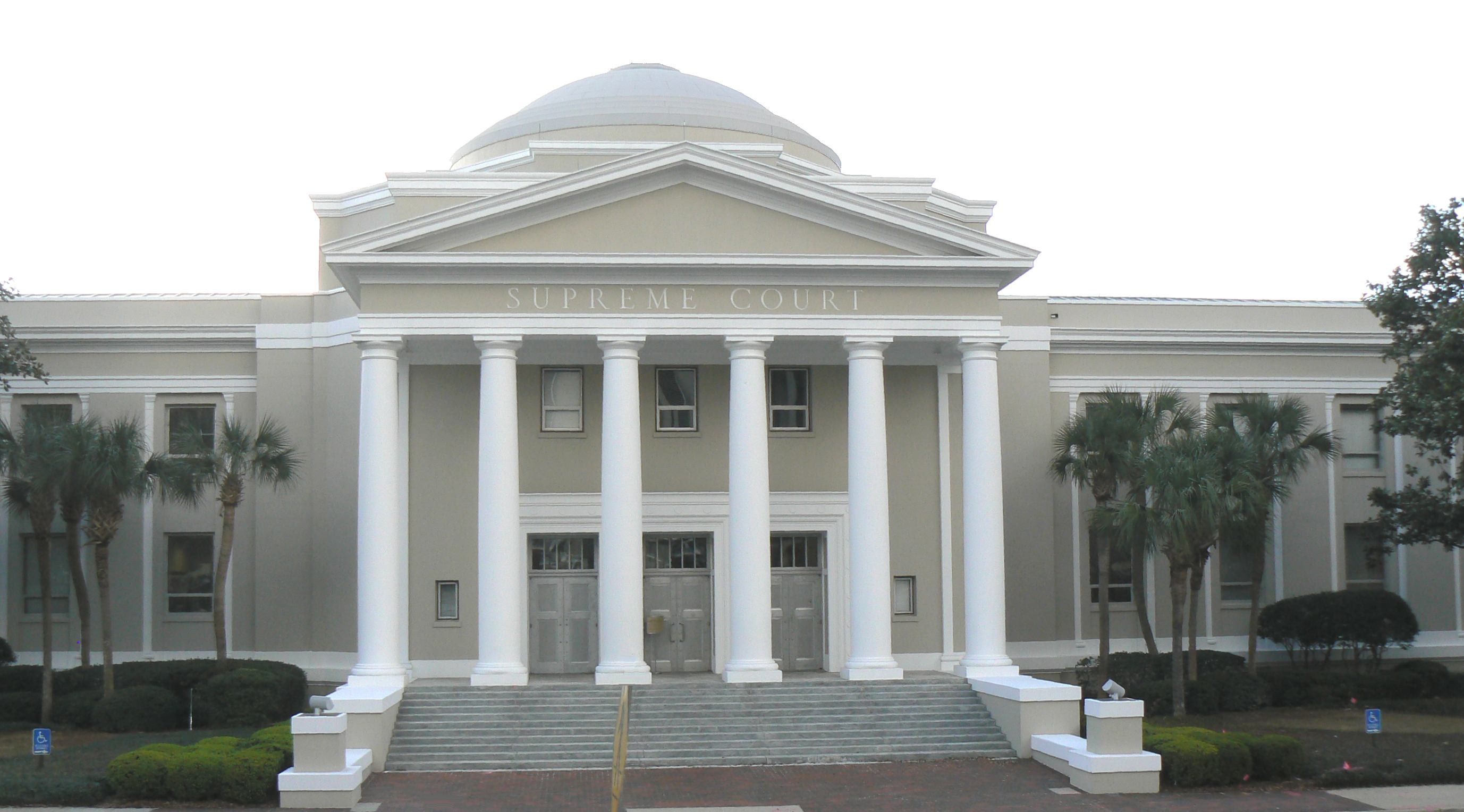
The Florida Supreme Court building in Tallahassee

The Florida State Courts System is the unified state court system. The Florida State Courts System consists of the:

- Florida Supreme Court, the state supreme court;
- five District Courts of Appeal, which are intermediate appellate courts; and
- two forms of trial courts: 20 circuit courts and 67 county courts, one for each of Florida counties.

The Supreme Court of Florida is the highest court of Florida and consists of seven judges: the chief justice and six justices. The Court is the final arbiter of Florida law, and its decisions are binding authority for all other state courts. The five Florida District Courts of Appeal are the intermediate appellate courts.

The 20 Florida circuit courts are trial courts of original jurisdiction for most controversies. The circuit courts primarily handle civil cases where the amount in controversy is greater than $15,000, and felony criminal cases, as well as appeals from county courts. Circuit courts also have jurisdiction over domestic relations, juvenile dependency, juvenile delinquency, and probate matters. The 67 Florida county courts have original jurisdiction over misdemeanor criminal cases, including violations of county and municipal ordinances, and in civil cases whose value in controversy does not exceed $15,000.

== Budget ==
Each civil entity has its budget: state, county, and municipal.

=== State ===
In June 2015, the state's debt was $25.7 billion. Also in 2015, Florida lawmakers were dealing with a record high state budget and were looking at $1 billion in suggested tax cuts.

== Capital city ==
The commissioners charged by the government of the unified Florida to select a permanent capital selected Tallahassee, then between the two major cities of Florida, Pensacola and Saint Augustine, as the state capital, in 1823. The White people expelled the Native Americans, who were opposed to leaving their land, before settling Tallahassee. The commissioners were W. H. Simmons, from St. Augustine, and John Lee Williams, from Pensacola. Richard Keith Call and a founder of Jacksonville, John Bellamy, wanted the capital in what is now Lake County but their efforts failed.

From the beginning of Tallahassee's history there were multiple attempts to move the state capital. A July 1957 Florida Historical Quarterly article stated that this was because of Tallahassee's distance from other settlements.

As Florida's size and population grew and spread south, the center of the state's population and the geographic center of the state changed. Using data from the 2010 U.S. census, according to the Florida Bureau of Economic and Business Research, the state's center of population was southern Polk County. The geographic center of the state is Brooksville. Because Tallahassee became increasingly far from many Floridians, there were additional proposals to move the capital to Orlando, a more centrally located city, in the late 1960s. The City of Orlando, in 1967, passed a referendum stating that it would accept becoming the capital. These proposals stopped after the new Florida Capitol opened in Tallahassee in 1977. Politicians from North Florida had opposed the idea of moving the state capital. Adam C. Smith of the Tampa Bay Times argued in 2016 that Tallahassee is no longer an appropriate location for the capital, and he cited an American Economic Review article that stated that state capitals far from their populations are more prone to corruption than those that are not.

== Local government ==
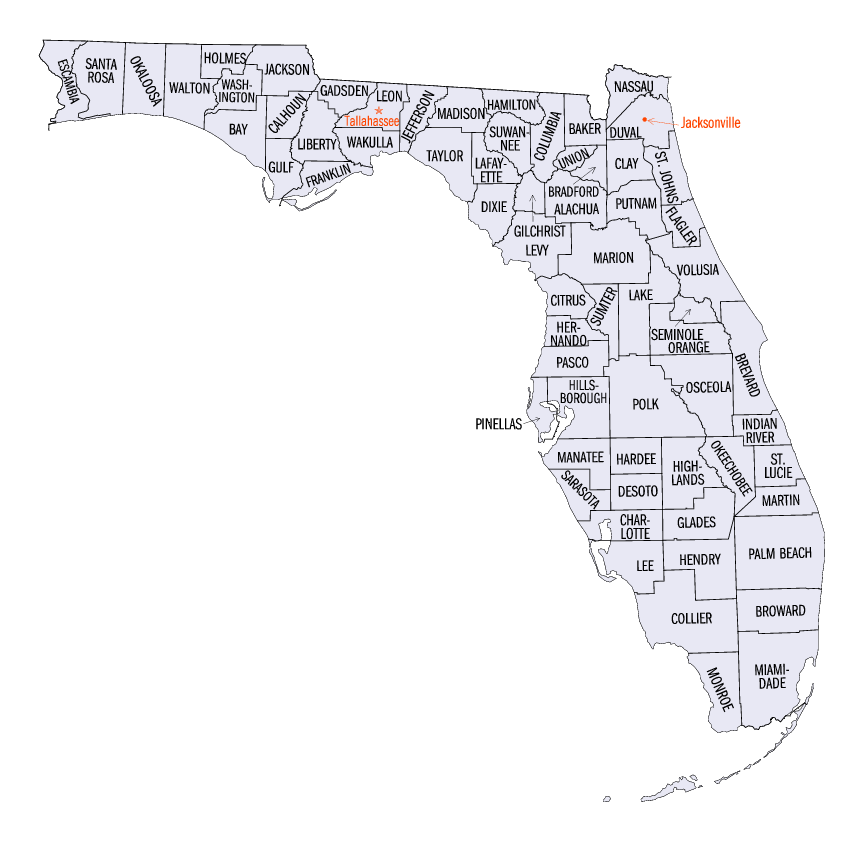
A map of Florida showing county names and boundaries

There are four types of local governments in Florida: counties, municipalities, school districts, and special districts.

Florida consists of 67 counties. Each county has officers considered "state" officers: these officials are elected locally, and their salaries and office expenses are also paid locally, but they cannot be removed from office or replaced locally, but only by the governor. The state officers subject to this requirement are the sheriff, state's attorney, public defender, tax collector, supervisor of elections, clerk of the circuit court (though styled as such, each circuit having multiple counties within its jurisdiction has a separate elected clerk within each county, and the office also handles official county records not pertaining to judicial matters), property appraiser, and judges.

There is one school district for each county; the Florida Constitution allows adjoining counties to merge their districts upon voter approval. The superintendent is by default an elected official; however, the Florida Constitution allows county voters to make the position an appointed one.

Municipalities in Florida may be called towns, cities, or villages, but there is no legal distinction between the different terms. Municipalities often have police departments, and fire departments, and provide essential services such as water, waste collection, etc. In unincorporated areas of a county, the county itself can provide some of these services. Municipalities may also enter agreements with the county to have the county provide certain services. Each county has a sheriff who also tends to have concurrent jurisdiction with municipal police departments.

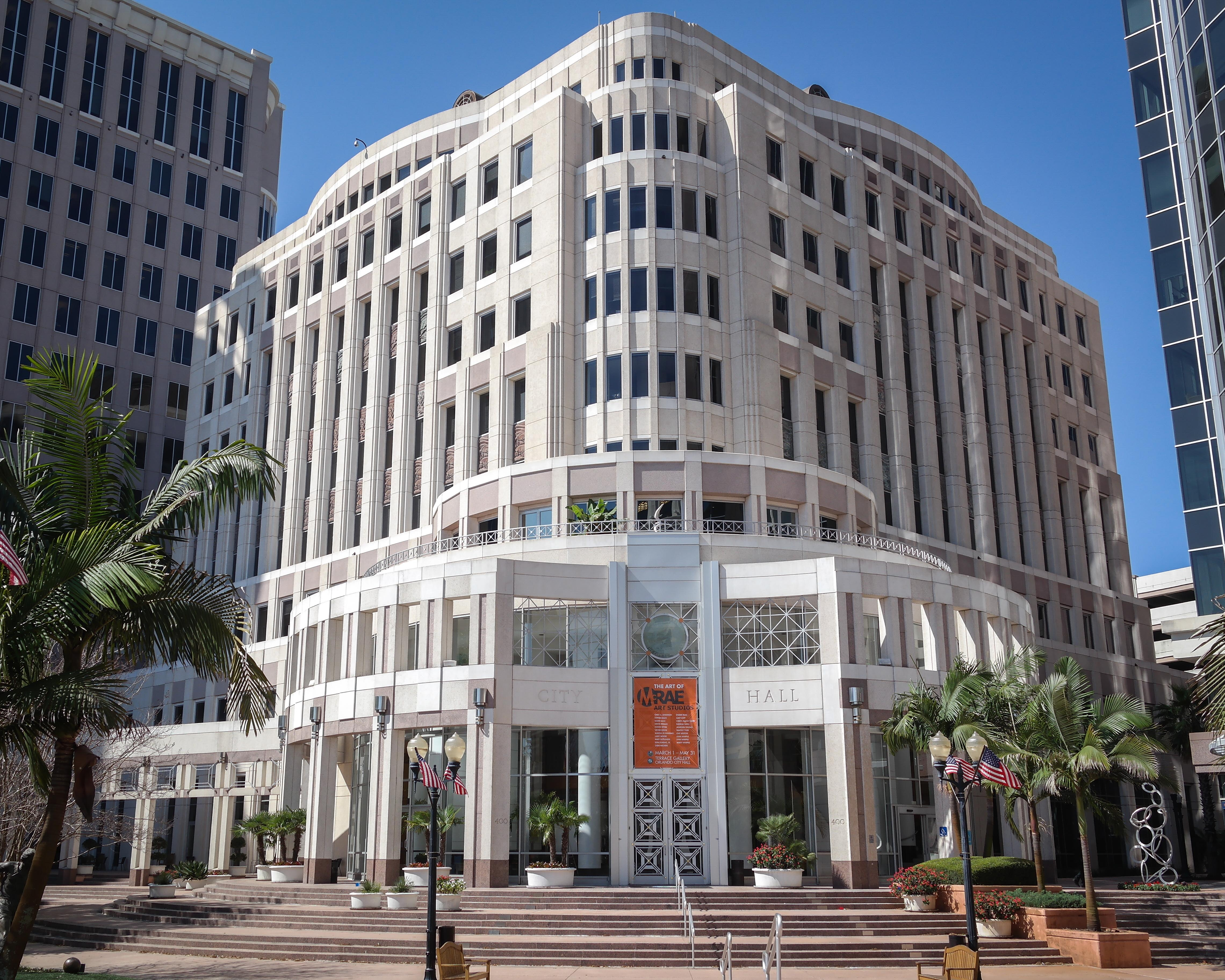
Orlando City Hall

Both counties and cities may have a legislative branch (commissions or councils) and executive branch (mayor or manager) and local police, but violations are brought before a county court. Counties and municipalities are authorized to pass laws (ordinances), levy taxes, and provide public services within their jurisdictions. All areas of Florida are located within a county, but only some areas have been incorporated into municipalities. All municipalities are located within a county and the county jurisdiction overlays the municipal jurisdiction. Usually, if there is a conflict between a county ordinance and a municipal ordinance, the municipal ordinance has precedence within the municipality's borders; however, the overlaying county's ordinances have precedence if the overlaying county has been designated a charter county by the Florida Legislature.

In some cases, the municipal and county governments have merged into a consolidated government. However, smaller municipal governments can be created inside of a consolidated municipality/county. In Jacksonville, the municipal government has taken over the responsibilities normally given to the county government, Duval County, and smaller municipalities that exist within it.

Among special districts are "community development districts" which have virtually all the power of a city or county (except, notably, they do not have police power). Chapter 190 of the Florida Statutes governs these districts. Notable CDD's include the Reedy Creek Improvement District (the location of Walt Disney World) and substantially all of the Villages (the giant Central Florida retirement community).

Many counties have a "Soil and Water Conservation District," a residue of Dust Bowl politics. Elected officials are unpaid. Much of their budget is spent on engineering staff. Critics are trying to dismantle these districts, as being obsolete.

== See also ==
- Administrative divisions of Florida
- List of counties in Florida
- Elections in Florida
- Florida Democratic Party
- Law of Florida
- Politics of Florida
- Political party strength in Florida
- Republican Party of Florida
- Surface Water Improvement and Management Program
