= Landon T. Ross Jr. =

American environmental biologist (1942–2016)

- Born: Landon Timmonds Ross Jr. October 19, 1942
- Died: February 7, 2016 (aged 73)
- Education: Florida State University (PhD); Harvard University
- Occupation: Environmental biologist

Landon Timmonds Ross Jr. (October 19, 1942 – February 7, 2016) was an American environmental biologist. He received master's degrees in geology from Florida State University (FSU master's thesis) and paleontology (Harvard University), and a biology Ph.D. from Florida State (FSU doctoral dissertation), while studying malacology there.

Ross spent his career, between 1970 and 2000, employed as an environmental biologist: as lead biologist with the state of Florida agency regulating the environment (Pollution Control, Environmental Regulation), or as central biology laboratory leader (Environmental Protection). His scientific contributions cover a relatively wide range of subjects, mostly related to Florida's environment.

== Publications available on-line (partial list) ==
- Florida Dept. Environmental Regulation, Tech. Ser. 10(1) 48pp (1990) "Methods for Aquatic Biology"
- Hydrobiologia 71(1–2): 51-60 (with co-authors) (1980) "Diel variations of selected physico-chemical parameters in Lake Kissimmee, Florida"
- Nautilus 78(2): 50-52 (1964) "The Land Mollusks of Siesta Key, Sarasota County, Florida"
