= Florida Caverns State Park =

State park in Florida, United States

- View of stalactites and stalagmites in the caverns

- Location within Florida Location within the United States
- Interactive map of Florida Caverns State Park
- Location: Jackson County, Florida, USA
- Nearest city: Marianna, Florida
- Coordinates: 30°48′50″N 85°13′59″W
- Area: 1,449.60 acres (586.63 ha)
- Established: October 11, 1935; 90 years ago
- Visitors: 132,403 (in FY 2022-23)
- Governing body: Florida Department of Environmental Protection

U.S. National Natural Landmark
- Designated: 1977

Florida Caverns State Park is a 1,449.60-acre (586.63 ha) (Note: The July 2026 Jurisdiction Report gives the park's area as 1,449.60 acres, based on GIS data; the 2018 management plan gives 1,449.56 acres, and the park's website describes it as a 1,500-acre park.) Florida state park on the Chipola River in Jackson County, Florida, about 3 miles (4.8 km) north of Marianna. It is the only state park in Florida that offers guided tours through a dry cave system. During the tour, visitors can see stalactites, stalagmites, columns and flowstone. The park protects more than 30 named caves in the karst landscape of the Marianna Lowlands. The National Park Service designated part of it a National Natural Landmark in 1977, and the Florida Geological Survey named it a State Geological Site in 2000.

The caves formed in limestone laid down in a shallow sea during the Late Eocene, about 38 million years ago, but the passages themselves are much younger. They were dissolved as the Chipola cut its valley deeper and the water table fell, and were later decorated with calcite deposited by seeping rainwater. The river partly disappears underground at the River Sink, and Blue Hole Spring, a second-magnitude spring, feeds a swimming area in the park.

The park's limestone bluffs, hardwood slopes and floodplain support plants otherwise associated with the southern Appalachian Mountains, along with some of Florida's few protected upland glades, a critically imperiled habitat. Its caves shelter the Georgia blind salamander and the Dougherty Plain cave crayfish, and Old Indian Cave was long Florida's main winter roost of the federally endangered gray bat.

People have used the area for at least 5,000 years, and Andrew Jackson's army crossed the Chipola's natural bridge in 1818. The state bought the first land for the park in 1935. The Civilian Conservation Corps then developed the tour cave, roads, trails and a limestone visitor center, and the park officially opened in 1942. Hurricane Michael destroyed most of the park's trees in 2018 and closed the caves for nine months. Besides cave tours, the park offers camping, hiking, horseback riding, paddling on the Chipola and swimming at Blue Hole.

== History ==
=== Early history ===
People have used the land now within the park for at least 5,000 years, and 24 archaeological sites had been recorded there as of 2018, although the park has never been systematically surveyed. The first excavations took place in 1940, after park construction turned up pottery at a parking area, a rock shelter and two caves. Analyzing the finds in 1949, the archaeologist Ripley P. Bullen identified two occupations. The earlier one, possibly Deptford or early Santa Rosa-Swift Creek, was at the rock shelter. The later one was a small Fort Walton village. He found no evidence that anyone had lived in the caves, and concluded that the villagers had dug pottery clay from them, leaving barefoot footprints in the clay floor of one cave.

According to a Florida Geological Survey guide to the park, first written in 1949, the earliest written account of the caverns is by Friar Barreda. Barreda crossed the area with a Spanish expedition to Pensacola Bay in 1693 and described spending a night in a rock hollow large enough to shelter more than 200 men. In 1818, during the First Seminole War, Andrew Jackson's army crossed the Chipola River at the park's natural bridge, where the river sank underground. Jackson's topographer, Captain Hugh Young, recorded the bridge as a narrow passage in the middle of a swamp about a mile wide. Local tradition holds that Native Americans hid from Jackson's troops in the caves, and that women, children and enslaved people sheltered there during the Battle of Marianna in the Civil War. In the 19th century a log run was cut through the natural bridge to float timber to a sawmill. The foundation and dam of Carter's Mill, a gristmill, still exist on the Blue Hole spring run.

=== State acquisition and the CCC ===
In the early 1930s the Marianna Cavern Association and the city's chamber of commerce sought to develop Indian Cave as a tourist attraction, and asked for a Civilian Conservation Corps (CCC) camp to supply the labor. The Florida Board of Forestry bought the first 307.47 acres (124.43 ha) from Florida Caverns, Inc., on October 11, 1935, and the park became one of nine Florida state parks built with New Deal labor. Early work was limited, and included a camp of African American enrollees stationed at the park from 1937 to 1938. A full CCC company of 200 enrollees arrived in July 1938.

Within months, the National Park Service geologist Oliver Chalifoux crawled through a sinkhole and found a richly decorated cave, and developing it for tours became the company's main project. Working largely with picks and shovels, enrollees enlarged its passages and removed mud to open it to visitors. They also built the park's roads, trails, picnic areas and limestone visitor center. The Works Progress Administration built a nine-hole golf course designed by Robert Trent Jones and a federal fish hatchery. The hatchery was abandoned soon afterward because the porous limestone beneath its ponds would not hold water. The caverns opened to the public in 1941, and the park was officially opened in 1942, the year the CCC camp closed after the United States entered World War II.

=== Later history ===
Like other Florida state parks, Florida Caverns was racially segregated until the late 1960s. Its former "Negro Picnic Area" was renamed the Beech picnic shelter. In 1969 the park closed Old Indian Cave to visitors, because human disturbance was driving down its bat population. The steel gates first installed also obstructed the bats, and they were replaced with fencing at the main entrance in 1982. The National Park Service designated 836 acres (338 ha) of the park as the Florida Caverns Natural Area, a National Natural Landmark, in 1977. The Florida Geological Survey designated the park a State Geological Site in 2000.

Hurricane Michael struck on October 10, 2018. According to the park manager, it destroyed about 90 percent of the park's trees and significantly damaged about 60 percent of its infrastructure. It also washed tons of sediment into the tour cave, which staff and volunteers cleared by hand. The caverns reopened on July 1, 2019. A 2022 amendment to the park's management plan proposed a campground and a mountain bike trail on the grounds of the golf course, which had closed in 2018.

== Caves ==
=== Formation ===
Visitors among stalagmites and columns on the cave tour

The caves are much younger than the rock that holds them. As the Chipola cut its valley deeper, the water table dropped in stages. Groundwater dissolved horizontal passages at each former water level, working along vertical joints and horizontal bedding planes in the limestone. Falling sea levels during the Pleistocene may have influenced the pace of this process. Most of the park's large passages follow a set of joints running about north-northwest, and a second, lower set at roughly right angles forms connecting passages. The Chipola runs in the same direction, which suggests the same fractures may guide the river. The largest single room in the park, the "Dragon's Belly" in Dragon's Tooth Cave, is about 135 by 55 by 20 feet (41.1 m × 16.8 m × 6.1 m).

Now above the water table, the passages are decorated by rainwater seeping through the roof rock and depositing calcite. The resulting speleothems range from stalactites, stalagmites and columns to flowstone, draperies and rimstone dams, with cave pearls and cave popcorn in places. Because this calcite is drawn from the roof itself, the large "bedpost" stalagmites found in several caves belong to the last phase of a cave's existence: the roof rock thins as it gives up its calcite, and will eventually collapse.

=== The Florida Cavern ===
Formations in the Florida Cavern under the tour lighting

The park's tour cave, the Florida Cavern, began as two separate caves; Civilian Conservation Corps workers cut a tunnel to connect them. The workers enlarged its passages by hand so that visitors could walk upright, and their chisel marks can still be seen. Its formations are abundant. In the northern part of the cave the roof is thin and riddled with openings, and heavy rain sends small waterfalls down into the passages. Tours use an LED lighting system intended to save energy and protect the cave's light-sensitive ecosystem. Artificial lighting encourages algae and moss to grow on the formations, and the park treats this growth periodically.

== Geology and climate ==
=== Physiography ===
The park lies near the center of the Marianna Lowlands, one of four physiographic provinces of the Florida Panhandle. It is a gently rolling landscape of sinkholes, springs, limestone bluffs and rocky streams. The lowlands are thought to have been carved by an earlier, more westerly course of the Chattahoochee and Flint rivers. The Apalachicola River later captured both, leaving the much smaller Chipola River to drain the area. The park also sits on the flank of the Chattahoochee Anticline, a broad upward fold in the rock layers that crests in Jackson County and brings Eocene and Oligocene limestone to the surface. Erosion has since removed much of the clay and sand that once covered the limestone, exposing it to karst processes. The result is some of the most striking karst terrain in Florida.

Most of the park lies in the Chipola's floodplain, at 65 to 75 feet (20 to 23 m) above sea level. The land rises to about 180 feet (55 m) on the park's eastern edge, and limestone cliffs and outcrops line the eastern side of the river valley. Twelve soil types have been mapped in the park. The Yonges-Herod association covers the floodplain, and Red Bay fine sandy loam is common on the higher ground.

=== Hydrology ===
Blue Hole Run from the bridge

The Chipola River, a tributary of the Apalachicola that rises in Houston County, Alabama, flows south through the park for about 1.9 miles (3.1 km). At the River Sink, measured at 96.5 feet (29.4 m) deep in 1999, part of the river's flow disappears underground. Before settlement, the river ran beneath a natural land bridge about half a mile long at this point. Spring floods can raise the river 10 feet (3.0 m) or more above its banks, covering over half the park and partly flooding the tour cave. Sugar Mill Run, an underground branch of the Chipola, appears at the surface only as a 3,000-foot (910 m) chain of sinkholes and short stream segments.

Blue Hole Spring, a second-magnitude artesian spring, discharged 56.8 cubic feet per second (1.61 m^{3}/s) when measured in August 1973. Its main pool is about 100 feet (30 m) across and 39 feet (12 m) deep, and its run, Carter's Mill Branch, flows about 1.6 miles (2.6 km) to the Chipola. The park's limestones form part of the Upper Floridan aquifer. Some caves act as windows into it, among them Salamander Pond Cave, whose underground lake rises and falls with the groundwater.

=== Climate ===
The park has a humid subtropical climate (Köppen Cfa), with hot, humid summers and mild winters. The nearest long-term weather station, at Marianna Municipal Airport about 3 miles (4.8 km) to the northeast, records an average annual temperature of 68.3 °F (20.2 °C) and about 51 inches (1,300 mm) of precipitation a year. Rain falls in every month; June, July and March are the wettest, and October is the driest.

Climate data for Marianna Municipal Airport, the nearest weather station (1991-2020 normals)
Month	Jan	Feb	Mar	Apr	May	Jun	Jul	Aug	Sep	Oct	Nov	Dec	Year
Mean daily maximum °F (°C)	62.9 (17.2)	67.1 (19.5)	73.7 (23.2)	80.1 (26.7)	87.5 (30.8)	91.2 (32.9)	92.4 (33.6)	91.4 (33.0)	88.7 (31.5)	81.1 (27.3)	71.7 (22.1)	64.7 (18.2)	79.4 (26.3)
Daily mean °F (°C)	51.8 (11.0)	55.4 (13.0)	61.5 (16.4)	67.6 (19.8)	75.9 (24.4)	81.1 (27.3)	82.7 (28.2)	82.1 (27.8)	78.7 (25.9)	69.5 (20.8)	59.6 (15.3)	53.9 (12.2)	68.3 (20.2)
Mean daily minimum °F (°C)	40.7 (4.8)	43.8 (6.6)	49.2 (9.6)	55.1 (12.8)	64.2 (17.9)	71.1 (21.7)	73.0 (22.8)	72.8 (22.7)	68.6 (20.3)	58.0 (14.4)	47.4 (8.6)	43.0 (6.1)	57.2 (14.0)
Average precipitation inches (mm)	4.04 (103)	4.49 (114)	5.01 (127)	3.72 (94)	3.15 (80)	5.07 (129)	5.10 (130)	4.93 (125)	4.06 (103)	3.06 (78)	3.67 (93)	4.81 (122)	51.11 (1,298)
Source: NOAA

== Ecology ==
=== Flora ===
Columbine flowering near the cave entrance

The park is a hotspot of rare plants in Florida, including several known almost nowhere else in the state. The Florida Natural Areas Inventory (FNAI) recognizes ten natural communities in the park. The largest are upland mixed woodland (444.34 acres (179.82 ha)), bottomland forest (313.63 acres (126.92 ha)), alluvial forest (257.43 acres (104.18 ha)), limestone outcrop (123.39 acres (49.93 ha)) and upland hardwood forest (111.98 acres (45.32 ha)).

Upland hardwood forest grows on the slopes above the limestone outcrops, beginning at about 80 feet (24 m) above sea level. Its trees include American beech, southern magnolia, red buckeye, basswood, white ash, black walnut, swamp chestnut oak, spruce pine and needle palm. The park's stand is notable for plants of the southern Appalachians that persist near the outcrops, among them two trilliums, mayapple, bloodroot, Allegheny spurge and fen rue. Upland hardwood forests in the Panhandle generally support several herbs more common farther north. Only about 3 percent of the community's original extent in Florida is in conservation ownership.

The limestone outcrops form an abrupt transition between the floodplain and the forested uplands, with steep cliffs, rock faces and cave entrances. Black walnut, white ash, oakleaf hydrangea, columbine and false rue-anemone grow there among many mosses, liverworts and spleenworts. The FNAI ranks the community as globally and state imperiled. It notes the Marianna columbine (Aquilegia canadensis var. australis), found only in the central Panhandle, among the outcrops' rare plants.

The park's three small upland glades are grassy openings on thin, chalky soil over limestone. Plants there include black bogrush, little bluestem, pinnate prairie coneflower, false aloe and azure blue sage. Upland glade is among Florida's most endangered habitats. It is ranked critically imperiled both globally and in the state; only about 40 acres (16 ha) of it are known to remain in Florida, and less than 2 acres (0.81 ha) of that is protected. Without fire, trees invade the glades, so the park burns them every five to ten years.

On the floodplain, the bottomland and alluvial forests flood every year, sometimes for a week or more. Large bald cypresses that escaped historic logging survive along the river and the Blue Hole run, alongside Ogeechee and water tupelo, water hickory, ironwood and spider lily. The upland pine forest, degraded by decades of fire suppression, is being restored with prescribed burning and longleaf pine planting. After fire was reintroduced, a population of Desmodium ochroleucum grew from about 10 plants to more than 1,000. Invasive plants, chiefly nandina and Chinese privet, had badly degraded the outcrop community before the 1990s. They have since been brought under control.

=== Fauna ===
Turtles seen on Blue Hole Run

The caves support animals adapted to life underground. Salamander Pond Cave, whose underground lake is a window into the aquifer, is the park's best example of an aquatic cave. It is home to two cave-dwelling species, the Dougherty Plain cave crayfish (Cambarus cryptodytes) and the Georgia blind salamander (Eurycea wallacei). The park's caves and the nearby Judge's Cave are the only protected localities in Florida for the salamander, which the Florida Fish and Wildlife Conservation Commission (FWC) lists as threatened. Biologists collected both species in the park's Pool Cave in 1970. The region also holds the only known terrestrial troglobites (land animals restricted to caves) in Florida. Two of them come from the park's Miller's Cave: the cave springtail Pseudosinella pecki, which was described from there, and an undescribed sheetweb spider of the genus Islandiana, which as of 1994 was known from nowhere else.

Four species of cave-roosting Myotis bats have been recorded in the park. The Indiana bat and the northern long-eared bat were collected in Old Indian Cave in the 1950s at the southern edge of their ranges, but have not been seen in recent years. The southeastern myotis is the most common: about 3,000 typically winter in Old Indian Cave, and up to 13,000 have been counted leaving it in the fall. The cave was also Florida's main winter roost of the gray bat, which the FWC lists as federally endangered; the only other known hibernation site in the state is Dugong Cave, just south of the park boundary. Thousands of gray bats hibernated there before 1960. Their numbers fell to none by about 1975 and recovered to an estimated 600 in 1988. From 2002 to 2011 fewer than ten were counted each year, and none have been recorded since. Biologists judged the recent decline unlikely to be caused by human disturbance, and suggested that the bats may have moved to larger caves in Alabama and Tennessee.

The Chipola River and Sugar Mill Run within the park hold at least two federally endangered freshwater mussels. Barbour's map turtle and the Suwannee cooter also live in the river. Fox squirrels are common in the park's open areas. Jackson County lies where the ranges of Sherman's fox squirrel and its western relatives meet, and it is unclear which form the park's squirrels belong to. Non-native animals in the park include feral hogs, feral cats, armadillos and coyotes.

== Recreation ==
The boat/canoe landing at midday

The park's main attraction is the guided tour of the Florida Cavern, offered daily. Tickets are sold at the gift shop on a first-come, first-served basis, and tours can sell out on weekends and holidays. The visitor center houses a museum with interpretive exhibits.

The Bluff and Beech Magnolia hiking trails, developed by the CCC, pass rock outcrops and Appalachian plant species. Tunnel Cave, along the floodplain nature trail, is open for self-guided exploration. Two multiuse trails are open to hikers, cyclists and horseback riders: the Sinkhole Trail (1.1 miles (1.8 km)) and the strenuous Bumpnose Trail (6.8 miles (10.9 km)), which crosses a remote part of the park.

Blue Hole Spring is open for swimming, without lifeguards, and may close when the Chipola floods. A boat ramp near the entrance serves as a launch for small boats, canoes and kayaks on the river, where herons, egrets, alligators and beavers can be seen. The park has 38 campsites: 32 in the Blue Hole campground, and six in an equestrian camping area with a stable. It also has four picnic areas.

=== Visitor information ===
As of 2026, the park is open daily from 8:00 a.m. to sunset, and admission is $5 per vehicle. Cave tours run daily from 9:00 a.m. to 4:00 p.m. Central Time, except on scheduled maintenance days. Tours cost $16 for visitors 13 and older and $9 for children aged 3 to 12; children 2 and under are free.
