= Florida's Hazelhurst terrace and shoreline =

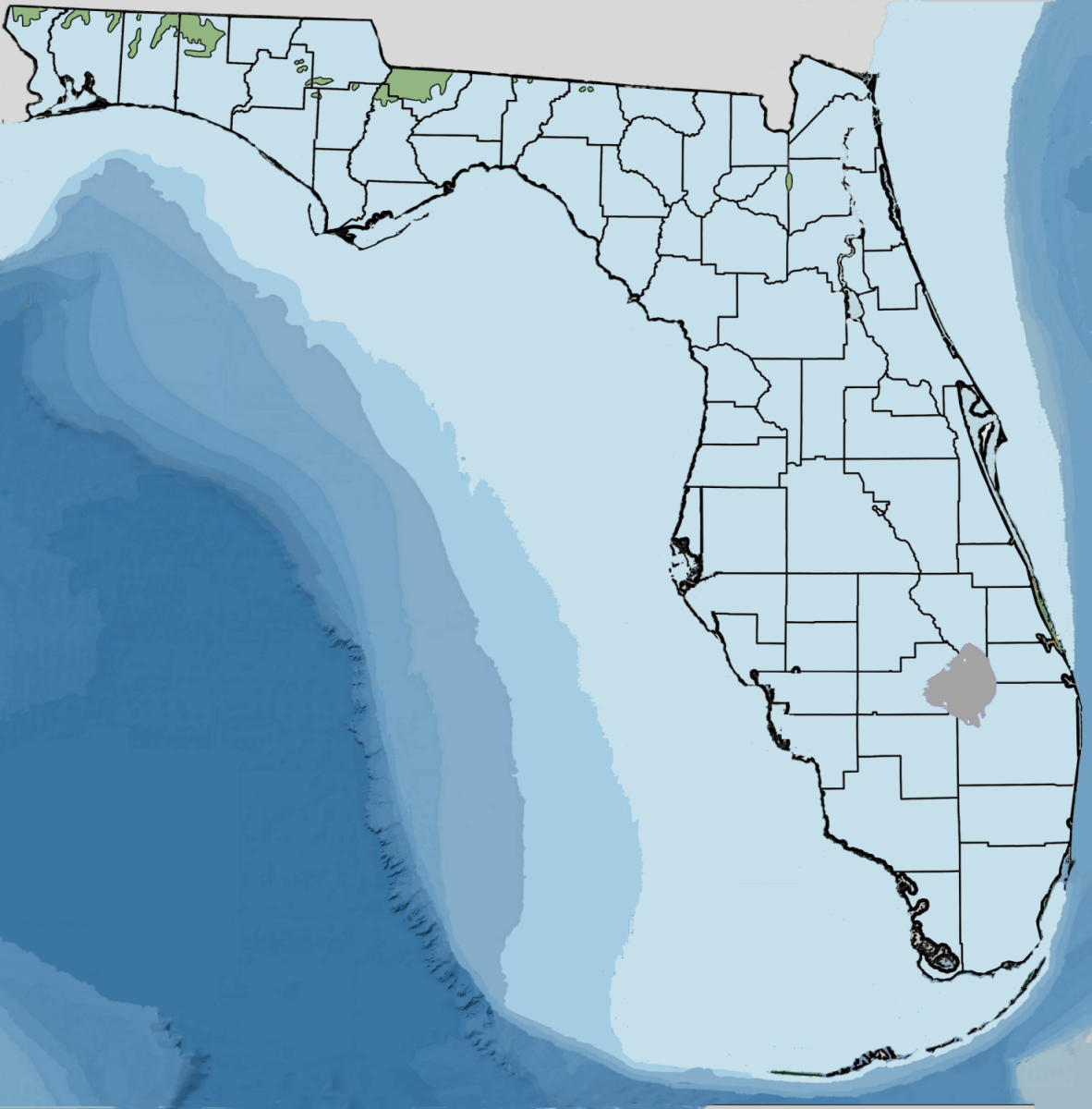
Florida map depicting landmass in green belonging to the Hazelhurst deposits of the Miocene or Pliocene epochs.

Florida's Hazelhurst terrace and shoreline (formerly the Brandywine) is an ancient relict shoreline or delta present in the southeastern United States's Atlantic seaboard dating from the Late Miocene to Early Pliocene (~11.0 to 7.0 Ma—3.6 to 2.88 Ma).

== Entomology ==
The name Hazelhurst was assigned by Dr. C. Wythe Cooke of the Florida Geographical Survey after previously calling it the Brandywine after the Brandywine deposits in Prince George's County, Maryland. and includes the geographic features of R. O. Vernon's Coastwise delta plain as well as MacNeil's high Pliocene marine terrace. Deposits are found between 97 and 65.5 meters (318 and 215 ft) above mean sea level.

== Creation ==
The Hazelhurst was created during the Late Miocene or Early Pliocene periods and not during the Pleistocene interstadial events according to geologists MacNeil, Yon, Hendry, and Vernon. Their argument for late Miocene or early Pliocene origin is the absence of scarps on the Hazelhurst's upper edges. MacNeil et al., do point to the presence of deposition from river deltas. Though not a shoreline and terrace according to these geologists, it is included within the mapping by the Florida Geological Survey's terraces and shorelines as a geological marker for marine presence.

The Hazelhurst exists in many Florida panhandle counties west to east. What would be Gadsden and Liberty County, Florida in particular had a very large landmass not only created by rising and lowering sea levels, but from depositions from the Apalachicola River on Gadsden's west side. This high ground is within the Tifton/Tallahassee Uplands.

Other counties with substantial landmass are Escambia (Perdido River), Santa Rosa (Black River), Okaloosa (Yellow River) and Walton, all within the Western Highlands.

East of the Florida panhandle, there are 2 small landmasses in northern Jefferson and 2 in northern Madison County (Tifton/Tallahassee Uplands). The border between the counties of Bradford and Clay shows a small area of Hazelhurst deposition (between 150 and 300 feet above MSL) and within the larger Trail Ridge rise, a designation by the Lake Bioassessment/Regionalization Initiative of the Florida Department of Environmental Regulation.
