= Florida Department of Environmental Protection =

Florida government agency

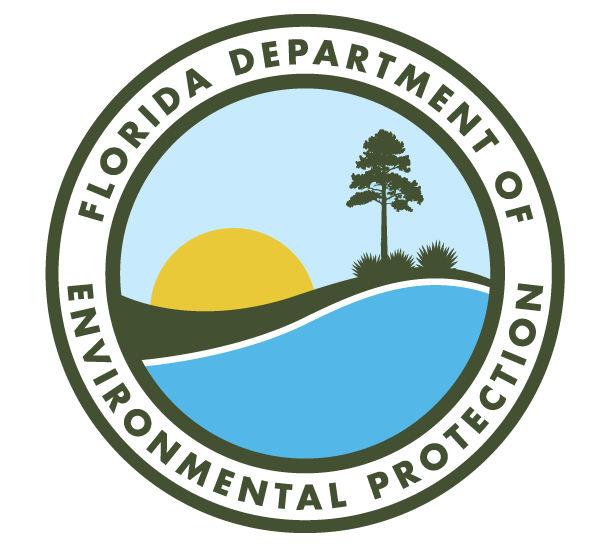

Agency overview
- Preceding agencies: ** Florida Department of Environmental Regulation; ** Florida Department of Natural Resources
- Jurisdiction: State of Florida
- Employees: 4200 (2021)
- Annual budget: US$1.44 billion (FY15–16)
- Agency executive: Alexis A. Lambert, Secretary
- Website: www.floridadep.gov

The Florida Department of Environmental Protection (FDEP) is the Florida government agency responsible for environmental protection, mainly working to improve the quality of the local environment and to further improve its qualities, to prevent pollution and when possible, initiate repairs of damage and reversal of harmful excess in all areas of Florida where it has full jurisdiction. The FDEP is a merge of a two past environmental agencies, the DER (Florida Department of Environmental Regulation) and the DNR (Florida Department of Natural Resources).

== History ==
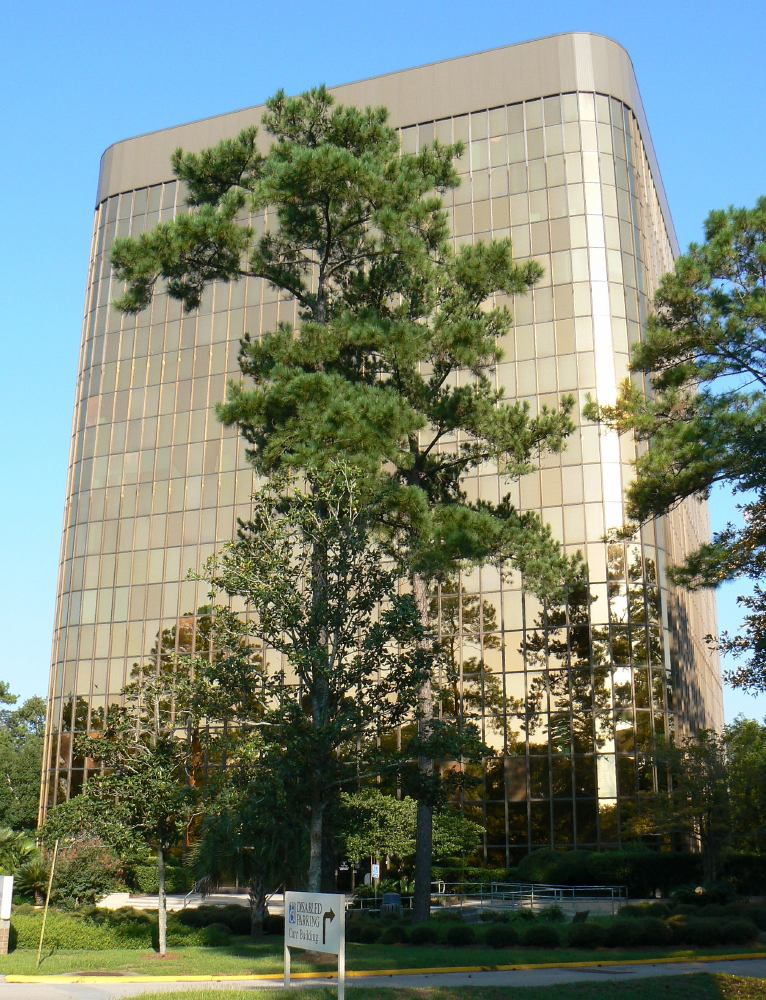
Marjory Stoneman Douglas Building in Tallahassee, the largest of the agency's headquarters buildings.

By the mid-1960s, when the federal government was becoming increasingly involved in initiatives designed to protect the country's environmental interests, Florida had four agencies involved with environmental protection: the Florida Board of Trustees of the Internal Improvement Trust Fund (state land, including shores, beaches, wetlands, and bodies of water), the Department of Health (sewage treatment, drinking water quality), Florida Department of Natural Resources (state parks and recreation areas), and Game and Freshwater Fish Commission (hunting and fishing).

In the late 1960s, the Florida Department of Air and Water Pollution Control was created under Governor Claude R. Kirk, Jr. Most staff were being taken from the Bureau of Sanitary Engineering of the state Department of Health. The name of the new agency was simplified to the Florida Department of Pollution Control.

In the mid-1970s, the Florida Department of Environmental Regulation (FDER) was created from the Department of Pollution Control and portions of the Board of Trustees of the Internal Improvement Trust Fund and the Florida Department of Natural Resources. This revised agency was entrusted with the quality of the state's air and water, and with making major land management decisions, primarily related to shorelines and wetlands.

The FDER began supervising five water management districts that had been established in 1972 under Chapter 373 of Florida Statutes to control all freshwater located in the state: The Suwannee River Water Management District, St. Johns River Water Management District, Southwest Florida Water Management District, South Florida Water Management District, and Northwest Florida Water Management District.

By 1992, it was the nation's third-largest such state agency, with 1,500 employees and a budget of $650 million. In 1993, the state merged the DER with the substantially larger Department of Natural Resources, creating the Florida Department of Environmental Protection. Ginger Wetherell was named Secretary of the new agency.

In 2004, it started the 'Southeast Florida Coral Reef Initiative', 6 years after a presidential order had instructed 7 states with reefs to develop roadmaps of conservation.

During the period from 2000 to 2005, the department functioned with a staff of about 3,600 employees and its annual budget averaged $1.9 billion ($1,899,731,705).

In 2011, DEP suspended its wetlands director "after she refused to approve a permit to a failed effort to sell off surplus park land" and Everglades scientists. Leading positions have been filled by prior consultants for developers and polluting industries in revolving door (politics). The regulatory climate has changed from "prosecuting violations to helping industry avoid fines".

=== Bureau of Park Patrol ===
Until July 1, 2012, the Florida Department of Environmental Protection (FDEP) had a law enforcement contingent, referred to as the Division of Law Enforcement (DLE), which included sworn state law enforcement officers and special agents as well as emergency responders to hazardous materials incidents.

The patrol bureau was divided into 4 districts: NE, NW, SE & SW. The approximately 90 sworn state officers assigned to the patrol bureau patrolled primarily state parks, state lands, state trails, wildlife management areas (WMAs), rivers, coastline and both the Atlantic and Gulf of Mexico. Officers utilized traditional patrol cars, 4x4 sport utility vehicles, pickup trucks, ATVs, boats, airboats, personal watercraft (PWC's), dirt-bikes, and bicycles. The headquarters occupied the fifth floor of the DEP main offices in the Marjory Stoneman Douglas building in Tallahassee, Florida. Officers of the patrol bureau were fully constituted law enforcement officers of the state and possessed statewide authority. Although dedicated primarily to the protection and conservation of state lands, parks, properties and bodies of water, officers took law enforcement action statewide.

On July 1, 2012, the Bureau, which by that time had been renamed the Bureau of Park Police, was merged into the Florida Fish and Wildlife Conservation Commission and the sworn officers, as well as reserve officers and support staff, were transferred to FWC. The Bureau of Emergency Response was not part of the merger and remained with DEP as the Office of Emergency Response.

=== Great Outdoors Initiative ===
As part of the Great Outdoors Initiative program, FDEP in August 2024 proposed several changes impacting nine state parks: Anastasia, Camp Helen, Dr. Von D. Mizell-Eula Johnson, Grayton Beach, Jonathan Dickinson, Hillsborough River, Honeymoon Island, Oleta River, and Topsail Hill Preserve. Among the proposed additions to state parks include cabins, hotels, golf courses, and pickleball courts. However, these plans generated significant controversy due to their potential environmental impacts, including opposition from U.S. senators Marco Rubio and Rick Scott; congressional representatives Kathy Castor, Matt Gaetz, Brian Mast, and Darren Soto; Florida Senate President Kathleen Passidomo; and many local officials.

== Functions and responsibilities ==
In its responsibilities for the state's natural environment, the department divides its function into numerous areas:

- As a regulatory agency, it regulates air pollution, water pollution, the use of wetlands and shorelines and the siting of hazardous waste facilities, power plants, and natural gas pipeline.
- It manages more than 10,000,000 acres (40,000 km^{2}) of state lands and 4,000,000 acres (16,000 km^{2}) of coastal uplands and submerged lands. Additionally, it oversees 176 Florida State Parks and recreation areas, greenways, trails, wildlife management areas and restores the environmental quality of the Everglades. The DEP is in charge of the Florida Reef system, from Biscayne National Park in Miami-Dade County to the St. Lucie Inlet in Martin County, with its Coral Reef Conservation Program.
- As a planning agency, it surveys the state's geological resources, looks after the management of water resources by the water management districts, controls Invasive species (particularly aquatic plants), monitors the environmental quality of the state and inspects the reclamation of mined lands.

The DEP has regulatory programs, which serve as actions to safeguard natural resources by administering permitting and compliance activities that protect air and water quality, and manage waste cleanups. This is headed by a Deputy Secretary for Regulatory Programs, where he manages a number of divisions in the DEP, like:

- Division of Air Resource Management : Which protects and manages Florida’s air resource, including air quality monitoring, permitting and compliance of emission sources.
- Division of Water Resource Management : Implements state laws that protect the quality of Florida’s water, rivers, lakes, estuaries and wetlands, and preservation of the state’s beach and dune systems.
- Division of Waste Management : Works to protect the environment from the improper handling and disposal of solid and hazardous wastes
- Florida Geological Survey : Collects, interprets and provides information about Florida’s water, mineral and energy resources.
- Division of Law Enforcement : Is responsible for enforcing the environmental laws and responding to incidents where environmental impacts are reported or discovered.
- Six regulatory district offices (located regionally throughout the state) : Which review permit applications, conduct inspections of permitted facilities, respond to reports of environmental damage, and conduct compliance assistance and enforcement activities.

=== Everglades Restoration ===
The Florida DEP office responsible for FDEP's overseeing of Everglades restoration—including the Everglades Forever Act and the Comprehensive Everglades Restoration Plan—is the Office of Ecosystem Projects. In its largest wetland acquisition in a decade, in January 2020, the Florida governor announced the Florida Department of Environmental Protection would purchase 20,000 acres of Everglades wetlands, ultimately with the intent of preventing oil drilling on that land.

=== Global warming ===
A 1998 presidential executive order created the U.S. Coral Reef Task Force. In 2002, Florida determined how to implement this at the state and county levels. After a meeting in 2002, the FDEP and the Florida Fish and Wildlife Conservation Commission formed a team of interagency marine resource professionals of all levels of US government, of scientists and other stakeholders. From May to November 2003, the Southeast Florida Coral Reef Initiative Team (SEFCRI Team) developed a local action strategy. In 2009, the FDEP's Coral Reef Conservation Program prepared a climate change action plan for the Florida Reef System 2010–2015, which was in sync with the federal NOAA Coral Reef Conservation Program Goals & Objectives 2010-2015.

After Governor Scott took office in 2011, DEP employees were informed by regional administrators not to use the terms climate change, global warming or sustainability in publications or educational materials, because the DEP was the governor's agency. The Florida Oceans and Coastal Council's Annual Research Plan 2014-15 avoided the term climate change and used 'climate drivers' and 'climate-driven changes' instead. Some critical employees were terminated or gave their notice during that time. Until 2015, the term sea-level rise was not permitted and had to be replaced with the term nuisance flooding.

== Budget and staff ==
Per Transparency Florida, in FY2025-26, DEP has an operating budget of roughly $3.3 billion and more than 3,125 employees.

The operating budget and staffing level for DEP has fluctuated through time. Notable decreases were experienced during the tenure of Governor Rick Scott (2011–2019) while notable budget increases were experienced during the tenure of Governor Ron DeSantis (2019-present).

| Fiscal Year | Operating Budget | Difference to prior year | Positions | Difference in employees |
|---|---|---|---|---|
| 2008-2009 | $1,879,610,539 | --- | 3,574.5 | --- |
| 2009-2010 | $1,383,891,108 | -$495,719,431 | 3,558.5 | -16.0 |
| 2010-2011 | $1,416,610,335 | +$32,719,227 | 3,551.5 | -7.0 |
| 2011–2012 | $1,416,473,517 | -$136,818 | 3,450.0 | -101.5 |
| 2012–2013 | $1,346,851,594 | -$69,621,923 | 3,226.5 | -223.5 |
| 2013–2014 | $1,204,642,420 | -$142,209,174 | 3,118.0 | -108.5 |
| 2014–2015 | $1,512,468,082 | +$307,825,662 | 3,095.0 | -23.0 |
| 2015–2016 | $1,408,732,680 | -$103,735,402 | 2,974.5 | -120.5 |
| 2016-2017 | $1,713,004,483 | +$304,271,803 | 2,937.5 | -37.0 |
| 2017-2018 | $1,505,690,048 | -$207,314,435 | 2,899.5 | -38.0 |
| 2018-2019 | $1,760,986,086 | +$255,296,038 | 2,888.5 | -11.0 |
| 2019-2020 | $1,858,801,797 | +$97,815,711 | 2,907.5 | 19.0 |
| 2020-2021 | $2,222,938,102 | +$364,136,305 | 2,917.5 | 10.0 |
| 2021-2022 | $3,337,302,125 | +$1,114,364,023 | 2,989.5 | 72.0 |
| 2022-2023 | $4,814,120,206 | +$1,476,818,081 | 3,087.5 | 98.0 |
| 2023-2024 | $5,236,542,779 | +$422,422,573 | 3,117.5 | 30.0 |
| 2024-2025 | $6,420,115,358 | +$1,183,572,579 | 3,166.5 | 49.0 |
| 2025-2026 | $3,286,085,636 | -$3,134,029,722 | 3,125.5 | -41.0 |

== Organization ==
=== FDEP Secretaries ===
| Name | Years in office | Appointed by |
|---|---|---|
| Ginger Wetherell | 1991-1998 | Lawton Chiles |
| David B. Struhs | 1999-2004 | Jeb Bush |
| Colleen M. Castille | 2004–2006 (Interim) | Jeb Bush |
| Mike Sole | 2006-2010 | Charlie Crist |
| Mimi Drew | 2010 (Interim) | Charlie Crist |
| Herschel T. Vinyard Jr. | 2011-2014 | Rick Scott |
| Jon Steverson | 2014-2017 | Rick Scott |
| Noah Valenstein | 2017-2021 | Rick Scott |
| Shawn Hamilton | 2021-2024 | Ron DeSantis |
| Alexis A. Lambert | 2024-present | Ron DeSantis |

As of 2006, the department divided itself into the following 13 offices based on function, all operating primarily out of Tallahassee:

Administrative Services, Air resource management, Coastal and Aquatic Managed Areas, General counsel, Greenways and Trails, Law Enforcement, Office of the Secretary, Recreation and Parks, Resource Assessment Management, Siting, State Lands, Waste management, Water resource management.

The FDEP divides the state into six districts with the following six district offices: Central District (Orlando), Northeast District (Jacksonville), Northwest District (Pensacola), South District (Fort Myers), Southeast District (West Palm Beach) and Southwest District (Tampa).

== See also ==
- Climate change in Florida
- List of law enforcement agencies in Florida
- Surface Water Improvement and Management Program
- Florida Wildlife Corridor
