= Civil procedure in the United States =

Civil procedure in the United States consists of rules that govern civil actions in the federal, state, and territorial court systems, and is distinct from the rules that govern criminal actions. Like much of American law, civil procedure is not reserved to the federal government in its Constitution. As a result, each state is free to operate its own system of civil procedure independent of her sister states and the federal court system.

== History ==
Early federal and state civil procedure in the United States was rather ad hoc and was based on traditional common law procedure but with much local variety. There were varying rules that governed different types of civil cases such as "actions" at law or "suits" in equity or in admiralty; these differences grew from the history of "law" and "equity" as separate court systems in English law. Even worse, discovery was generally unavailable in actions at law. In order to obtain discovery, a party to a legal action had to bring a collateral proceeding, a bill in equity in aid of discovery, just to obtain essential documents or testimony from the opposing party.

Procedure in the early federal courts was notoriously incoherent, and such incoherence persisted for almost 150 years. The Process Act of 1792 authorized the federal courts to write their own procedural rules for everything but actions at law. In the context of actions at law, the earlier Process Act of 1789 was so poorly written that it forced a federal court sitting in a state to apply the common law rules of pleading and procedure that were in effect in the state at the time it joined the Union, regardless of whether the state had modified or revised its civil procedure system since. In other words, even though a state's common law pleading system was always constantly evolving through case law, the federal courts in that state were frozen in time (a concept now known as "static conformity"). The Process Acts of 1789 and 1792 did not expressly address the problem of what procedural laws to apply in the federal courts in new states that joined the Union after the original Thirteen Colonies. In 1828, Congress enacted a law which stated that such courts would follow the civil procedure in effect at the time those states joined the Union.

Unfortunately for the federal courts, state civil procedure law began to diverge dramatically in the mid-19th century. In the 1840s, the law reformer David Dudley Field II launched a movement away from common law pleading and towards what came to be called "code pleading." Common law pleading operated under ad hoc procedures that developed haphazardly through case law—the forms of action. In other words, a particular procedure was followed just because some (often ancient) decision said so, but none of those decisions were looking at whether the entire procedural system made sense.

Because the evolution of the forms of action was severely limited by the Provisions of Oxford (1258), pleaders had to resort to awkward workarounds such as legal fictions which had become quite ludicrous by the 19th century. Legal fictions served only to obscure rather than illuminate what was truly at issue between the parties. For example, the traditional form of action for trover was originally intended for finders, keepers situations (i.e., the plaintiff accidentally lost some property, then the defendant found it and wrongfully kept it), but was gradually expanded to many other kinds of improper takings of others' property—which are now known as conversion. Thus, in an action for trover, "a plaintiff was expected to allege the casual loss and finding of, say, a thousand tons of pig-iron".

In contrast, code pleading was supposed to be carefully designed, at least in theory, with the entire lifecycle of a case in mind so that it would be simple, elegant, and logical, and was implemented by the enacting of a "code of civil procedure" by the state legislature. At common law, procedure came first and substance came second; code pleading flipped those priorities around and focused on the cause of action. By 1897, 27 states had enacted versions of the Field Code. As of that same year, common law pleading despite extensive statutory modifications remained the dominant procedure in 13 states, the Territory of New Mexico, and the District of Columbia. And seven more states had not enacted formal "codes of civil procedure", but had enacted "fairly complete statutory systems" which incorporated elements of both code pleading and common law pleading and in general were more analogous to the code pleading states. Some of the common law pleading states nominally retained the forms of action but declined to adopt code pleading because they had developed their own workarounds for the deficiencies of the common law. For example, Virginia developed its own unique system of "motion pleading", based on a "motion for judgment" which functions like a pleading.

Field is also credited with developing the very idea of "civil procedure" in American English, as referring to a single body of law governing the entire lifecycle of a civil action. Before him, an earlier generation of American lawyers like Joseph Story had always conceived of "pleading" and "practice" as two separate but related bodies of procedural law.

By the late 19th century, lawyers were becoming very frustrated with having to follow procedures that had been obsolete in their states for decades every time they litigated actions at law in federal courts. In response, Congress finally enacted the Conformity Act of 1872, which directed federal courts to conform their procedure in such actions to the current practice in the states in which they were sitting (i.e., "dynamic conformity"). Federal courts were allowed to continue to develop the federal common law of evidence (most of which was replaced a century later by the Federal Rules of Evidence).

However, allowing federal courts to conform to current state procedure still did not solve the federal courts' problems with actions at law, because by the turn of the 20th century, the U.S. was a mix of common law and code pleading states. Even worse, many code pleading states had merged common law and equity procedure into a unified civil procedure system, which directly clashed with the federal courts' preservation of the traditional English division between the two bodies of procedural law. The inevitable result was confusion and chaos in the federal courts, particularly as interstate commerce escalated with the Second Industrial Revolution and an increasing number of cases between citizens of different states were heard in federal courts under diversity jurisdiction. The glaring deficiencies in the Conformity Act, especially the assumption that a federal court would always sit in a U.S. state, caused severe problems in extraterritorial federal courts such as the United States Court for China.

=== Reform in the 1930s ===
Frustration with the status quo caused the American Bar Association to launch a nationwide movement for reform of federal civil procedure in 1911. After years of bitter infighting within the American bench and bar, the federal procedural reform movement culminated in the enactment of the Rules Enabling Act on June 19, 1934.

The Supreme Court at first took little interest in exercising the new powers granted to the Court by the Act. Then in January 1935, Charles Edward Clark, the dean of Yale Law School, published an article arguing that federal procedural reform had to include a full merger of law and equity, as had occurred in many code pleading states. This article in turn inspired U.S. Attorney General William D. Mitchell to write a letter to Chief Justice Charles Evans Hughes in favor of procedural reform. The Supreme Court appointed an Advisory Committee to draft what would become the Federal Rules of Civil Procedure (FRCP) on June 3, 1935. Mitchell was appointed as the Advisory Committee's first chairman (a position he would hold until his death in 1955) and Clark was appointed as the Committee's Reporter. The Advisory Committee's initial membership in 1935 included several prominent lawyers and politicians of the era, including George W. Wickersham, Armistead Mason Dobie, George Donworth, and Scott Loftin. Other prominent persons who were appointed later to the Advisory Committee included George W. Pepper, Samuel Marion Driver, and Maynard Pirsig.

The Advisory Committee first prepared two preliminary drafts for its own use, then eventually printed and circulated three drafts nationwide, in May 1936, April 1937, and November 1937. The third report was the final one, which the U.S. Supreme Court reviewed, revised, and adopted on December 20, 1937. There was significant opposition to the new rules in Congress and hearings were held by both House and Senate committees, but the Rules Enabling Act required Congress to affirmatively override the Supreme Court's adoption of rules pursuant to the Act. Congress recessed in June 1938 with neither house having taken a floor vote on the issue, and accordingly, the FRCP automatically went into effect on September 16, 1938. The Rules unified law and equity and replaced common law and code pleading with a uniform system of modern notice pleading in all federal courts. There are exceptions to the types of cases that the FRCP now control but they are few in number and somewhat esoteric (e.g., "prize proceedings in admiralty").

The FRCP drafters were heavily influenced by the elegance of civil procedure in certain code pleading states, particularly California and Minnesota. However, the FRCP went to a new system now called "notice pleading," based on the idea that a complaint should merely give "notice" that the defendant is being sued, and allow the plaintiff to use the machinery of the courts to compel discovery of evidence from the defendant which would help the plaintiff prove his case. And of course, the defendant could compel discovery of evidence from the plaintiff to support his defenses. The FRCP also introduced a number of innovations such as Rule 16 pretrial conferences, which gave judges a method for managing caseloads more aggressively and urging parties to reach settlements.

Having completed its initial task, the Advisory Committee survived for almost twenty years. In 1941, 1946, and 1948, the Supreme Court adopted the Committee's proposed revisions to the FRCP, but for reasons that were never disclosed, the Supreme Court never adopted the Committee's 1955 revisions, and discharged the Committee instead on October 1, 1956.

=== Modern ===
The ABA and numerous other groups lobbied for some kind of committee to take over the task of maintaining the FRCP and other federal procedural rules. In 1958, Congress amended the act creating the Judicial Conference of the United States so that it would have the power to advise the Supreme Court about revisions to procedural rules. The Judicial Conference then appointed a Standing Committee to handle that task, which in turn appointed an advisory committee for each set of federal procedural rules, including the FRCP. The initial members of the Advisory Committee on Civil Rules were appointed in April 1960; since then, that committee has been in charge of drafting revisions to the FRCP.

== Federal and state procedural uniformity ==
The American legal landscape is strewn with procedural reform efforts. There have been innumerable revisions to the FRCP, and to the nation’s state procedural rules, in the eighty years since promulgation of the FRCP. The resulting procedural diversity has been both valued and vilified. Various critics have disavowed the efficacy of procedural reform efforts. They have identified inherent anti-uniformity factors that should be embraced. A consequence of the above patchwork of historical imitations and amendments is the countless procedural differences between state and federal courts across the nation. Most practicing lawyers and judges are far too busy to focus on reforming the system where they have learned to function. There is precious little time to devote to individual consideration of whether another judicial system offers a better solution to the practice at hand. On their behalf, there are numerous state and federal entities–perhaps no more so than in California–that propose intra-system or single-subject changes from time to time. But there is no ‘‘go to’’ institution with the resources to routinely canvass differences between state and federal procedure within each state. There is no evolving national database that tracks this genre of state and federal variances.

An express objective of the early 20th-century reformers was to use the development of new federal procedural rules to facilitate uniformity of civil procedure in the separate states. By 1959, 17 states had adopted versions of the FRCP in part or whole as their civil procedure systems. Today, 35 states have adopted versions of the FRCP to govern civil procedure in their state court systems, although significant modifications were necessary because the federal courts are courts of limited jurisdiction, while state courts have general jurisdiction over innumerable types of matters that are usually beyond the jurisdiction of federal courts (traffic, family, probate, and so on). In supplementing the FRCP to provide a comprehensive set of rules appropriate to state law, several states took advantage of the opportunity to impose intrastate uniformity of civil procedure, thereby cutting down on the ability of trial court judges in rural areas to trip up big city lawyers with obscure local rules and forms, and in turn improving the portability of legal services. Even states that declined to adopt the FRCP, like California, also joined the movement towards intrastate uniformity of civil procedure.

=== Ambiguous details ===
One surviving legacy of the old Conformity Act is that the FRCP is still vague about certain procedural details. For example, Rules 7, 10, and 11 do not list all the documents that should be filed with a motion, nor do they contain a complete set of requirements for how they should be formatted, Rule 6 does not contain a complete motion briefing schedule (apart from the general requirement that a notice of motion and supporting motion papers must be filed and served at least 14 days ahead of the hearing), Rule 78 grants district courts broad discretion in scheduling the briefing and arguments of motions, and Rule 83 grants broad authority to district courts to promulgate local rules.

This compromise allowed each federal district court to supplement the FRCP by promulgating local rules which track traditional motion practice in their states to the extent compatible with the FRCP. But it also defeated the FRCP's objective of procedural uniformity. While virtually all U.S. lawyers understand the general principles of a FRCP 12(b)(6) motion to dismiss or a FRCP 56 motion for summary judgment, the actual details of making and opposing motions continue to vary dramatically from one federal district court to the next.

Variations include things like the formatting of court papers (including typeface, margins, line spacing, line numbers, and whether maximum length should be calculated in words or pages), whether a hearing date must be reserved in advance, whether the movant even gets a hearing for oral argument (some district courts assume that motions are to be heard unless expressly taken off calendar while in others there is no hearing unless expressly ordered), whether the briefing schedule is calculated from date of filing of motion papers or date of motion hearing, whether the motion papers must show evidence of a good faith attempt to confer with the opponent in advance to avoid unnecessary motion practice, and whether a "separate statement" summarizing the issues to be decided must be concurrently filed. District courts also vary widely in the extent to which local custom is actually codified to any extent in local rules, or in standing orders issued by individual district judges (which may be posted on Web sites or actually filed separately for each case), or simply not codified at all. In the last situation, out-of-town attorneys and pro se parties are at a severe disadvantage unless the district court's uncodified customs have been expressly documented in legal treatises, which is not always the case for smaller states.

Congress and the federal courts have recognized that this flaw in the FRCP drives up the cost of legal services and hinders the ability of lawyers to litigate in federal courts in other states, which in turn has become a justification in itself for restrictions on interstate practice. However, Congress has been unable to complete the unification of federal civil procedure in a fashion that would be satisfactory to judges and lawyers in all states.

=== Modern reform ===
A study of the federal district courts in the mid-1980s found that they had developed a broad range of approaches to filling in the critical gaps in the FRCP. These ranged from a single local rule in the Middle District of Georgia, to the 34 local rules of the Central District of California (which were loaded with so many subparts that they actually amounted to 434 local rules). The original version of the bill that became the Civil Justice Reform Act of 1990 included a clause that would have impliedly forced the federal judiciary to develop and adopt a truly comprehensive package of procedural rules that would be uniformly applied in all federal district courts. The draft bill encountered a frosty reception from judges and lawyers throughout the United States, as everyone feared that their own favorite local procedure might fall victim to such a standardization process.

The final version of the bill was heavily watered down so that it merely required all federal district courts to appoint committees of local attorneys and judges to study the possibility of reorganizing and simplifying their local rules. In the end, most but not all federal district courts restructured their local rules to follow a uniform format promulgated by the Judicial Conference of the United States, but they continued to maintain most of their unique local idiosyncrasies.

== Court rules or statutes ==
California, Illinois and New York are notable in that almost all of their sui generis civil procedure systems are codified in statutory law, not in rules promulgated by the state supreme court or the state bar association. The position taken by these states is that to protect the rights of the citizens of a representative democracy, civil procedure should be directly managed by legislators elected by the people on a frequent basis, not judges who are subject only to relatively infrequent retention elections (California) or direct elections (Illinois and New York). (All three states have strong traditions of popular sovereignty; they are among the minority of U.S. states whose enacting clauses and criminal prosecutions are done in the name of the people, rather than the state.) The other problem with having judges manage civil procedure rules is that they are usually too busy with their regular caseloads to directly draft new or amended rules themselves. As noted above, most of the real work is delegated to appointed advisory committees.

The opposite viewpoint, as represented by the FRCP and its state counterparts (this was also an express position of the federal civil procedure reform movement), is that civil procedure is a judicial function reserved to the judiciary under the rule of separation of powers; legislatures are often too congested and gridlocked to make timely amendments to civil procedure statutes (as evidenced by the chaos and delays surrounding the statutory adoption of the Federal Rules of Evidence); and many legislators are nonlawyers who do not understand the urgent need to constantly revise and improve civil procedure rules. Thus, the development of state statutory civil procedure law is often haphazard and chaotic.

Another reason for why many states have not adopted the FRCP is that they have borrowed, by occasional statutory acts, the most innovative parts of the FRCP for their civil procedure systems, while maintaining the general principle that the legislature should manage civil procedure. For example, the FRCP's liberal discovery rules heavily influenced the California Civil Discovery Act of 1957 as well as its subsequent replacements in 1986 and 2004. Thus, by fixing the most archaic and frustrating parts of their procedural systems, they have obviated the need for complete reform, which would also necessitate retraining all their lawyers and judges.

Confusingly, Kansas and North Carolina have "Rules of Civil Procedure" which are actually enacted statutes, not rules promulgated by their state supreme courts.

A few states have adopted the general principle that civil procedure should be established in court rules, not civil procedure statutes, but have refused to adopt the FRCP. For example, Rhode Island has its own Civil Court Rules of Procedure.

== Notable features ==
Generally, American civil procedure has several notable features, including extensive pretrial discovery, heavy reliance on live testimony obtained at deposition or elicited in front of a jury, and aggressive pretrial "law and motion" practice designed to result in a pretrial disposition (that is, summary judgment) or a settlement. U.S. courts pioneered the concept of the opt-out class action, by which the burden falls on class members to notify the court that they do not wish to be bound by the judgment, as opposed to opt-in class actions, where class members must join into the class. Another unique feature is the so-called American Rule under which parties generally bear their own attorneys' fees (as opposed to the English Rule of "loser pays"), though American legislators and courts have carved out numerous exceptions.

== Jurisdictions ==
=== State civil procedure rules or codes ===
Note that the following states do not have a single code or set of civil procedure rules for their trial courts: Delaware, Indiana, Maryland, New Hampshire, New Mexico, Rhode Island, and Washington.

- Alabama Rules of Civil Procedure
- Alaska Rules of Civil Procedure
- Arizona Rules of Civil Procedure
- Arkansas Rules of Civil Procedure
- California Code of Civil Procedure
- Colorado Rules of Civil Procedure
- Connecticut Practice Book
- Delaware civil procedure
- Florida Rules of Civil Procedure
- Georgia civil procedure (Official Code of Georgia Annotated, Title 9, Civil Practice)
- Hawaii Rules of Civil Procedure
- Idaho Rules of Civil Procedure
- Illinois Code of Civil Procedure
- Iowa Rules of Civil Procedure
- Kansas Rules of Civil Procedure (enacted as Article 2 of Chapter 60, K.S.A.)
- Kentucky Rules of Civil Procedure
- Louisiana Code of Civil Procedure
- Maine Rules of Civil Procedure
- Maryland civil procedure
- Massachusetts Rules of Civil Procedure
- Michigan civil procedure (Chapter 2, Michigan Court Rules)
- Minnesota Rules of Civil Procedure
- Mississippi Rules of Civil Procedure
- Missouri civil procedure (Rules 41 to 129 of the Missouri Supreme Court Rules)
- Montana civil procedure (Title 25, Montana Code Annotated)
- Nebraska civil procedure (Chapter 25, Nebraska Revised Statutes)
- Nevada Rules of Civil Procedure
- New Hampshire civil procedure
- New Jersey civil procedure (Part IV of the New Jersey Rules of Court)
- New Mexico civil procedure
- New York Civil Practice Law and Rules
- North Carolina Rules of Civil Procedure (enacted as Chapter 1A, North Carolina General Statutes)
- North Dakota Rules of Civil Procedure
- Ohio Rules of Civil Procedure
- Oklahoma civil procedure (Title 12, Oklahoma Statutes)
- Oregon Rules of Civil Procedure
- Pennsylvania Rules of Civil Procedure
- Rhode Island civil procedure
- South Carolina Rules of Civil Procedure
- South Dakota civil procedure (Chapter 15-6, South Dakota Codified Laws)
- Tennessee Rules of Civil Procedure
- Texas Rules of Civil Procedure
- Utah Rules of Civil Procedure
- Vermont Rules of Civil Procedure
- Virginia Civil Procedure (Part Three of the Rules of the Supreme Court of Virginia)
- Washington civil procedure
- West Virginia civil procedure
- Wisconsin civil procedure (Chapters 801 to 847, Wisconsin Statutes)
- Wyoming Rules of Civil Procedure

=== Federal district rules of civil procedure ===
- D.C. Superior Court Rules of Civil Procedure

=== Territorial civil procedure rules ===
- Guam Rules of Civil Procedure
- Puerto Rico Rules of Civil Procedure

== See also ==
- Civil procedure
