= Halo law =

A "Halo Law" is legislation in the United States that establishes a legal buffer zone prohibiting individuals from approaching within a specific distance (such as 15 or 25 feet) of law enforcement officers or first responders after being given a verbal warning to stay back.

Florida was the first state to enact a Halo Law (Senate Bill 184) on January 1, 2025, creating a 25-foot safety buffer around police, firefighters, and EMS personnel.

Similar buffer-zone or approach-restriction laws have been introduced or passed in states including Arizona, Indiana, Louisiana, Tennessee, and Kansas (which enacted a 25-foot rule).

Federal "Halo Act" bills (such as S.3179 and H.R.8796) have been introduced in the United States Congress by Senator Ashley Moody and Representative Nicole Malliotakis to create a federal 15- to 25-foot protection buffer zone carrying penalties of up to 5 years in prison for violations targeting federal or immigration enforcement officers.

Halo laws have not done well in American courts when challenged on First Amendment free-speech grounds or Fourteenth Amendment vagueness grounds.
