= Homestead exemption in Florida =

Housing law in the US state

The homestead exemption in Florida may refer to three different types of homestead exemptions under Florida law:

1. exemption from forced sale before and at death per Art. X, Section 4(a)-(b) of the Florida Constitution;
2. restrictions on devise and alienation, Art. X, Section 4(c) of the Florida Constitution;
3. and exemption from taxation per Art. VII, Section 6 of the Florida Constitution.

Florida's homestead exemption that provides an exemption from forced sale before and at death are among the most protective in the United States as it provides no limit to the value of certain real property that can be protected from creditors. The property tax exemption clause of Article VI renders property tax-free to the extent of certain dollar amounts in the value of the homestead.

The definition of a homestead is not necessarily co-extensive for Article X, Section 4(a)-(c) exemption purposes (exemption from creditors and restrictions on descent and distribution) and Article VI purposes (exemption from taxation). Both provisions apply automatically upon the establishment of a primary residence in Florida, but to reap the tax assessment benefits, the homestead exemption must be claimed by a filing with the local county property appraiser's office. Homestead can be lost if the homeowner abandons use of the real property as a homestead.

A fourth benefit, while not as clearly an exemption as the above three, is also accorded to one's homestead in Florida per Art. VII, Section 7 of the Florida Constitution. For tax purposes the year-to-year increase in assessed value of the homestead is limited to the lesser of 3% or the percentage change in the Consumer Price Index.

== Scope of the Debtor Protection ==
Florida's debtor protection homestead provision is one of the broadest in the United States. The value of the property that can be protected is unlimited, so long as the property occupies no more than one-half acre (2,000 sq m) within a municipality, or 160 acres (650,000 sq m) outside of a municipality. The provision is written into the Florida Constitution, Article X, section 4, so it cannot be removed without a constitutional amendment.

Because of the scope of the protection afforded, persons from other states with heavy debts or large court judgments against them have been known to purchase expensive estates in Florida, some examples being O. J. Simpson and Donald Trump. This strategy has been somewhat impaired by the 2005 Bankruptcy Code amendments.

One event that can drastically affect the value of a homestead is municipal incorporation. If a 160-acre (650,000 sq m) non-municipal homestead is on land that is later incorporated into a municipality, the homestead will be grandfathered in and remain protected for the owner and his heirs. However, for any future purchasers of all or part of the property, the protected land will drop to the one-half acre (2,000 sq m) allowed within a municipality.

== Protection from Creditors ==
The Florida Constitutional homestead exemption offers virtually absolute protection from forced sale to meet the demands of creditors, except under four special circumstances, and should not be confused with the Florida Ad Valorem tax reduction savings, which is a product of the Florida legislature.

One unique feature of Florida's homestead exemption is that it attaches to proceeds from the sale of a home if the homeowner intends to use those proceeds to establish a new Florida homestead within a reasonable time. Therefore, if the owner of a $1,000,000 home sells that home and puts the money in a bank account, that money is still protected by the homestead exemption, so long as the homeowner has a bona fide intent to use it to purchase another home in Florida entitled to the exemption within a reasonable period of time. This protection is lost if the funds are commingled with other funds not designated for such a purchase. Also, the protection only extends to the amount the owner intends to invest in a new homestead – if the owner of a $1,000,000 home sells that home, and makes clear his intent to purchase a $750,000 home, the remaining $250,000 will lose its protection. (Note: Florida Statute 222.25(4) provides that if the debtor does not claim or receive the benefits of a homestead exemption, the debtor may claim a $4,000 personal property exemption which is over and above the $1000 to which all debtors are entitled pursuant to Florida Statute 222.25(1).

Furthermore, under Florida's tax lien sale provision, liens of less than $250 on homestead properties cannot be sold to investors.

=== Exceptions for Certain Creditors ===
Four types of creditors can still force the sale of a homestead to collect debts owed to them. These are:

1. The State of Florida and its counties or municipalities, to collect past due property taxes (this also applies to investors holding tax lien certificates, but note the above prohibition against sale of small liens on homestead properties);
2. Parties to whom the property was specifically pledged as collateral for a mortgage;
3. Mechanics who are owed money for work performed in repairing or improving the property.
4. Any creditor with a lien that pre-dates the establishment of homestead. This usually includes condominium and mandatory homeowner association liens, depending on the language and age of the covenants.

Because the homestead exemption is a product of the Florida Constitution, it can also be overridden by the federal law due to the Supremacy Clause of the United States Constitution. Federal income tax liens are superior to the homestead protection provided by the Florida Constitution. The Internal Revenue Service's policy is to be reluctant to foreclose on taxpayer's homes to enforce these liens, often only being satisfied if the real property is sold or mortgaged before the tax lien expires.

Florida's Supreme Court recently held Florida's homestead exemption may be waived in the limited exception of a bankruptcy proceeding.

== Reduction of Ad Valorem Property Tax ==
The Great Depression began in 1929 and caused reforms in ad valorem property taxes in Florida. As the Depression deepened, many Florida property owners found themselves unable to pay their property taxes and in serious danger of losing their homes. In response to this problem, State Representative Dwight Rogers of Fort Lauderdale in 1933 proposed and passed legislation to place the $5,000 Homestead Exemption Amendment on the state ballot. Florida voters overwhelmingly approved the Homestead Exemption Amendment in 1934 (Article X, Section 7, as it was numbered before the 1968 Florida Constitutional re-write). The initial Homestead Exemption sought to ease the burden on homeowners by exempting property taxes on the first $5,000 of a homeowner's residence. The exemption was increased by the Florida Legislature to $10,000 during the 1960s, although this was not incorporated into the constitution. By Constitutional amendment adopted by a landslide in 1980, the exemption was increased to $25,000. On January 29, 2008, voters approved an increase to $50,000 for non-school assessments, which is incorporated in Florida Statute §196.031. The reduction contained in Florida Statutes should not be confused by the Florida Constitution homestead exemption which protects the homestead from forced sale except under certain circumstances.

Florida property tax homestead exemption reduces the value of a home for assessment of property taxes by $50,000, so a home that was actually worth $100,000 would be taxed as though it was worth only $50,000. However, the second $25,000 of homestead coverage does not apply to the school portion of property taxes, and only applies to the third $25,000 of a property's total value (i.e., that portion of a property's value between $50,000-$75,000).

Additionally, the Florida homestead exemption caps the rate at which property assessments may be increased annually. Though millage rates may be changed, the assessed value a house with a homestead exemption can be increased by is fixed. This is the result of the "Save Our Homes" Amendment to the Florida Constitution which was passed by voters in 1992, and went into effect in 1995. The amendment caps the increase of the assessed value of a home with a homestead exemption to the lesser of 3% or the rate of inflation. This means that if an owner had a homestead exemption on a home valued at $100,000 in 1995, and the exemption was still valid in 2005, the most the home could be assessed at is approximately $126,000 . For comparison, records of the Florida Association of Realtors show the median price of a single family home during the same time increasing 138% from $86,000 in 1995 to $205,000 in 2005

Homestead exemptions are only available on an individual's primary home. Therefore, this exemption does not apply to businesses, rental property, second homes, homeowners claiming permanent residency-based exemptions or tax credits in other states, or homes with owners that do not claim Florida as their primary residence. Because of the "portability" provision of the January 2008 constitutional amendment, a homesteaded owner may now move up to $500,000 of the "Save Our Homes" benefit from one Florida home to the next. However, acquiring a house that had a homestead exemption does not entitle the buyer to retain the low tax rate enjoyed by the previous homesteaded resident, as homestead exemptions cannot be inherited or purchased.

Supporters of the "Save Our Homes" Amendment contend that it allows long-term residents with a fixed income to be able to afford to stay in their homes without being driven out by tax increases as their property value increases. Detractors argue that it creates an unfair system of taxation in which first time home buyers, new residents, seasonal residents, and businesses are burdened with more than their share of taxes while homesteaders are trapped in their own homes, often unable to move without doubling their tax rate.

Under Florida law, the homestead exemption is only available to US citizens, permanent resident aliens, or others who are legally able to form the intent to remain permanently under immigration laws.

For the taxation homestead exemption, "Persons Residing Under Color of Law" (a term created by the courts which applies to persons in the US with asylum or parole status, or someone who has applied for and completed the I-485 application process for a green card but is still awaiting final approval/issuance of the card). A person in the US under an E, H, L or R-class visa is not eligible for homestead, pursuant to Rule 12D-7.007(3), Florida Administrative Code. A person under an H or L visa who has an already approved I-140, and is awaiting USCIS retrogressions in order to submit the I-485 application, is not benefited with the homestead exemption. There is a loophole in the system, however. J-4 visa holders, who are spouses of J-1 visa holders, are assigned an Alien Number. Some counties accept alien numbers as part of the requirements to obtain a homestead exemption, although J visa holders cannot file for adjustment of status.

Also, in general, a husband and wife in an intact marriage are treated as a single "family unit" under Florida law and are only entitled to a total of one homestead exemption no matter how many homes they own and occupy.

== Protection to surviving spouse or minor child ==
The provision also protects a spouse in several ways. First, it restrains the homeowner from conveying the property without the approval of their spouse, even if the property is entirely in the name of one spouse, or was purchased entirely from funds of one spouse. The provision also prohibits a spouse from devising the property by will, if the homeowner is survived by a spouse or a minor child. If such a devise is made, it is deemed invalid, and the surviving spouse will enjoy a life estate with the remainder to the decedent's children. The surviving spouse may elect to take a 50% interest in lieu of the life estate as long as the election is made within six months of when the homeowner died. The election, in the form of a prescribed form, is recorded in the official record book of the county where the property lies, not with the probate court. If this election is made, the remaining 50% is inherited by the decedent's children. A spouse may waive these rights in writing with respect to the will, but a minor child is not competent to do so. Finally, the homestead exemption for property taxes automatically attaches to the surviving spouse, so the property will never be exposed to the creditors of either spouse because of the death of the other.

== Obtaining a Homestead Exemption for Property Taxes ==
The elected Property Appraisers of Florida's 67 counties are the state constitutional officers responsible for maintaining the integrity of the homestead tax exemption program. No one in Florida "automatically" obtains a homestead exemption. Instead, a homeowner on title (or the beneficiary of a trust, a person legally or naturally dependent upon the owner or lessees having an original term of 98 years or more, all having to meet "equitable title to real estate" law) must file for a homestead exemption with the Property Appraiser in the county in which the property is located. While most counties still use paper applications, a few larger counties offer online homestead filing. While the applicable statutes are the same in all 67 counties, the standards applied vary greatly. Some Property Appraiser offices require significantly more documentation than others, as determining eligibility is a matter within the discretion of each appraiser. Once a homestead exemption has been filed and accepted it automatically rolls over every year and does not require annual re-filing. It then becomes the obligation of the homeowner to inform the property appraiser when they no longer use the homestead property as their primary residence.

== See also ==
- Law of Florida
