= Florida Department of State =

Department of the Florida state government

- The Great Seal of Florida

Agency overview
- Formed: 1969; 57 years ago
- Jurisdiction: Florida
- Headquarters: R. A. Gray Building, 500 South Bronough Street, Tallahassee
- Employees: 447 authorized positions (FY 2026-27)
- Annual budget: US$186.6 million (FY 2026-27) (Note: The FY 2026-27 operating budget by program: Arts and Culture, $64.7 million; Library, Archives and Information Services, $36.4 million; Elections, $25.9 million; Historical Resources Preservation and Exhibition, $22.2 million; Office of the Secretary and Administrative Services, $18.8 million; Corporations, $16.3 million; Office of Election Crimes and Security, $2.2 million.)
- Agency executive: Cord Byrd, Secretary of State
- Website: dos.fl.gov

The Florida Department of State (FDOS) is the department of the Florida state government responsible for elections, business filings, arts and culture, historic preservation, and the state library and archives. It is directed by the secretary of state, who is appointed by the governor then subject to confirmation by the Florida Senate. The department is organized into the Office of the Secretary, six divisions, and two further offices for international affairs and for election crimes and security.

== History ==
The office of secretary of state is predates the department. Its predecessor, the secretary of the territory, was created in 1821, when Florida became a United States territory, and its holders were appointed by the president with the confirmation of Congress. James T. Archer became the first secretary of state at statehood in 1845. The office's main early duties included keeping the state's records and its seal.

The modern Department of State was formed in 1969, by combining the secretary's office with several other state agencies. Its primary statute, section 20.10 of the Florida Statutes, dates from chapter 69-106 of the Laws of Florida. The position moved to appointed only in 2003; prior to this, the secretary was elected by Florida voters.

The secretary gained oversight of the Office of International Affairs in 2021 and of the Office of Election Crimes and Security in 2022. The elections office was created by Senate Bill 524, which Governor Ron DeSantis signed in April 2022, to investigate voting irregularities. In June 2024 DeSantis vetoed $32 million in arts and culture funding from the state budget. The Division of Arts and Culture had recommended $77 million to fund 630 qualifying nonprofit organizations before the legislature reduced the amount.

== Organization ==
The department's divisions are Administrative Services, Arts and Culture, Corporations, Elections, Historical Resources, and Library and Information Services. (Note: Section 20.10 of the Florida Statutes names the sixth division the "Division of Administration"; the department calls it the Division of Administrative Services.)

- The Division of Administrative Services runs the department's information technology office, finances, human resources, and general services.
- The Division of Arts and Culture is Florida's state arts agency and awards grants to cultural institutions. It houses the Office of International Affairs, which supports the secretary's role as the state's chief protocol officer and serves as the state's point of contact for foreign consulates.
- The Division of Corporations is the central filing office for business entities, which can file online through its Sunbiz.org website.
- The Division of Elections supports the secretary as the state's chief election officer and provides administrative support to the 67 county supervisors of elections. The Office of Election Crimes and Security can open preliminary investigations into reported violations of the state election code.
- The Division of Historical Resources is responsible for the state's historic and archaeological sites, and its director serves as the state's historic preservation officer. It has three bureaus:
  - The Bureau of Historic Preservation oversees the National Register of Historic Places program for Florida and maintains the Florida Master Site File, the state's inventory of historical resources.
  - The Bureau of Historical Museums operates the Museum of Florida History, The Grove Museum, Mission San Luis, and the Knott House Museum.
  - The Bureau of Archaeological Research.
- The Division of Library and Information Services manages the State Library of Florida, the State Archives of Florida, and the state records center, and distributes grants to more than 500 public libraries.
