= Surface Water Improvement and Management Program =

Surface Water Improvement and Management Program (S.W.I.M, sometimes written as SWIM) is a Florida state program to improve Florida's water quality.

== History ==
Swim was started in 1988 by the Department of Environmental Protection to address Florida's worsening water quality and protect drinking water quality.
