= Homestead exemption =

Legal regime to protect homes' value

The homestead exemption is a legal regime to protect the value of the homes of residents from property taxes, creditors, and circumstances that arise from the death of the homeowner's spouse, disability, or other situations.

Such laws are found in the statutes or the constitution of many of the states in the United States. The homestead exemption in some states of the South has its legal origins in the exemption laws of the Spanish Empire. In other states, they were enacted in response to the effects of 19th-century economy.

== Description ==
Homestead exemption laws typically have four primary features:

1. Preventing the forced sale of a home to meet the demands of creditors, usually except mortgages, mechanic's liens, or sales to pay property taxes
2. Providing the surviving spouse with shelter
3. Providing an exemption from property taxes on a home
4. Allowing a tax-exempt homeowner to vote on property tax increases to homeowners over the threshold, by bond or millage requests

For the purposes of statutes, a homestead is the one primary residence of a person, and no other exemption can be claimed on any other property anywhere, even outside the boundaries of the jurisdiction in which the exemption is claimed.

In some states, homestead protection is automatic. In many states, however, homeowners receive the protections of the law only if they file a claim for homestead exemption with the state. The protection is typically lost if the homeowner takes up primary residence elsewhere.

== Immunity from forced sale ==
Different jurisdictions provide different degrees of protection under homestead exemption laws. Some protect only property up to a certain value, and others have acreage limitations. If a homestead exceeds the limits, creditors may still force the sale, but the homesteader may keep a certain amount of the proceeds of the sale.

California provides a homestead exemption of between $300,000 and $600,000, no greater than the amount of the prior year countywide median sale price of a single-family home, both values adjusted annually for inflation, as a result of legislation enacted in 2023.

Texas, Florida, Iowa, South Dakota, Kansas, and Oklahoma have some of the broadest homestead protections in the United States in terms of the value of property that can be protected.

Texas's homestead exemption has no dollar value limit and has a 10 acres (4.0 hectares) exemption limit for homesteads inside of a municipality (urban homestead) and 100 acres (40 hectares) for those outside of a municipality (rural homestead). The rural acre allotment is doubled for a family: 200 acres (81 hectares) can be shielded from creditors in Texas for a rural homestead.

In Kansas and Oklahoma, exemptions protect 160 acres (65 hectares) of land of any value outside of a municipality's corporate limits and 1 acre (0.40 hectares) of land of any value within a municipality's corporate limits. Most homestead exemptions cover the land including fixtures and improvements to it, such as buildings, timber, and landscaping.

Nevada exempts $605,000 in equity from sale on execution, but for homesteads for which allodial title has been established and not relinquished, the exemption extends to all equity in the homestead.

New Mexico has a $150,000 exemption. Alaska has a $54,000 exemption.

Colorado has a $250,000 exemption, or $350,000 for people who are over 60 or disabled.

In most states, the real dollar value of "protection" provided by the laws has diminished, as exemption dollar amounts are not always adjusted for inflation. The protective intent of such laws, with some notable exceptions like those stated above, has been eroded in most states.

== Property tax exemption ==
A homestead exemption is most often on only a fixed monetary amount, such as the first $50,000 of the assessed value. The remainder is taxed at the normal rate. A home valued at $150,000 would then be taxed on only $100,000 and a home valued at $75,000 would then be taxed on only $25,000. In some places, the exemption is paid for with a local or state (or equivalent unit) sales tax.

=== Examples ===
- Arkansas provides a $500 annual homestead property credit toward the amount of property taxes due. Seniors can have their homestead assessed value "frozen" at the next assessment date after reaching age 65.
- California exempts the first $7,000 of residential homestead from property taxes.
- Colorado allows a 50% deduction for up to the first $200,000 (equivalent to a $100,000 exemption if the property is valued at $200,000 or above) for seniors (over age 65) who have lived in their property for ten consecutive years.
- Georgia allows a 1% HEST only in a few counties.
- In Hawaii, Honolulu takes $120,000 off of the assessment value for residents.
- Florida's homestead exemption allows an exemption of 160 acres outside of a municipality and one-half an acre inside a municipality. Florida's exemption is for the first $50,000 of the value of a property.
- Idaho exempts 50% of property tax for primary residences up to $125,000.
- Kentucky, for 2019 and 2020, the exemption has been set at $39,300. Once it is approved, homeowners who are 65 or older do not need to reapply for the homestead exemption each year.
- Louisiana exempts the first $7,500 of residential homestead from local property taxes.
- Maine exempts the first $25,000 of a primary residential homestead from property taxes. This is paid to the municipality and refunded when state taxes are filed.
- Michigan exempts the homeowner from paying the operating millage of local school districts.
- Mississippi exemption from all ad valorem taxes assessed to property; this is limited to the first $7,500 of the assessed value or $300 of the actual exempted tax dollars.
- New York's School Tax Relief (STAR) program exempts the first $30,000 of a primary home's assessed value from school district taxes; the exemption is limited to owners with incomes under $500,000. Additional exemptions are available for people over 65 with a limited income. The STAR program applies only to school taxes; no homestead exemption exists for taxes levied by other municipal entities. New York prevents a New York resident claiming this exemption if the New York resident owns property in another state and claims a similar exemption in that other state.
- Oklahoma allows a $1000 deduction of the assessed valuation, about $75 to $125 of savings per year, if owners file for homestead exemption with the local county clerk.
- Rhode Island allows exemptions that vary by town or city among those towns that offer exemptions.
- Texas allows a deduction, with additional exemptions available for county taxes, people over 65 and people who are disabled. It also requires school districts to offer a $140,000 exemption (but not other taxing districts, such as cities and counties).
- Utah exempts 45% of a property's taxable value, applicable only to residential properties “used as a primary residence for 183 or more consecutive calendar days during the calendar year.”

== See also ==
- Pied-à-terre
- Vacancy tax
