= Florida property law =

Florida is one of several states where the courts are required to be involved in every step of the foreclosure process. By 2012, it took three years to complete the process. In nonjudicial states, it takes an average of 100 days. As a result of the United States housing bubble, there is a large backlog of housing that is in the foreclosure process but unavailable to the market. This overhang has had a detrimental effect on the housing market.

Chapter 197.4 (of Title XIV) of the Florida Statutes applies to tax lien sales which provide liquidity to counties in lieu of actual taxes (investors are allowed to bid on and purchase tax lien certificates, which upon payment of the tax are repaid with interest to the investor). Chapter 197.5 of that same Title applies to tax deed sales which provides the holder of a tax lien certificate with the opportunity to foreclose on a delinquent taxpayer after a specified period of time.

== See also ==
- Homestead exemption in Florida
