= New York State School Tax Relief Program =

The New York State School Tax Relief Program (more commonly known as the STAR Program), or New York State Real Property Tax Law §425, is a school tax rebate program offered in New York State aimed at reducing school district property taxes on the primary residences of New York residents. In New York City, the STAR Program is a tax exemption for those who applied before Fiscal Year 2015-2016 and a tax credit there after for new applicants. The program, which acts similarly to (but is much less extensive than) homestead exemptions in other states, was enacted on August 7, 1997, a product of the annual budget of then-Governor George Pataki.

The STAR Program takes two forms: the Basic STAR and the Enhanced STAR. The Basic STAR is open to the primary residence of any New York State resident and exempts $30,000 from the true value of a home or property. The Enhanced STAR, for eligible senior citizens at or above age 65, exempts an annually variable amount ($65,300 for the 2015-2016 school year) from the true value of their primary residence. Essentially, the program is aimed to lower the tax burden on school district residents. This does not affect the overall revenue of a given school district; the difference is made up by the state, essentially making the program another source of state aid.

The STAR rebate is subtracted from the "true value" of the home in question. The true value of a home is the value determined at the time of the last property assessment (typically done by a town or county assessor), divided by an equalization rate, which is the ratio of assessed value to market value for each taxing jurisdiction, as calculated by the State of New York. Equalization rates are used because assessments are not done each year by town or county officials. In addition, school districts typically do not have the same boundaries as other taxing jurisdictions (cities and towns), so equalization calculations are needed to bring property values to the same levels within all neighboring municipalities, included in a given district.

To be eligible for the Enhanced STAR, a primary resident age 65 or older must have an adjusted gross income that does not exceed $86,300. Proof of age is required upon initial application.
