= Florida Geological Survey =

Geological survey of the state of Florida

- The logo of the Florida Geological Survey

Agency overview
- Formed: 1907
- Jurisdiction: Florida
- Headquarters: 3000 Commonwealth Boulevard, Tallahassee, Florida
- Agency executive: Guy H. "Harley" Means, Director and State Geologist
- Parent department: Florida Department of Environmental Protection
- Website: floridadep.gov/fgs

The Florida Geological Survey (FGS) is the geological survey of the U.S. state of Florida, part of the Florida Department of Environmental Protection (DEP). Created by the Florida Legislature in 1907, it collects, interprets, archives and distributes information on Florida's geology, including its water, mineral resources, and hazards such as sinkholes. It is headed by the State Geologist, who by law must be a registered professional geologist. The survey maintains the state's central repository of well cuttings and rock cores and a public research library which publishes reports on the state's geology, and designates State Geological Sites, seven of which are state parks.

== History ==
=== Founding ===
Before 1907, Florida had state geologists only in name. Francis L. Dancy held the title of "State Engineer and Geologist" from 1852 to 1855 but had no staff. The physician John Kost wrote geologic reports for the state in 1883 and 1886, but was never designated state geologist. In June 1907 the legislature funded a permanent state geological survey. Governor Napoleon B. Broward appointed Elias H. Sellards, a professor of geology and zoology at the University of Florida, as the first State Geologist.

Sellards began the agency in an unused committee room in the state capitol, and later moved it to a two-room office shared with the state chemist. By 1908 he had hired Herman Gunter as his assistant, started the survey's library and museum collections, and attended the first meeting of the Association of American State Geologists. The botanist Roland McMillan Harper worked for the survey from 1908 to 1931. During his tenure, Sellards published 12 annual reports, two bulletins, a geologic map and many articles, mostly on the basic geology and mineral resources of Florida. He also took a strong interest in fossil vertebrates and early humans. Human remains found alongside extinct Pleistocene animals at Vero, now Vero Beach, led to a 1916 conference of scientists at the site and a long-running controversy over the age of "Vero Man". Sellards left Florida to join the Texas Bureau of Economic Geology. (Note: The Association of American State Geologists' centennial history gives Sellards's departure as April 1919. A biography published by the University of Texas's Jackson School of Geosciences gives 1918.)

== Responsibilities ==
Florida law directs DEP to maintain the geological survey under a State Geologist, who must be a full-time professional geologist registered in the state. The survey is required to study the state's rocks, minerals, landforms and groundwater, with special attention to their practical value to Floridians, and to give technical help to the public, government agencies and industry. Its other duties are:

- publishing reports and maps on the state's geology and earth resources;
- keeping a comprehensive research library open to the public;
- acting as a clearinghouse for the naming of the state's geologic units;
- collecting data on the state's mineral industry, and mapping oil, gas and test wells;
- running a central statewide repository for geologic specimens, well cuttings and rock cores.

== State geological sites ==
State law authorizes the State Geologist to designate "state geological sites" and "state invertebrate paleontological sites." These designations are defined as places of great and continuing significance to the scientific study and public understanding of Florida's geologic history. A privately owned site can be designated only with its owners' written consent. Once a site is designated, no one may carry out geological or paleontological fieldwork there without the survey's permission. As of 2026, nine State Geological Sites have been designated:

- Windley Key Fossil Reef Geological State Park (1998)
- Devil's Millhopper Geological State Park (1998)
- Florida Caverns State Park (2000)
- Edward Ball Wakulla Springs State Park (2018)
- Falling Waters State Park (2019)
- Torreya State Park (2022)
- Jennings Bluff Tract (2023)
- Paynes Prairie Preserve State Park (2024)
- Alum Bluff (2025)
