= Florida Administrative Register =

Government gazette of Florida

- Type: Daily government gazette
- Editor: Florida Department of State
- Website: www.flrules.org

The Florida Administrative Register (FAR) is the daily publication containing proposed rules and notices of state agencies of Florida.

The FAR publishes information on final rules as well as the status of proposed rules, emergency rules, and any changes or withdrawals related to existing or proposed rules.

The FAR is specifically required to publish the following list of notices:

- Notices of Rule Development
- Notices of Proposed Rules
- Notices of Change, Correction and Withdrawal
- Emergency Rules
- Petitions and Dispositions Regarding Rule Variance and Waiver
- Notices of Meetings, Workshops and Public Hearings
- Notices of Petitions and Dispositions Regarding Declaratory Statements
- Notices of Petitions and Dispositions Regarding Non-rule Policy Changes
- Announcements and Objection Reports of the Joint Administrative Procedures Committee
- Notices Regarding Bids, Proposals and Purchasing
- Notices of Intent to Adopt rules pursuant to Sections 120.54(6), 120.54(1)(i)2., and 403.8055, Florida Statute
- Notices of Invalidation of a Proposed or Effective Rule

== See also ==
- Florida Administrative Code
- Law of Florida
- Federal Register
