= Florida Administrative Code =

Florida agencies' rules and regulations

The Florida Administrative Code (FAC) is the official compilation of the rules and regulations of Florida regulatory agencies. The Florida Department of State oversees the publication of the FAC and, according to its website, updates it online weekly.

== See also ==
- Florida Administrative Register
- Law of Florida
