= Florida Rules of Civil Procedure =

The Florida Constitution, in Article V, Section 2(a), vests the power to adopt rules for the "practice and procedure in all courts" in the Florida Supreme Court. The Florida Supreme Court adopted the Florida Rules of Civil Procedure in March 1954. The proper abbreviation for the rules is Fla.R.Civ.P. The rules may be amended, or new rules added, from time to time and upon the approval of the Florida Supreme Court.

== Scope ==
The rules apply to all civil actions and special statutory proceedings in circuit and county courts, except probate court, family court, and small claims court.

== Personal jurisdiction in Florida ==
For a court in Florida to have personal jurisdiction over a defendant, Florida statutory requirements must be met and federal Constitutional limits must be complied with.

=== Florida statutory requirements for personal jurisdiction ===
Florida statutes allow for personal jurisdiction over defendants who:

1. Reside in Florida (and are natural persons),
2. Are served with process in Florida,
3. Consent to jurisdiction,
4. Make a general appearance without timely objection,
5. Are a corporation incorporated in Florida,
6. Are a corporation with their principal place of business in Florida, or
7. Whose acts trigger Florida's long-arm statute.

=== In rem and quasi in rem jurisdiction ===
In rem jurisdiction affects the interests of all persons in a thing. In rem jurisdiction may be exercised in a limited class of cases, when the court has control over the thing itself, like with a suit to quiet title to land in Florida.

Quasi in rem jurisdiction affects the interest of specified persons in a thing. The court must have physical power over the property itself, like by attachment, and the constitutional minimum contacts standard must be met.

== Subject matter jurisdiction in Florida ==
For a court in Florida to have subject matter jurisdiction, Florida statutory requirements must be met and federal Constitutional limits must be complied with. The Florida Constitution vested the judicial power in four types of courts:

=== County courts ===
- Has jurisdiction over all law matters less than $30,000 (except ones within the exclusive jurisdiction of circuit court), cases in equity less than $30,000, landlord-tenant eviction actions, real property possession actions, uncontested or simplified divorce proceedings, and homeowners' associations disputes.

=== Circuit courts ===
- (Usually) has appellate review of county court decisions. Is the trial court of general jurisdiction, so it hears cases at law and equity, ejectment actions, real property title or boundary actions, etc.

=== District courts of appeal (DCA) ===
- Once a circuit court decision is final, it can be heard as a matter of right by the DCA unless the matter is exclusively in the supreme court's jurisdiction.

=== Supreme Court of Florida ===
- Appellate court with limited jurisdiction. Appeal may be discretionary or may be a matter of right.

== Venue in Florida ==
Typically, venue is proper only in the county where the defendant resides when the action begins, where the cause of action arose, or where property in litigation is located. If multiple defendants reside in different counties, venue can be in any one of their counties of residence.

=== Change of venue ===
See change of venue and Fla.R.Civ.P. 1.060. Transfers of Actions.

=== Choice of forum ===
Fla.R.Civ.P. 1.061 prescribes choice of forum rules. A defendant can file a forum non conveniens motion to dismiss a cause of action within 60 days of service of process. Under Rule 1.061(a), a trial court, in its discretion, can dismiss an action "on the ground that a satisfactory remedy may be more conveniently sought in a jurisdiction other than Florida" when it finds there is an adequate alternative forum which private interest factors favor. If the competing private factors are balanced, public interest factors can tip the scales in favor of the alternative forum.

== Process ==
Fla.R.Civ.P. 1.070 - Process, explains Service of Process including Personal Service and Service by Publication. When a complaint is filed at the clerk of court (commencing the action), the clerk or judge will automatically issue a summons letting the defendant know about the claim and that if defendant does not respond, defendant will lose by default. Service of process may be made by an officer or an appointed, competent, uninterested person. The process server should make proof of service through affidavit.

== Pleadings and motions ==
Florida recognizes just seven different pleadings in Fla.R.Civ.P. 1.100:

1. Complaint (or if designated by statute/rule, "Petition")
2. Answer
3. Reply (if the answer contains a defense, the opposing party must file a reply to avoid it)
4. Answer to a counterclaim
5. Answer to a crossclaim (if the answer contains a crossclaim)
6. Third-party complaint (if someone who was not an original party is summoned as a third-party defendant)
7. Third-party answer

Motions are not pleadings. Motions are applications to the court for an order. They must be in writing unless during a hearing or trial. A motion has to state with particularity the grounds for it, and must explain the relief or order it seeks.

== Parties ==
=== Interpleader ===
See Fla.R.Civ.P. 1.240. Interpleader.

=== Joinder of parties ===
For joinder, misjoinder and nonjoinder of parties, see Fla.R.Civ.P. 1.250.

=== Class actions ===
Fla.R.Civ.P. 1.220 deals with class actions. Florida's approach to class actions is similar to the Federal Rules of Civil Procedure, Rule 23. Two differences are that Florida requires that the pleading alleges that the class action prerequisites are met in a specific formulaic way, and Florida usually requires class members to be notified in all class actions.

== Discovery ==
Methods of Discovery in Florida:

1. Oral Depositions
2. Written depositions
3. Written interrogatories
4. Production of documents or things or permission to enter upon land or other property for inspection and other purposes
5. Physical and mental examinations
6. Requests for admission

According to Fla.R.Civ.P. 1.280(b)(1), all nonprivileged information that is relevant to the subject of the pending action may be discovered. Inadmissible material that may lead to admissible material is discoverable. The frequency of use of these discovery methods is not limited, except in a few circumstances. Each party bears the cost of his or her own discovery.

== Pretrial procedures ==
See Fla.R.Civ.P. 1.200 - Pretrial Procedure.

== Trial procedures ==
=== Continuances ===
Under Fla.R.Civ.P. 1.460, a motion for a continuance should generally be written and signed by the party requesting the continuance, stating the facts entitling the moving party to a continuance.

=== Jury trials ===
Under the Florida Constitution, Article I, Section 22, there is a right to a trial by jury for all cases at law, but not in cases only involving equitable remedies. The Florida Constitution sets the minimum number of jurors at six.

== Remedies ==
Fla.R.Civ.P. 1.630- Extraordinary Remedies- applies to actions for the issuance of writs of mandamus, prohibition, quo warranto, and habeas corpus. Other remedies include: Injunction, Declaratory Judgment, Attachment, and Garnishment.

== See also ==
- Law of Florida
- Florida Legislature
