= Law of Florida =

The law of Florida consists of several levels, including constitutional, statutory, and regulatory law, as well as case law and local law. The Florida Statutes form the general statutory law of Florida.

== Sources ==
The Constitution of Florida is the foremost source of state law. Legislation is enacted by the Florida Legislature, published in the Laws of Florida, and codified in the Florida Statutes. State agencies publish regulations (sometimes called administrative law) in the Florida Administrative Register (FAR), which are in turn codified in the Florida Administrative Code (FAC). Florida's legal system is based on common law, which is interpreted by case law through the decisions of the Supreme Court, District Courts of Appeal, and Circuit Courts, which are published in the Florida Cases, Southern Reporter, Florida Law Weekly, and Florida Law Weekly Supplement. Counties and municipalities may also promulgate local ordinances. There are also several sources of persuasive authority, which are not binding authority but are useful to lawyers and judges insofar as they help to clarify the current state of the law.

=== Constitution ===
The Florida Constitution (the state constitution) defines how the statutes must be passed into law, and defines the limits of authority and basic law that acts of the legislature must comply with.

=== Legislation ===
Pursuant to the state constitution, the Florida Legislature has enacted legislation, called "chapter laws" or generically as "slip laws" when printed separately. These are in turn compiled into the Laws of Florida and are called "session laws". The Florida Statutes are the codified statutory laws of the state.

The Florida Constitution defines how the statutes must be passed into law, and defines the limits of authority and basic law that the Florida Statutes must be complied with. Laws are approved by the Florida Legislature and signed into law by the Governor of Florida. Certain types of laws are prohibited by the state constitution.

=== Regulations ===
Pursuant to certain statutes, state agencies have promulgated bodies of regulations (sometimes called administrative law). The regulations are codified in the Florida Administrative Code (FAC). The Florida Administrative Register (FAR) is the daily publication containing proposed rules and notices of state agencies. There are also numerous decisions, opinions and rulings of state agencies.

=== Common law and case law ===
Florida's legal system is based on common law, which is interpreted by case law through the decisions of the Supreme Court of Florida, Florida District Courts of Appeal, and Florida circuit courts. There is no official reporter. Opinions of the Supreme Court and District Courts of Appeal are published in the Florida Cases (a Florida-specific version of the Southern Reporter) and Florida Law Weekly. Appellate and trial court opinions of the Florida circuit courts and County Courts are published in the Florida Law Weekly Supplement. The Florida Reports published opinions of the court from 1846 to 1948.

Florida courts practice judicial review, which means certain laws and regulations can be struck down (ruled unconstitutional) by the Florida state courts. The Florida Constitution, in Article V, Section 2(a), vests the power to adopt rules for the "practice and procedure in all courts" in the Florida Supreme Court, which has adopted the Florida Rules of Civil Procedure. Although Title VI of the Florida Statutes is labeled "Civil Practice and Procedure", the statutes it contains are limited to only issues of substantive law.

=== Local ordinances ===
Florida's counties and municipalities may also promulgate local ordinances. Municipal ordinances take precedence over conflicting non-charter county ordinances, whereas ordinances of charter counties may prevail in specific circumstances defined in the charters.

=== Other ===
There are also several sources of persuasive authority, which are not binding authority but are useful to lawyers and judges insofar as they help to clarify the current state of the law. Florida Jurisprudence is a major legal encyclopedia.

== Unique features ==
Sovereign immunity laws ensure that action cannot be brought against the Florida government for more than $200,000, with an exception for breach of contract cases. Specifically, section 768.28, Florida Statutes, is a limited waiver of the state's sovereign immunity. It provides that neither the state nor its agencies or subdivisions is liable to pay a tort claim or a judgment by any one person over $100,000 or any claim or judgment over $200,000, when totaled with all other claims paid by the state or its agencies or subdivisions arising out of the same incident. The Supreme Court recognized the exception for breach of contract cases. The Court noted that the statutory waiver of sovereign immunity is related to torts and there is no analogous waiver in contract, but that the Legislature, by law, had authorized state entities to enter into contracts, so "the legislature has clearly intended that such contracts be valid and binding on both parties".

== See also ==
=== Topics ===
- Capital punishment in Florida
- Felony murder rule (Florida)
- Gun laws in Florida
- Cannabis in Florida
- LGBT rights in Florida
- Florida property law

=== Other ===
- Politics of Florida
- List of law enforcement agencies in Florida
- Crime in Florida
- List of Florida state prisons
- Incarceration in Florida
- Law of the United States
