= Florida Department of Air and Water Pollution Control =

Former governmental department in Florida, USA

The Florida Department of Air and Water Pollution Control was the state of Florida's first agency devoted strictly to environmental quality. It was created under the authority of Florida Statute 69-109 during the administration of Governor Claude Kirk, in 1969. The agency's name was changed to the Florida Department of Pollution Control in 1971. This agency was merged with part of the Florida Department of Health several years later, to form the Florida Department of Environmental Regulation.
