= Florida Department of Environmental Regulation =

Government agency

The Florida Department of Environmental Regulation (DER) was the agency which, from the mid-1970s to the mid-1990s, handled regulation, management, conservation, compliance and enforcement of a wide range of environmental and natural resource activities in the state of Florida, United States. Prior to that time, these activities were functions of the Florida Department of Health and of the Florida Department of Pollution Control. DER has now been merged with the Florida Department of Natural Resources to form the Florida Department of Environmental Protection.

It performed a regulatory role, relying on air and water quality standards and waste management regulations. It was specifically tasked with the goals of:

- keeping Florida's waters clean
- keeping Florida's air clear of pollutants
- keeping Florida's land free from contamination

== Environmental Regulation Commission ==
The Florida Environmental Regulation Commission (ERC) is an unpaid citizenry board created under Section 20.255(6), Florida Statutes (F.S.). The commission is tasked with weighing/balancing all factors that go into setting standards. Membership consists of "seven residents of this state appointed by the Governor, subject to confirmation by the Senate."

The duties and powers of the commission are set in Section 403 of the Florida Statutes. The ERC was defined as the standard-setting authority for the DER. The role of the ERC was to approve for adoption most standards relating to air pollution, water quality, and waste management.

== Sources ==
- Florida Statutes. Section 403.804.
