= Laws of Florida =

The Laws of Florida are the session laws of the Florida Legislature, a verbatim publication of the general and special laws enacted by the Florida Legislature in a given year and published each year following the regular session of the legislature. It presents the laws in the order in which they are numbered by the Secretary of State, as well as resolutions and memorials passed by the Legislature.

== See also ==
- Florida Statutes
- Law of Florida
- United States Statutes at Large
