= Florida Statutes =

- Editor: Division of Statutory Revision; Florida Office of Legislative Services
- OCLC: 3454372

The Florida Statutes are the codified, statutory laws of Florida; it currently has 49 titles. A chapter in the Florida Statutes represents all relevant statutory laws on a particular subject. The statutes are the selected reproduction of the portions of each session law, which are published in the Laws of Florida, that have general applicability.

While the legislature may create specific chapters, the Florida Office of Legislative Services' Division of Statutory Revision has the final authority to determine where the legislation will be codified and the location of the sections within the chapters. Some laws do not appear in the statutes where the bill identifies their placement.

Since 1999, the Florida Statutes have been published annually. Before then, they were published biannually following each odd-year regular session, and a supplement was published following each even-year regular session. The practice of publishing the Florida Statutes every other year was a relic of when the Florida Legislature, prior to 1969, met only in odd-numbered years.

== Titles of the Florida Statutes ==
- Title I: Construction of Statutes (Chapters 1–2)
- Title II: State Organization (Chapters 6–8)
- Title III: Legislative Branch; Commissions (Chapters 10–13)
- Title IV: Executive Branch (Chapters 14–24)
- Title V: Judicial Branch (Chapters 25–44)
- Title VI: Civil Practice and Procedure (Chapters 45–88)
- Title VII: Evidence (Chapters 90–92)
- Title VIII: Limitations (Chapters 95)
- Title IX: Electors and Elections (Chapters 97–107)
- Title X: Public Officers, Employees, and Records (Chapters 110–122)
- Title XI: County Organization and Intergovernmental Relations (Chapters 124–164)
- Title XII: Municipalities (Chapters 165–185)
- Title XIII: Planning and Development (Chapters 186–191)
- Title XIV: Taxation and Finance (Chapters 192–221)
- Title XV: Homestead and Exemptions (Chapter 222)
- Title XVI: Teachers' Retirement System; Higher Educational Facilities Bonds (Chapters 238–243)
- Title XVII: Military Affairs and Related Matters (Chapters 250–252)
- Title XVIII: Public Lands and Property (Chapters 253–274)
- Title XIX: Public Business (Chapters 279–290)
- Title XX: Veterans (Chapters 292–296)
- Title XXI: Drainage (Chapter 298)
- Title XXII: Ports and Harbors (Chapters 308–315)
- Title XXIII: Motor Vehicles (Chapters 316–325)
- Title XXIV: Vessels (Chapters 326–328)
- Title XXV: Aviation (Chapters 329–333)
- Title XXVI: Public Transportation (Chapters 334–349)
- Title XXVII: Railroads And Other Regulated Utilities (Chapters 350–368)
- Title XXVIII: Natural Resources; Conservation, Reclamation, and Use (Chapters 369–380)
- Title XXIX: Public health (Chapters 381–408)
  - Includes 394.451-394.47891, Baker Act
- Title XXX: Social Welfare (Chapters 409–430)
- Title XXXI: Labor (Chapters 435–452)
- Title XXXII: Regulation of Professions and Occupations (Chapters 454–493)
- Title XXXIII: Regulation of Trade, Commerce, Investments, and Solicitations (Chapters 494–560)
- Title XXXIV: Alcoholic Beverages and Tobacco (Chapters 561–569)
- Title XXXV: Agriculture, Horticulture, and Animal Industry (Chapters 570–604)
- Title XXXVI: Business Organizations (Chapters 606–623)
- Title XXXVII: Insurance (Chapters 624–651)
- Title XXXVIII: Banks and Banking (Chapters 655–667)
- Title XXXIX: Commercial Relations (Chapters 668–688)
- Title XL: Real and Personal Property (Chapters 689–723)
- Title XLI: Statute of Frauds, Fraudulent Transfers, and General Assignments (Chapters 725–727)
- Title XLII: Estates and Trusts (Chapters 731–739)
- Title XLIII: Domestic Relations (Chapters 741–753)
- Title XLIV: Civil Rights (Chapters 760–765)
- Title XLV: Torts (Chapters 766–774)
- Title XLVI: Crimes (Chapters 775–896)
- Title XLVII: Criminal Procedure and Corrections (Chapters 900–985)
- Title XLVIII: K-20 Education Code (Chapters 1000–1013)
- Title XLIX: Parental Rights (Chapter 1014)

== See also ==
- Laws of Florida
- Law of Florida
- United States Code

=== Topics ===
- Capital punishment in Florida
- Felony murder rule (Florida)
- Gun laws in Florida
- LGBT rights in Florida
- Florida property law
