= List of law enforcement agencies in Florida =

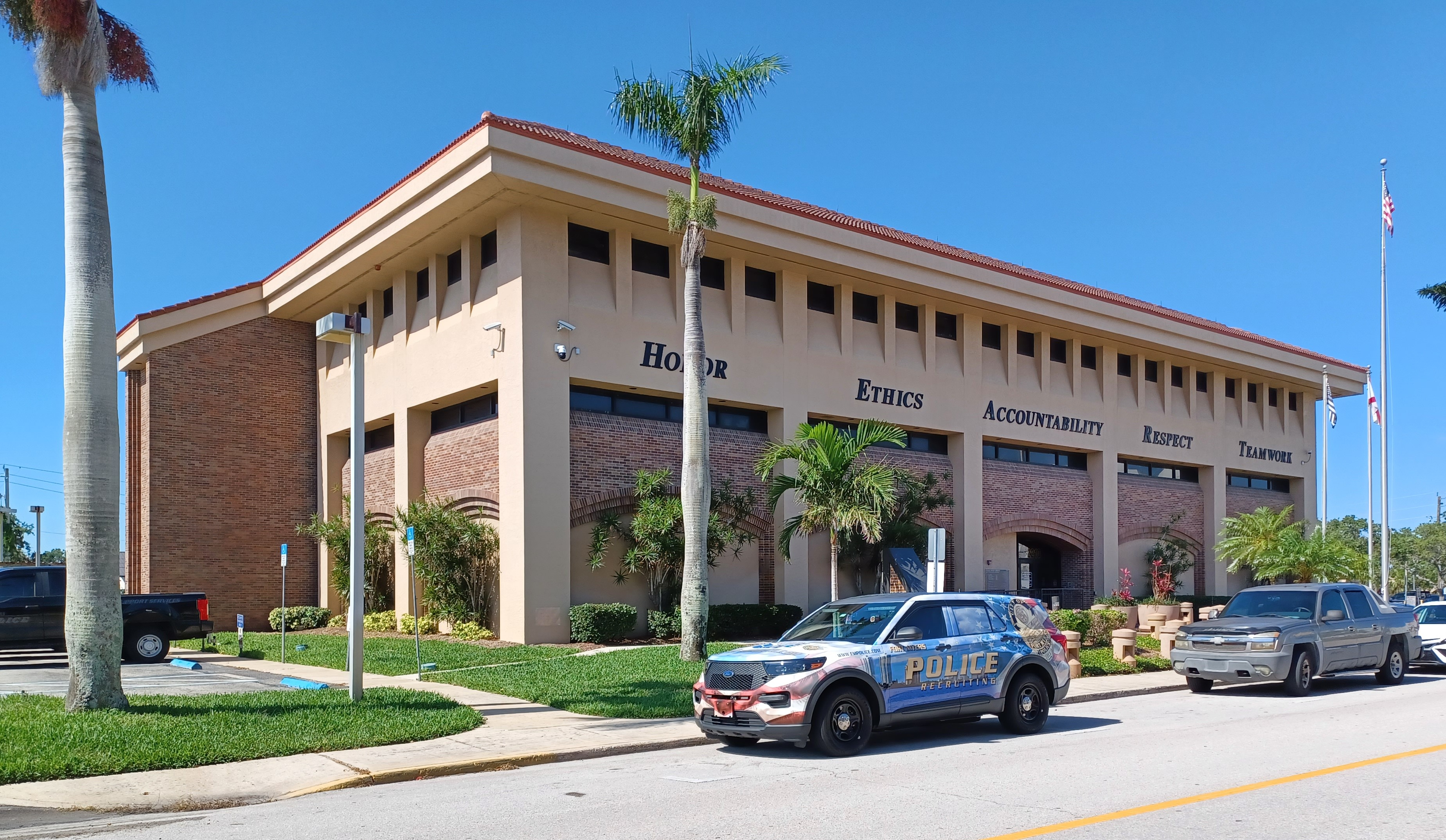
Fort Myers Police Department in Fort Myers, Florida

This is a list of Law Enforcement Agencies in the state of Florida.

According to the US Bureau of Justice Statistics' 2018 Census of State and Local Law Enforcement Agencies, the state had 373 law enforcement agencies employing 47,177 sworn police officers, about 222 for each 100,000 residents.

== State Agencies ==
- Florida Department of Agriculture and Consumer Services
  - Office of Agricultural Law Enforcement
- Florida Department of Business and Professional Regulation
  - Division of Alcoholic Beverages and Tobacco
    - Bureau of Law Enforcement
- Florida Department of Corrections
  - Office of Inspector General
    - Bureau of State Investigations/Law Enforcement
  - Office of the Secretary
  - Bureau of Probation and Parole
- Florida Department of Environmental Protection
  - Division of Law Enforcement
    - Environmental Crimes Unit
- Florida Department of Financial Services
  - Division of Investigative and Forensic Services
- Florida Department of Highway Safety and Motor Vehicles
  - Division of Florida Highway Patrol
- Florida Department of Law Enforcement
  - Division of Investigations and Forensic Science
  - Division of Florida Capitol Police
- Florida Fish and Wildlife Conservation Commission
  - Division of Law Enforcement
- Florida Gaming Control Commission
  - Division of Gaming Enforcement
- Florida Lottery
  - Division of Security
- Florida Office of the Attorney General
  - Medicaid Fraud Control Unit
- Florida Supreme Court
  - Office of the Marshal
- Florida First District Court of Appeal
  - Office of the Marshal
- Florida Second District Court of Appeal
  - Office of the Marshal
- Florida Third District Court of Appeal
  - Office of the Marshal
- Florida Fourth District Court of Appeal
  - Office of the Marshal
- Florida Fifth District Court of Appeal
  - Office of the Marshal
- Florida Sixth District Court of Appeal
  - Office of the Marshal
- Offices of State Attorney
  - 1st Judicial Circuit of Florida - Pensacola
  - 2nd Judicial Circuit of Florida - Tallahassee
  - 3rd Judicial Circuit of Florida - Live Oak
  - 4th Judicial Circuit of Florida - Jacksonville
  - 5th Judicial Circuit of Florida - Ocala
  - 6th Judicial Circuit of Florida - Clearwater
  - 7th Judicial Circuit of Florida - Daytona Beach
  - 8th Judicial Circuit of Florida - Gainesville
  - 9th Judicial Circuit of Florida - Orlando
  - 10th Judicial Circuit of Florida - Bartow
  - 11th Judicial Circuit of Florida - Miami
  - 12th Judicial Circuit of Florida - Sarasota
  - 13th Judicial Circuit of Florida - Tampa
  - 14th Judicial Circuit of Florida - Panama City
  - 15th Judicial Circuit of Florida - West Palm Beach
  - 16th Judicial Circuit of Florida - Key West
  - 17th Judicial Circuit of Florida - Fort Lauderdale
  - 18th Judicial Circuit of Florida - Viera
  - 19th Judicial Circuit of Florida - Fort Pierce
  - 20th Judicial Circuit of Florida - Fort Myers

== County Agencies ==
- Alachua County Sheriff's Office
- Baker County Sheriff's Office
- Bay County Sheriff's Office
- Bradford County Sheriff's Office
- Brevard County Sheriff's Office
- Broward County Sheriff's Office
- Calhoun County Sheriff's Office
- Charlotte County Sheriff's Office
- Citrus County Sheriff's Office
- Clay County Sheriff's Office
- Collier County Sheriff's Office
- Columbia County Sheriff's Office
- DeSoto County Sheriff's Office
- Dixie County Sheriff's Office
- Escambia County Sheriff's Office
- Flagler County Sheriff's Office
- Franklin County Sheriff's Office
- Gadsden County Sheriff's Office
- Gilchrist County Sheriff's Office
- Glades County Sheriff's Office
- Gulf County Sheriff's Office
- Hamilton County Sheriff's Office
- Hardee County Sheriff's Office
- Hendry County Sheriff's Office
- Hernando County Sheriff's Office
- Highlands County Sheriff's Office
- Hillsborough County Sheriff's Office
- Holmes County Sheriff's Office
- Indian River County Sheriff's Office
- Jackson County Sheriff's Office
- Jefferson County Sheriff's Office
- Lafayette County Sheriff's Office
- Lake County Sheriff's Office
- Lee County Sheriff's Office
- Leon County Sheriff's Office
- Levy County Sheriff's Office
- Liberty County Sheriff's Office
- Madison County Sheriff's Office
- Manatee County Sheriff's Office
- Marion County Sheriff's Office
- Martin County Sheriff's Office
- Miami-Dade Sheriff's Office
- Monroe County Sheriff's Office
- Nassau County Sheriff's Office
- Okaloosa County Sheriff's Office
- Okeechobee County Sheriff's Office
- Orange County Sheriff's Office
- Osceola County Sheriff's Office
- Palm Beach County Sheriff's Office
- Pasco County Sheriff's Office
- Pinellas County Sheriff's Office
- Polk County Sheriff's Office
- Putnam County Sheriff's Office
- Santa Rosa County Sheriff's Office
- Sarasota County Sheriff's Office
- Seminole County Sheriff's Office
- St. Johns County Sheriff's Office
- St. Lucie County Sheriff's Office
- Sumter County Sheriff's Office
- Suwannee County Sheriff's Office
- Taylor County Sheriff's Office
- Union County Sheriff's Office
- Volusia County Sheriff's Office
- Wakulla County Sheriff's Office
- Walton County Sheriff's Office
- Washington County Sheriff's Office

== City Agencies ==
- Alachua Police Department
- Altamonte Springs Police Department
- Altha Police Department
- Apalachicola Police Department
- Apopka Police Department
- Arcadia Police Department
- Astatula Police Department
- Atlantic Beach Police Department
- Atlantis Police Department
- Auburndale Police Department
- Aventura Police Department
- Bal Harbour Police Department
- Bartow Police Department
- Bay Harbor Islands Police Department
- Belleair Police Department
- Belleview Police Department
- Belle Isle Police Department
- Biscayne Park Police Department
- Blountstown Police Department
- Boca Raton Police Department
- Bonifay Police Department
- Bowling Green Police Department
- Boynton Beach Police Department
- Bradenton Beach Police Department
- Bradenton Police Department
- Bunnell Police Department
- Cape Coral Police Department
- Carabelle Police Department
- Casselberry Police Department
- Cedar Key Police Department
- Chattahoochee Police Department
- Chiefland Police Department
- Chipley Police Department
- Clearwater Police Department
- Clermont Police Department
- Clewiston Police Department
- Cocoa Beach Police Department
- Cocoa Police Department
- Coconut Creek Police Department
- Coral Gables Police Department
- Coral Springs Police Department
- Cottondale Police Department
- Crestview Police Department
- Cross City Police Department
- Dade City Police Department
- Davenport Police Department
- Davie Police Department
- Daytona Beach Police Department
- Daytona Beach Shores Department of Public Safety
- DeFuniak Springs Police Department
- DeLand Police Department
- Delray Beach Police Department
- Doral Police Department
- Eatonville Police Department
- Edgewater Police Department
- Edgewood Police Department
- El Portal Police Department
- Eustis Police Department
- Fellsmere Police Department
- Fernandina Beach Police Department
- Flagler Beach Police Department
- Florida City Police Department
- Fort Lauderdale Police Department
- Fort Myers Police Department
- Fort Pierce Police Department
- Fort Walton Beach Police Department
- Fruitland Park Police Department
- Gainesville Police Department
- Golden Beach Police Department
- Graceville Police Department
- Green Cove Springs Police Department
- Gretna Police Department
- Groveland Police Department
- Gulf Breeze Police Department
- Gulf Stream Police Department
- Gulfport Police Department
- Haines City Police Department
- Hallandale Beach Police Department
- Havana Police Department
- Hialeah Police Department
- Hialeah Gardens Police Department
- High Springs Police Department
- Highland Beach Police Department
- Hillsboro Beach Police Department
- Holly Hill Police Department
- Hollywood Police Department
- Holmes Beach Police Department
- Homestead Police Department
- Howey-In-The-Hills Police Department
- Indialantic Police Department
- Indian Creek Village Public Safety Department
- Indian Harbour Beach Police Department
- Indian River Shores Police Department
- Indian Shores Police Department
- Interlachen Police Department
- Jacksonville Beach Police Department
- Jacksonville Sheriff's Office
- Jasper Police Department
- Juno Beach Police Department
- Jupiter Inlet Colony Police Department
- Jupiter Island Public Safety Department
- Jupiter Police Department
- Kenneth City Police Department
- Key Biscayne Police Department
- Key Colony Beach Police Department
- Key West Police Department
- Kissimmee Police Department
- Lady Lake Police Department
- Lake Alfred Police Department
- Lake City Police Department
- Lake Clarke Shores Police Department
- Lake Hamilton Police Department
- Lake Mary Police Department
- Lake Placid Police Department
- Lake Wales Police Department
- Lakeland Police Department
- Lantana Police Department
- Largo Police Department
- Lauderhill Police Department
- Lawtey Police Department
- Leesburg Police Department
- Lighthouse Point Police Department
- Live Oak Police Department
- Longboat Key Police Department
- Longwood Police Department
- Lynn Haven Police Department
- Madison Police Department
- Maitland Police Department
- Manalapan Police Department
- Marco Island Police Department
- Margate Police Department
- Marianna Police Department
- Mascotte Police Department
- Medley Police Department
- Melbourne Beach Police Department
- Melbourne Police Department
- Miami Beach Police Department
- Miami Gardens Police Department
- Miami Police Department
- Miami Shores Police Department
- Miami Springs Police Department
- Midway Police Department
- Milton Police Department
- Miramar Police Department
- Monticello Police Department
- Mount Dora Police Department
- Naples Police Department
- Neptune Beach Police Department
- New Port Richey Police Department
- New Smyrna Beach Police Department
- Niceville Police Department
- North Bay Village Police Department
- North Miami Beach Police Department
- North Miami Police Department
- North Palm Beach Police Department
- North Port Police Department
- Oakland Police Department
- Ocala Police Department
- Ocean Ridge Police Department
- Ocoee Police Department
- Okeechobee Police Department
- Opa Locka Police Department
- Orange City Police Department
- Orange Park Police Department
- Orlando Police Department
- Ormond Beach Police Department
- Oviedo Police Department
- Palatka Police Department
- Palm Bay Police Department
- Palm Beach Gardens Police Department
- Palm Beach Police Department
- Palm Springs Police Department
- Palmetto Police Department
- Panama City Police Department
- Panama City Beach Police Department
- Parker Police Department
- Pembroke Park Police Department
- Pembroke Pines Police Department
- Pensacola Police Department
- Perry Police Department
- Pinecrest Police Department
- Pinellas Park Police Department
- Plantation Police Department
- Plant City Police Department
- Ponce Inlet Police Department
- Port Orange Police Department
- Port Richey Police Department
- Port St. Joe Police Department
- Port St. Lucie Police Department
- Punta Gorda Police Department
- Quincy Police Department
- Riviera Beach Police Department
- Rockledge Police Department
- Sanford Police Department
- Sanibel Police Department
- Sarasota Police Department
- Satellite Beach Police Department
- Sea Ranch Lakes Police Department
- Sebastian Police Department
- Sebring Police Department
- Sewalls Point Police Department
- Shalimar Police Department
- Sneads Police Department
- South Daytona Police Department
- South Miami Police Department
- Springfield Police Department
- St. Augustine Beach Police Department
- St. Augustine Police Department
- St. Cloud Police Department
- St. Petersburg Police Department
- Stuart Police Department
- Sunny Isles Beach Police Department
- Sunrise Police Department
- Surfside Police Department
- Sweetwater Police Department
- Tallahassee Police Department
- Tampa Police Department
- Tarpon Springs Police Department
- Tavares Police Department
- Temple Terrace Police Department
- Tequesta Police Department
- Titusville Police Department
- Treasure Island Police Department
- Trenton Department of Public Safety
- Umatilla Police Department
- Valparaiso Police Department
- Venice Police Department
- Vero Beach Police Department
- Virginia Gardens Police Department
- Wauchula Police Department
- Welaka Police Department
- West Melbourne Police Department
- West Miami Police Department
- West Palm Beach Police Department
- Wildwood Police Department
- Williston Police Department
- Wilton Manors Police Department
- Windermere Police Department
- Winter Garden Police Department
- Winter Haven Police Department
- Winter Park Police Department
- Winter Springs Police Department
- Zephyrhills Police Department

== University & College Agencies ==
- Florida Agricultural and Mechanical University Department of Campus Safety and Security
- Florida Atlantic University Police Department
- Florida Gulf Coast University Police Department
- Florida International University Police Department
- Florida Polytechnic University Police Department
- Florida Southwestern State College Department of Public Safety
- Florida State University Police Department
- New College of Florida/University of South Florida Sarasota-Manatee Campus Police Department
- Northwest Florida State College Police Department
- Pensacola State College Department of Public Safety
- Santa Fe College Police Department
- Tallahassee Community College Police Department
- University of Florida Police Department
- University of Central Florida Police Department
- University of Miami Police Department
- University of North Florida Police Department
- University of South Florida Police Department
- University of South Florida St. Petersburg Police Department
- University of West Florida Police Department

== School District Agencies ==
- Bay District Schools Department of Safety & Security
- Broward County Public Schools Special Investigative Unit
- Clay County District Schools Police Department
- Duval County School Police Department
- Florida School for the Deaf & the Blind Campus Police Department
- Miami-Dade Schools Police Department
- Nassau County Schools Department of Student Safety
- Orange County Public Schools District Police Department
- Palm Beach County School District Police Department
- Pinellas County Schools Police Department
- Putnam County School District Police Department
- Sarasota County Schools Police Department
- Washington County Schools/Florida Panhandle Technical College Department of Public Safety

== Airport Agencies ==
- Jacksonville Aviation Authority Police Department
- Lee County Port Authority Police Department
- Melbourne Airport Police Department
- Northwest Florida Beaches International Airport Police Department
- Sanford Airport Police Department
- Sarasota-Manatee Airport Authority Police Department
- Tampa International Airport Police Department

== Native American Tribe Agencies ==
- Miccosukee Police Department
- Seminole Police Department

== Railroad Police ==
- CSX Police Department
- Norfolk Southern Railroad
- Amtrak Police Department

== Private Corrections ==
- Bridges International
  - The Bradenton Bridge Community Release Center
  - The Cocoa Bridge Community Release Center
  - The Jacksonville Bridge Community Release Center
  - The Lake City Bridge Community Release Center
  - The Orlando Bridge Community Release Center
  - The Santa Fe Bridge Community Release Center
- CoreCivic
  - Citrus County Detention Facility
  - Lake City Youthful Offender Facility
- Correct Care Solutions
  - Florida Civil Commitment Center
  - South Florida Evaluation and Treatment Center
  - South Florida State Hospital
- Goodwill Industries-Suncoast, Inc.
  - Hillsborough County Residential Re-entry Center
  - St. Petersburg Suncoast Work-Release Center
- Management and Training Corporation
  - Gadsden Correctional Facility
- The GEO Group, Inc.
  - Bay Correctional Facility
  - Blackwater River Correctional Facility
  - Graceville Correctional Facility
  - Moore Haven Correctional Facility
  - South Bay Correctional Facility
- The Transition House, Inc.
  - The Transition House Bartow Work Release Center
  - The Transition House Dinsmore Work Release Center
  - The Transition House Kissimmee Work Release Center
  - The Transition House Tarpon Springs Work Release Center

== Disbanded Agencies ==
- Anna Maria Police Department - Disbanded in 1981, replaced by Manatee County Sheriff's Office
- Avon Park Police Department - Disbanded on October 1, 2012, replaced by Highlands County Sheriff's Office
- Baldwin Police Department - Disbanded on March 13, 2006, replaced by Jacksonville Sheriff's Office
- Belle Glade Police Department
- Brooksville Police Department
- Bushnell Police Department - Disbanded on September 30, 2012
- Callahan Police Department - Disbanded on January 21, 1981
- Callaway Police Department - Disbanded on July 10, 1992
- Cape Canaveral Police Department - Disbanded on November 1, 1977
- Cedar Grove Police Department - Disbanded on October 22, 2008
- Center Hill Police Department - Disbanded in 2021.
- Century Police Department
- Cooper City Police Department - Disbanded on January 13, 2004
- Crescent City Police Department - Disbanded February 2021.
- Crystal River Police Department - Disbanded on January 23, 2008
- Citrus County School District Police Department - Disbanded On April 14, 2026
- Dade County Sheriff's Office
- Dundee Police Department - Disbanded on October 1, 2008
- Dunedin Police Department - Disbanded on October 1, 1995
- Dunnellon Police Department - Disbanded April 2025
- Duval County Sheriff's Office - Consolidated with Jacksonville Police Department into formed the Jacksonville Sheriff's Office on October 1, 1968
- Eagle Lake Police Department - Disbanded on August 1, 2007
- Florida Department of Environmental Protection Division of Law Enforcement Bureau of Park Patrol - Merged with the Florida Fish and Wildlife Conservation Commission on July 1, 2012.
- Florida Department of Transportation Office of Motor Carrier Compliance - Merged with the Florida Highway Patrol on July 1, 2011.
- Florida Game and Freshwater Commission - Merged with Florida Fish and Wildlife Conservation Commission on July 1, 1999.
- Florida Marine Patrol - Merged with the Florida Fish and Wildlife Conservation Commission on July 1, 1999.
- Florida State Beverage Department
- Frostproof Police Department - Disbanded on November 1, 2006
- Greenacres Police Department
- Greensboro Police Department
- Hampton Police Department - Disbanded on February 27, 2014
- Hawthorne Police Department - Disbanded on January 1, 2009
- Horseshoe Beach Police Department - Disbanded on March 13, 1993
- Inverness Police Department - Disbanded on March 31, 2004
- Inglis Police Department - Disbanded on September 30, 2013
- Jackson District School Board Police Department - Disbanded in 2021
- Jacksonville Police Department - Consolidated with Duval County Sheriff's Office into formed the Jacksonville Sheriff's Office on October 1, 1968
- Lake Worth Police Department - Disbanded on September 30, 2008
- Lauderdale-By-The-Sea Police Department
- Macclenny Police Department - Disbanded on October 1, 1980
- Madeira Beach Police Department - Disbanded on September 16, 1995
- Mangonia Police Department
- Melbourne Village Police Department - Disbanded on August 18, 2022
- Mexico Beach Police Department - Disbanded on November 1, 2019
- Mulberry Police Department - Disbanded on June 1, 2009
- Oak Hill Police Department - Disbanded on August 1, 2011
- Okaloosa County Airports Police Department
- Panama City-Bay County International Airport Police Department - Disbanded on October 1, 2010
- Palm Beach Shores Police Department - Disbanded on October 31, 2019
- Pensacola Airport Police Department
- Pompano Beach Police Department
- Port Canaveral Police Department - Disbanded on September 30, 2014
- Polk City Police Department
- Orchid Police Department
- Royal Palm Beach Police Department - Disbanded on September 1, 2006
- South Bay Police Department
- South Palm Beach Police Department - Disbanded on October 1, 2019
- Starke police department
- Starke Police department disband in 2024
- St. Pete Beach Police Department - Disbanded on January 1, 2013
- Volusia County Beach Safety & Ocean Rescue - Law enforcement authority transferred to the Volusia County Sheriff's Office on May 1, 2023, agency now limited to EMT and lifeguard services on Volusia County beaches
- Waldo Police Department - Disbanded on October 1, 2014
- Webster Police Department - Disbanded on September 30, 2016
- University of Tampa Police
- White Springs Police Department - Disbanded 2021.
- West Tampa Police Department - Merged with Tampa Police Department in 1925, when City of West Tampa annexed into City of Tampa
- Zolfo Springs Police Department - Disbanded on August 1, 2010
