= TPD =

TPD or tpd may refer to:

== Science ==
- Temperature programmed desorption
- Theory of positive disintegration
- Time propagation delay

== Law ==
- Total permanent disability insurance
- Therapeutic Products Directorate in Canada
- Temporary Protection Directive in the European Union
- Tobacco Products Directive in the European Union

== Music ==
- The Tortured Poets Department, an album by Taylor Swift
- Tokyo Performance Doll, a J-pop girl group

== Organizations ==
- Tallahassee Police Department, Florida, US
- Tampa Police Department, Florida, US
- Titusville Police Department, Florida, US
- Tucson Police Department, Arizona, US
- Toronto Police Service, Ontario, Canada
- Torrance Police Department, California, US
- Tulsa Police Department, Oklahoma, US
- Victoria Transit Patrol, Melbourne, Australia

== Other ==
- Tamper proof device
- Ton per day, capacity specification for a pipeline
