= Martin County Sheriff's Office =

- Abbreviation: MCSO

Agency overview
- Formed: 1925

Jurisdictional structure
- Operations jurisdiction: Martin County, Florida, U.S.
- Legal jurisdiction: Martin County, Florida

Operational structure
- Headquarters: 800 SE Monterey Road, Stuart, Florida
- Agency executive: John M. Budensiek, Sheriff

Website
- www.mcsofl.org

The Martin County Sheriff's Office (MCSO) is the primary law enforcement agency for unincorporated areas of Martin County, Florida, and provides related services throughout the county. It is a full-service sheriff's office responsible for patrol, investigations, corrections, court services and a range of specialized operations. The agency was established in 1925, the same year Martin County was created, and marked its centennial in 2025. The current sheriff is John M. Budensiek, who took office in January 2025.

== History ==
Martin County was carved out of Palm Beach and St. Lucie counties in 1925. In the same year, the Martin County Sheriff's Office was created, with Bert H. Babcock appointed as the county's first sheriff. Early operations focused on basic rural law enforcement, including property crimes and maintaining order in a sparsely populated coastal county.

Over the following decades, the office expanded as Martin County's population grew, adding detectives, corrections functions and specialized units. By the late 20th and early 21st centuries, the sheriff's office operated aviation, marine, K-9, SWAT and bomb disposal units, along with community-oriented programs such as a Citizens Academy and outreach initiatives.

The agency’s history page lists a succession of sheriffs including Roy C. Baker (1952–1972), Robert L. Crowder (1972–1973; 1992–2013), James D. Holt (1973–1992), William D. Snyder (2013–2025) and John M. Budensiek (2025–present). Snyder, a former Miami-Dade Police Department officer and member of the Florida House of Representatives, was elected Martin County sheriff in 2012 and re-elected in 2016 and 2020 before announcing his retirement at the end of his term in 2025.

To mark its 100th anniversary, the MCSO hosted a "Walk Through Time" centennial event in May 2025 featuring historical displays, archival photographs and exhibits on modern policing technology.

== Organization and jurisdiction ==
The Martin County Sheriff's Office is described as a full-service law enforcement agency serving all of Martin County, Florida. The sheriff is an independently elected constitutional officer under Florida law and is responsible for providing primary law enforcement services throughout the county, in addition to supporting municipal agencies.

According to the agency’s official overview, the sheriff’s office is organized into several departments and divisions, including Administration, Corrections and Law Enforcement, each with subordinate divisions and specialized units. Law enforcement functions include a criminal investigations division (with units such as a behavioral health unit and a real-time crime center) and a community operations division (covering court services, media relations and school resource officers). A special operations division oversees units such as aviation, K-9, marine patrol, SWAT, bomb disposal and hostage negotiation teams.

The sheriff also administers and operates the Martin County Jail and is responsible for detention and inmate services. The agency provides county-wide services such as civil and criminal process, crime-prevention and education programs, school crossing guards for the school district and victim-assistance services.

== Leadership ==
=== William D. Snyder ===
William D. Snyder, a former Miami-Dade Police Department officer, joined the Martin County Sheriff’s Office in the 1990s and rose through the ranks to become director of law enforcement before running for elected office. He served in the Florida House of Representatives from 2006 to 2012 and was then elected sheriff of Martin County in 2012, taking office in January 2013. Snyder announced in 2024 that he would not seek another term and would retire at the end of his third term in January 2025.

During his tenure, Snyder oversaw the agency’s response to several major incidents and implemented policy changes following internal scandals, including reforms to evidence handling and drug-testing procedures after the Steven O’Leary case.

=== John M. Budensiek ===
John M. Budensiek, a career deputy who joined the MCSO in 1997, served in roles including road-patrol deputy, narcotics detective, SWAT team member and commander and every supervisory rank within the office before becoming acting chief deputy. He was elected without opposition to succeed Snyder and was sworn in as Martin County’s ninth sheriff on 7 January 2025.

Budensiek has emphasized training, inter-agency cooperation and specialized response capabilities. In media interviews he has described the office’s role in high-risk incidents, including the arrest of Ryan Wesley Routh, the suspect in the 2024 attempted assassination of former president Donald Trump, as one of the most significant cases in the agency’s history.

== Notable incidents ==
=== False drug-arrest scandal ===
In 2019–2020, the sheriff's office faced widespread scrutiny after deputy Steven O'Leary was accused of falsifying drug arrests. Investigators later determined that substances he seized in numerous traffic stops and submitted as illegal drugs were often household items or legal products, affecting dozens of defendants whose charges were subsequently dropped. O'Leary was arrested and ultimately pleaded no contest to multiple counts including official misconduct, tampering with evidence and false imprisonment. In December 2021 he was sentenced in state court to 13 years' imprisonment.

Victims of the arrests filed civil lawsuits in federal court against O'Leary and Sheriff Snyder, alleging violations of civil rights and wrongful imprisonment. During O'Leary's sentencing hearing, Snyder testified that O'Leary was an "outlier" within the agency and described the case as one of the most serious breaches of trust he had seen in his career. News coverage reported that, in response, the sheriff's office introduced additional oversight of evidence submissions and expanded the use of field-testing equipment for suspected narcotics.

=== Arrest of Ryan Wesley Routh ===
On 15 September 2024, Martin County deputies stopped and arrested Ryan Wesley Routh on Interstate 95 after a multi-agency alert described him as a suspect in an attempted assassination of former president Donald Trump at a golf club in Palm Beach County. Federal prosecutors later charged Routh with attempting to kill a presidential candidate and related firearms offenses. A local television report quoted Sheriff Budensiek as calling the event one of the biggest cases in the agency’s history and highlighting the coordination between Martin County, Palm Beach County and federal agencies during the incident.

== Community programs ==
The MCSO operates community-oriented initiatives including crime-prevention and education programs, victim-assistance services and school-based programs, as well as a Citizens Academy intended to familiarize residents with sheriff’s office operations. The office also provides school crossing guards for the Martin County School District and conducts outreach through social media and public events such as its centennial "Walk Through Time".

== See also ==
- Martin County, Florida
- List of law enforcement agencies in Florida
