= 2026 Kissimmee killings =

Triple homicide in Florida, US

- Location: Kissimmee, Florida, US
- Date: January 17, 2026
- Attack type: Shooting, triple homicide
- Deaths: 3
- Victims: Robert Luis Kraft (69); Douglas Joseph Kraft (68); James Puchan (68)
- Accused: Ahmad Jihad Bojeh
- Charges: First-degree murder (3 counts)

On January 17, 2026, three men were killed in the Indian Point subdivision of Kissimmee, Florida, United States, while waiting for help with rental car trouble. All three were visiting Kissimmee for the Mecum Auctions car show; two of the victims were from Columbus, Ohio, while the third was from Howell, Michigan. Police arrested one suspect, who wounded another person five years beforehand in a gas station shooting, and charged him with three counts of first-degree murder.

== Shooting ==
At approximately 12:13 p.m. on January 17, the three men were standing outside their Airbnb rental home on Indian Point Circle. They were reportedly waiting for a replacement rental car because their original vehicle had broken down. While waiting for their new car in minutes, their neighbor, Ahmad Jiah Bojeh, approached the three men and fatally shot them one-by-one without any altercation nor physical interactions with the men. All three men were pronounced dead after deputies from the Osceola County Sheriff's Office arrived at the scene several minutes afterward.

== Suspect ==
Police arrested 29-year-old Ahmad Jihad Bojeh (born November 13, 1996), a longtime resident of Kissimmee who had been living in the Indian Point subdivision since as early as 2004. Between 2006 and 2022, the Osceola County Sheriff's Office received 41 calls for service at the Bojeh family home. Out of all 41 calls in total, 16 of them involved Ahmad personally, with many of which occurred while he was still a minor. Most of the calls were made by his father, who reported that Ahmad was being aggressive toward the family or refusing to attend school.

Bojeh had an extensive criminal history dating back to his first arrest on possession of drugs and paraphernalia at the age of 18 in 2014. His most serious arrest before the murders date back to May 13, 2021, when Bojeh was charged with attempted murder after firing a gun at vehicles outside a Wawa gas station on U.S. Route 192 in Kissimmee, injuring one person. Bojeh was released from jail on December 20, 2022, after the circuit judge pleaded him not guilty but ordered Bojeh to be placed on a conditional release plan. He was sent back to his home in Kissimmee but undergo outpatient mental health treatment at Park Place Behavioral Mental Health Facility in Kissimmee. During his court-mandated conditional release in August 2023, his case manager reported that he had found employment at a local McDonald's and was initially described as being "happy with his job" and compliant with his mental health treatment.

== Investigation ==
Exactly an hour after the shooting, Bojeh was taken into custody at his home by Osceola deputies, before recovering both .45 caliber and .38 caliber rounds at the scene. The two pistols found in his bedroom were noted to match the calibers of the shell casings found outside the rental home where the three men were killed. According to the arrest affidavit, Bojeh was highly uncooperative when officers spotted Bojeh. Bojeh yelled profanities and racial slurs at deputies, refused to comply with search warrants for DNA or blood samples and had to be physically restrained. Exactly a month after the killings, Bojeh was charged with three counts of first-degree murder as announced by State Attorney Monique Worrell.
