= Cocoa Police Department =

City law enforcement agency in Cocoa, Florida

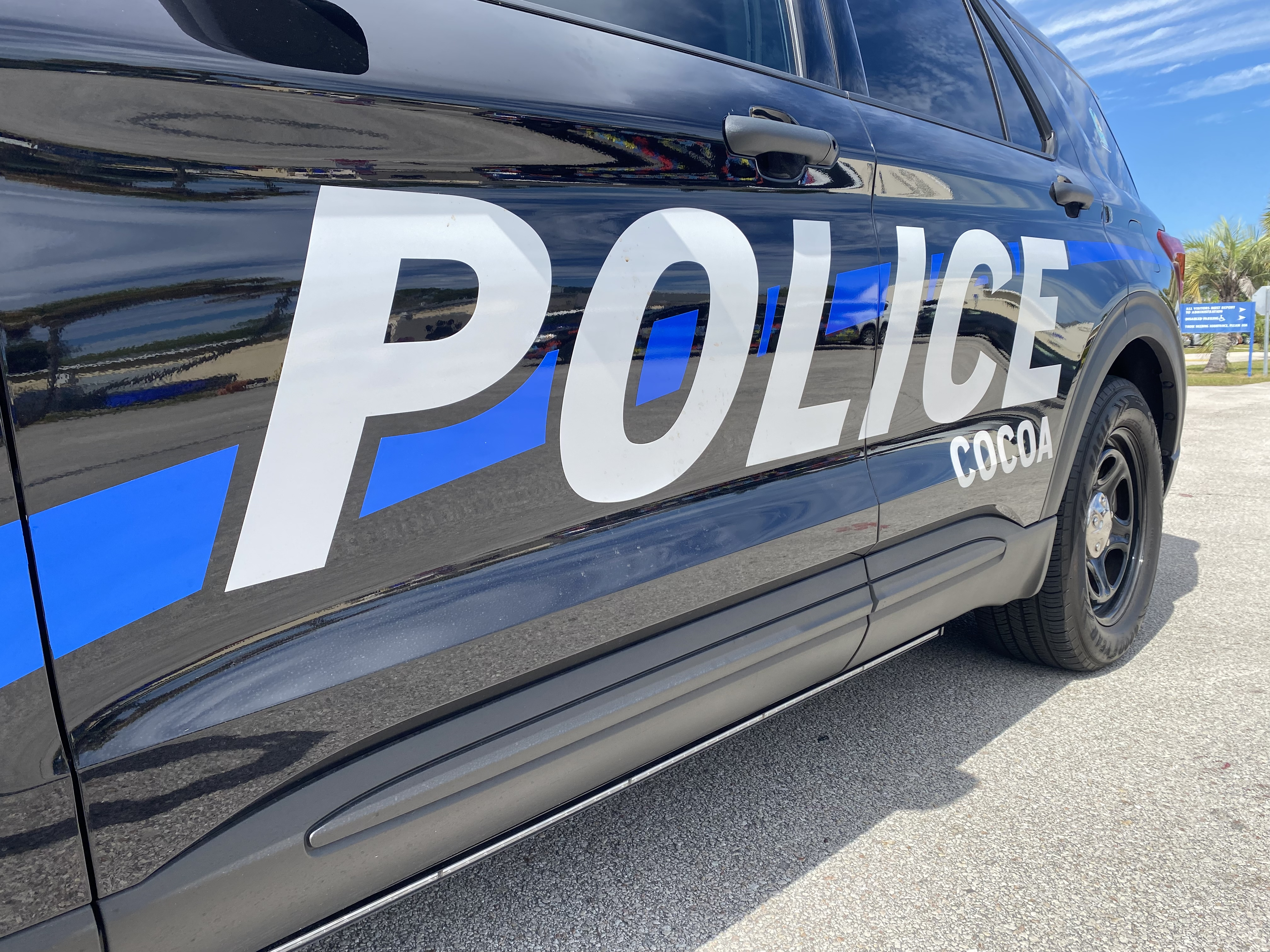
- Livery on CPD patrol utility vehicle

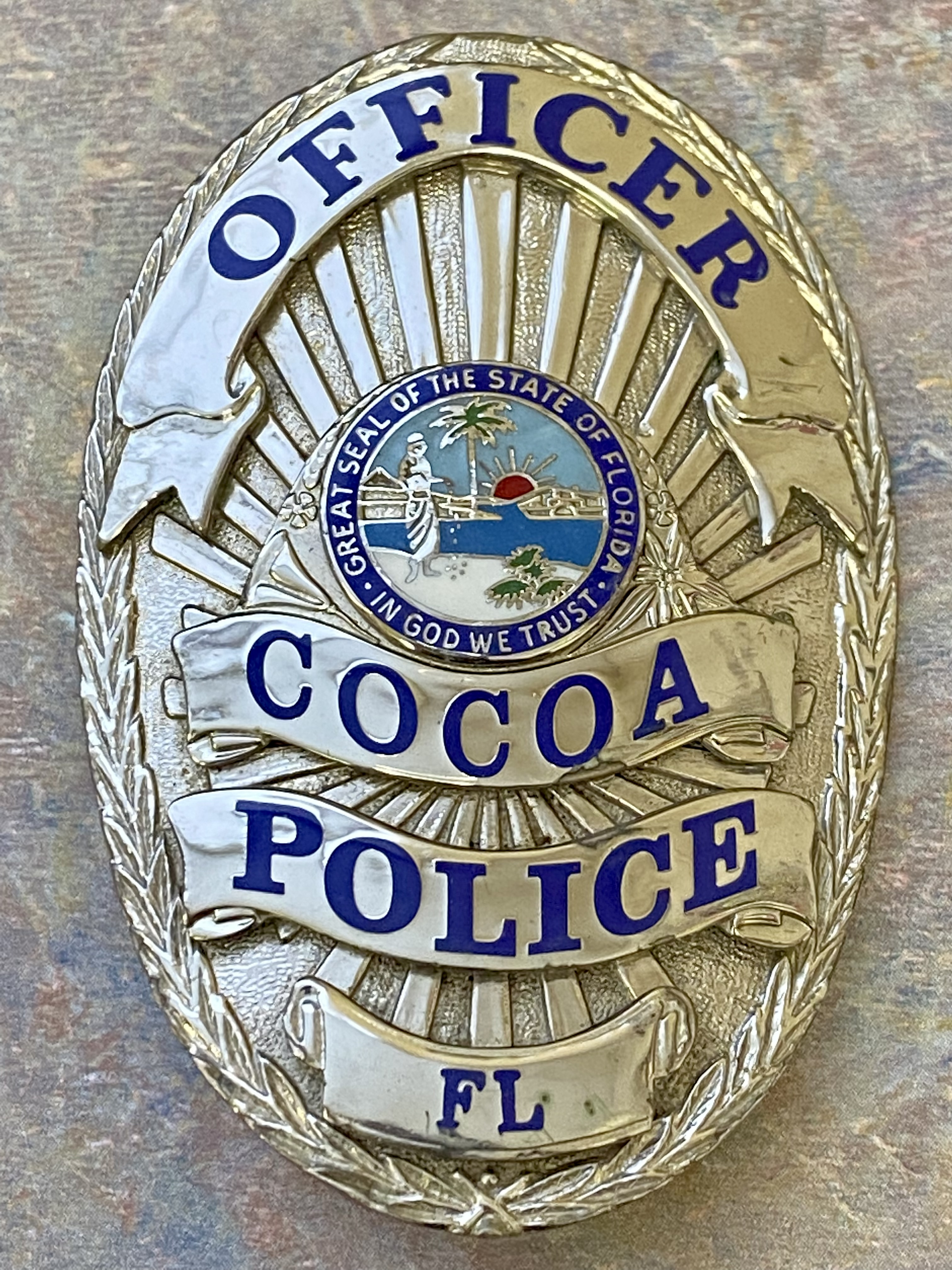
- Badge of the Cocoa Police Department
- Abbreviation: CPD

Agency overview
- Formed: 1895
- Annual budget: $9,460,643 (2020)

Jurisdictional structure
- Operations jurisdiction: Cocoa, Florida, USA
- CPD primary jurisdiction
- Area: 15.4 square miles (40 km^{2})
- Population: 19,041 (2020)
- General nature: Local civilian police

Operational structure
- Overseen by the State of Florida: Florida Department of Law Enforcement
- Headquarters: 1226 W. King Street Cocoa, Florida
- Sworn members: 72
- Agency executive: Evander Collier IV, Chief of Police

Facilities
- Stations: 1
- Holding cells: 4 adult cells; 1 juvenile
- Patrol cars: ~80
- Boats: 1
- Police dogs: 5

Website
- Cocoa Police Department

The Cocoa Police Department (CPD) is the primary law-enforcement agency for the city of Cocoa, Florida, and is accredited through the state of Florida. The department services approximately 19,000 residents within 15.41 sq miles (39.91 sq km) of the municipality. The department also serves roughly 2,500 non-residents who commute daily to the municipality for employment.

The City of Cocoa has consistently been in the top ten "most dangerous" cities within the state of Florida. As of 2020 the city was listed at No. 6, eclipsing the nearby metropolitan cities of Orlando (#20), Miami, and Jacksonville, with neither Miami nor Jacksonville in the top 25. The Department has authorized staffing of one officer per 264 residents (not including transient workers, visitors, or tourists). This equates to approximately 4 officers per 1,000 residents, in contrast to the national average of 2.4 officers per 1,000 residents. The city and national figures also include sworn officers not regularly assigned to road patrol (e.g., detectives, school resource officers, command staff, etc.).

Notwithstanding the reported criminal demographics, the City of Cocoa contains populations of varying socioeconomic stratum. The police department patrols areas along the Indian River with homes valuing in excess of $2 million. The north of the city is home to SpaceX and other private and government facilities. A limited-access freeway, The Orlando-Port Canaveral Beachline, runs through the northern section of the municipality from I-95 to the city's eastern limits in the middle of the Indian River. Because this approximate five-mile stretch lies within city limits, the Cocoa Police also act as a highway patrol, conducting traffic enforcement and responding to all motor vehicle collisions. Brightline constructed the first high-speed rail in Florida, which runs through the north of the city, along the aforementioned Beachline Freeway. Since operations began in 2023, the police department also acts as a railway police, until another governmental agency assumes the responsibility.

== Agency overview ==
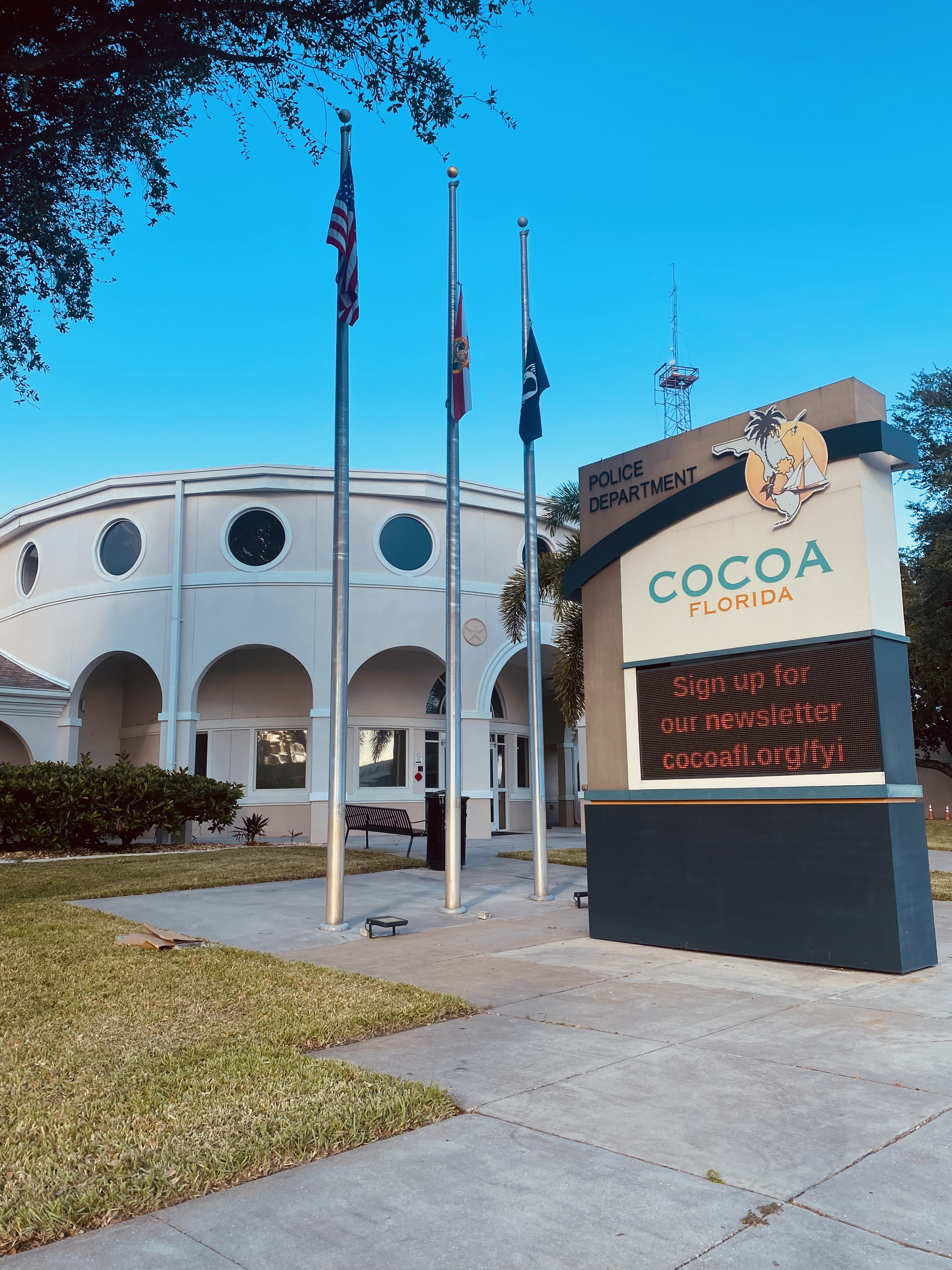
Main entrance to the Cocoa Police Department, as seen from King Street.

The Cocoa Police Department has an authorized force of 72 sworn officers, 16 telecommunications (dispatch) officers, 3 records technicians, 2 booking officers, and numerous other crime scene investigators and support personnel. The department has been accredited since 2006 through the Commission for Florida Law Enforcement Accreditation.

Headquartered just west of Cocoa Village, the CPD is a progressive agency, with multiple specialty units. The CPD contains a criminal investigations division (CID), professional compliance unit (internal affairs), traffic homicide investigators, SWAT, a K9 unit, motor unit, crisis negotiations team (CNT), a marine unit, school resource officer (SRO) unit, and a community engagement unit (CEU). The K9 unit has four patrol dogs and one black and tan coonhound used for therapy and tracking. The SRO unit has four officers, one at each charter and public school within the city. The CEU is authorized four officers and a sergeant, responsible for community engagement and policing.

The CPD also has an intelligence analyst, two victim advocates, and a civilian public information officer who disseminates information to the public via social media and traditional media. The department has a number of citizen volunteers who assist with administrative and logistical issues. The code enforcement office of the City operates under the auspices of the police department, as well. The code enforcement office is authorized one code enforcement manager, with two subordinate enforcement officers.

Analogous to the auxiliary and reserve components of the United States Armed Forces, the Cocoa Police Department has several similar variations: "VCOPs" (citizen volunteers), auxiliary police officers, and reserve police officers.

- Citizen volunteers are non-sworn personnel, who have attended a specialized training course and consent to a background investigation. Although the citizen volunteers have no police authority, they assist with logistical and administrative duties (such as traffic and crowd control at special events).
- Auxiliary officers are unpaid volunteers that have specialized training, are authorized to carry firearms, and authorized to make arrests when working under the direct supervision of a sworn, full-time paid officer, or reserve officer.
- Reserve officers are classified as "part-time officers" under Florida statute. In Cocoa, reserve officers are unpaid, fully sworn law enforcement officers that have gone through the exact same training, have the same authority as full-time officers, and may work without the supervision of a paid officer. Reserve officers are "qualified law enforcement officers," identical to full-time officers, and have the same LEOSA privileges as paid officers. As such, they are authorized to carry firearms on/off duty throughout the United States and its territories, the same as their full-time counterparts.

=== Divisions ===
As described by the agency, the Cocoa Police Department is subdivided into the following divisions:

- Administration- contains the Office of the Chief, professional compliance, public affairs
- Investigations- contains Criminal and Special Investigations Division (CID/SID, detectives and agents), Criminal Intelligence Analysis, Property and Evidence, Crime Scene Technologists, and Victim Services
- Operations- contains Patrol, SWAT, Crisis Negotiations, K-9, School Resource Unit, Community Engagement Unit, Traffic Enforcement Unit, Training, Crossing Guards, Police Athletic League, and V-COPs
- Support Services- contains Accreditation Compliance, Budget and Finance, Telecommunications, Grants Management, and Records

=== Jurisdiction ===
Although sworn members of the Cocoa Police Department have primary jurisdiction within the incorporated municipal limits of the city, Florida state statute permits law enforcement agencies to enter into mutual aid agreements with each other. The Brevard County Sheriff's Office has entered into a mutual aid agreement with the City of Cocoa (as well as other incorporated municipalities within Brevard County that have their own police departments). This mutual aid agreement stipulates (among other things): "...(the officers) shall have the power to make any and all arrests and otherwise act with full authority as a law enforcement officer in the jurisdictional area of the other agency." The mutual aid agreement also permits off-duty law enforcement actions, in conjunction with departmental policies. Furthermore, some sworn members in specialized units (e.g., federal or local task forces) may also be cross-deputized as federal agents, deputy sheriffs, or both.

=== Union representation ===
Unlike some other US states (such as those in the northeastern United States), the State of Florida is a "right-to-work" state. In states without such right-to-work laws, sworn officers of law enforcement agencies can not opt out of joining labor unions. Sworn officers of the Cocoa Police Department of the rank of lieutenant and below have the option of joining a labor union. As of 2022, the current labor union representing the Cocoa Police Department is the Florida Police Benevolent Association (PBA). The local chapter servicing Cocoa officers is called the Coastal PBA.

== History ==
=== 19th century ===
Created with the incorporation of Cocoa in 1895, the Cocoa Police Department was initially called the "Office of the Marshal," led by an elected town marshal. The department's responsibilities were not only keeper of the peace, but also to collect taxes. The first marshal, George Lynch, was nominated and elected without opposition. The salary of the town marshal was $40 per month ($1,303 in 2021 dollars), plus $1 ($33) per conviction of a civil infraction that was paid in full by the offender. After six months, Lynch resigned from his position and was replaced by an appointed interim marshal, James Payne. Internal politics had Payne replaced and reappointed several times, into the new century. In October 1927, the elected position of town marshal/tax collector was abolished, and replaced with an appointed chief of police.

=== Great Depression ===
In May 1929, it was reported by local media that the department purchased its first motorized vehicle, a Ford "Touring Car" with the words "Police-City of Cocoa" painted on the sides. Prior to the start of the Great Depression in 1929, the salary of the police chief was $200 per month ($3,156 in 2021 dollars) and $140 ($2,209) for the night patrolman. After the stock market crash, by 1932 the chief's salary was decreased by half to $100 per month ($1,986), with the patrolman's salary falling to $90 ($1,787) per month.

=== World War II and Cold War-era ===
By the early 1940s, the department had grown to four officers and purchased its first motor bike, a two-cylinder motorcycle operated by Officer L.W. Silsby. On October 23, 1945, the department hired its first "colored policeman", E.G. Harvey, who policed the "colored" population and stayed with the department for at least ten years. By 1949, the department had increased to six officers, and purchased two General Electric 50-watt two-way police radios. A police phone booth was erected within the department, as well as in the local community.

On July 9, 1954, the department recorded its first (and only, to date) line-of-duty death. Although anecdotal reports conflict, the department's website officially indicates that a lieutenant reportedly succumbed to a self-inflicted gunshot wound. Department records described the lieutenant "was shot with his own service revolver in an apparent accidental self-inflicted incident."

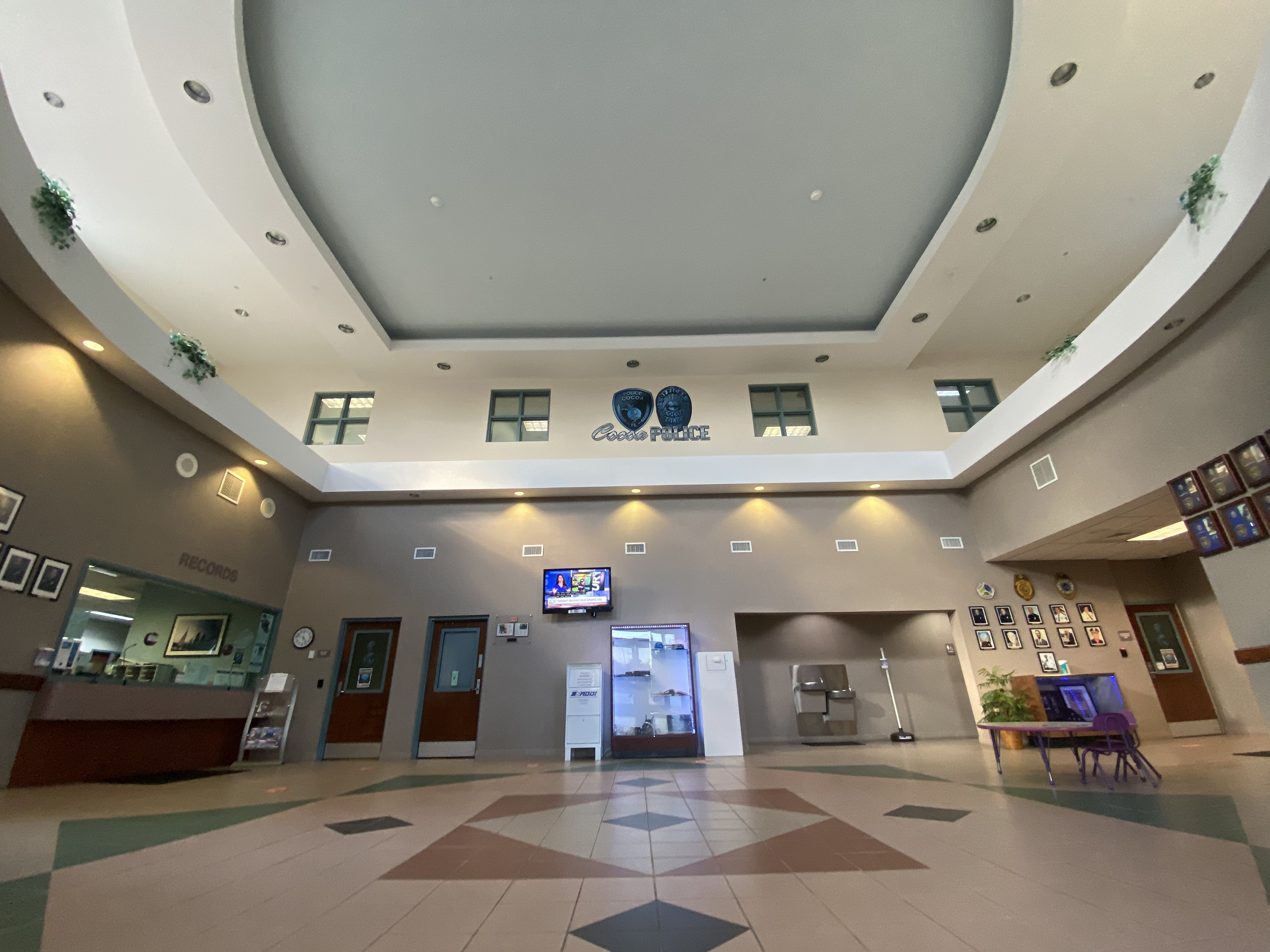
Inside the main entrance atrium of the current police department headquarters. Reception and records are prominently displayed to the left.

The longest-sitting chief of police was Chief Art Corlew. Corlew was initially hired with the department in 1952 as a parking meter patrolman. By January 1958, Patrolman Corlew was Chief of Police Corlew. At this time, Corlew authorized the City's first "policewoman", Doris Adkins. Adkins initially served as parking meter enforcement. Records indicate that Adkins was hired on Monday, February 10, 1958, and was compensated with an annual salary of $3000 ($28,176 in 2021 dollars). Corlew retired in 1983. Out of his 31-year career, Corlew served as chief for 25 years. Over the next approximate 15 years, another 5 chiefs would lead the department, with one involved in alleged gambling and racketeering charges.

=== Turn of the century and today ===
In 1999, the department relocated to a new purpose-built facility, and its current location. The department had been located on Brunson Boulevard since 1964. Prior to 1964, the police department was located within the city hall (which, at the time, was located on Willard Drive, unlike its current location on Stone Street in downtown Cocoa Village). In 2003 the department began its application for state accreditation, which was completed three years later, in 2006. In 2021, the City of Cocoa hired its first African-American police chief, Evander Collier IV, a retired assistant chief from the Jacksonville Sheriff's Office.

== Community policing and outreach ==
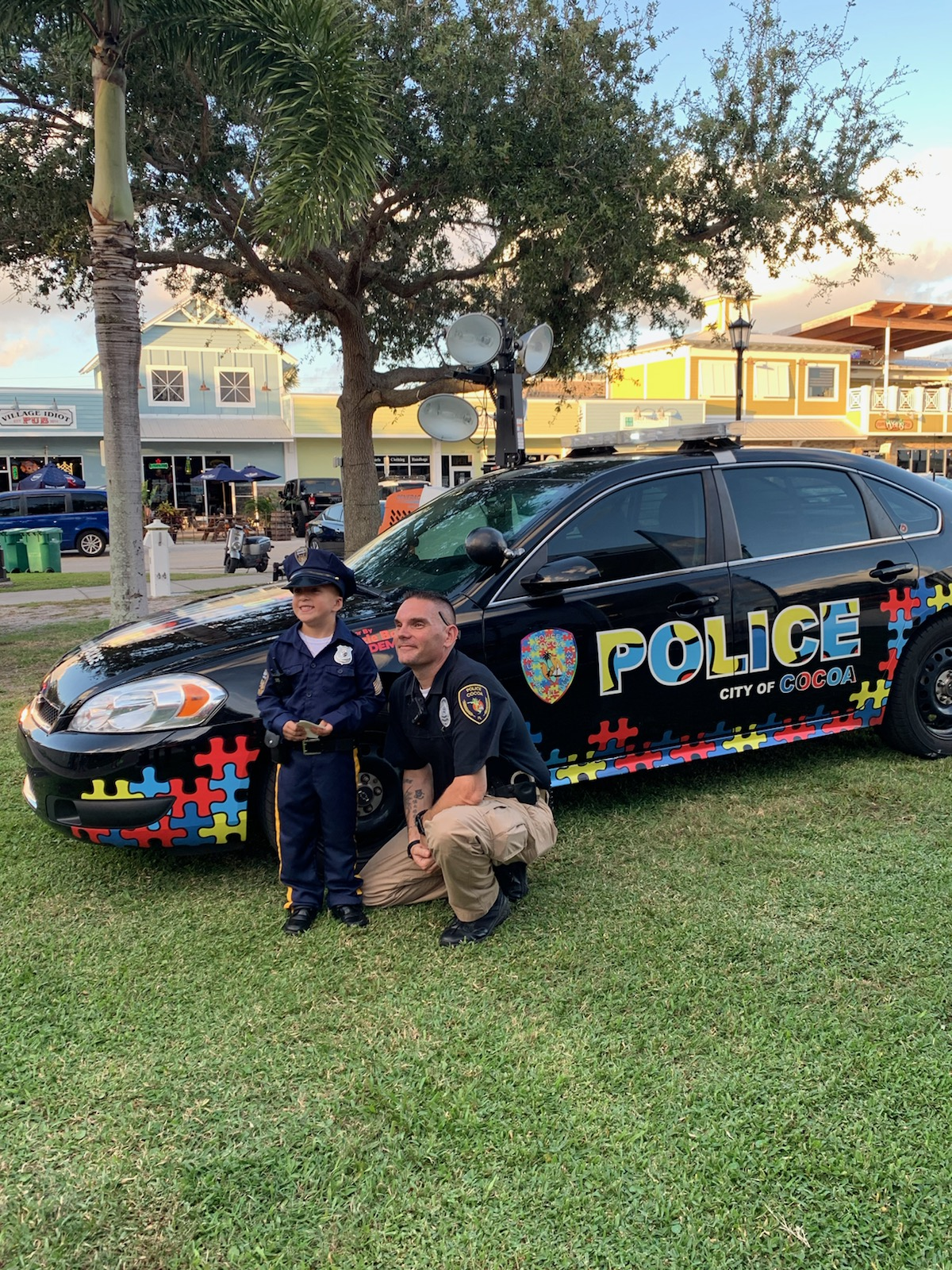
A City of Cocoa police officer poses with a child next to a patrol car with the "Autism Awareness" livery at a community event in Cocoa Village.

Like many other agencies in the United States, the Cocoa Police Department is amid a paradigm shift to more progressive philosophies (relative to past national practices) by using community policing. Not to be confused with neighborhood watch, community policing is a philosophy of policing based on the social theory of Structural functionalism. Structural functionalism postulates that parts of a social system should work together to promote solidarity and stability. Specifically, this policing theory involves a policy of relationship-building which is proactive, responsive, and highly personal between the residents and government officials. Community policing is problem-oriented, intelligence-led, and reciprocal. As of 2021, department leadership has made a policy of employing this functionalist-style of community-oriented policing.

In an effort to facilitate community policing theory, members of the CPD and other volunteers operate multiple programs aimed at community involvement. One such program is a nonprofit organization called Cocoa Community First. Cocoa Community First is a federally registered 501(c)(3) organization, which is described to be "dedicated to supporting the youth and community outreach programs in the City of Cocoa and surrounding areas." Among other events, the non-profit organization funds department-assisted functions such as: the Cocoa Police Athletic League, Cops and Kids Summer Youth Program, Shop with a Cop, Holiday Toy Drive, and other community outreach endeavors. The aforementioned Community Engagement Unit acts as the agency liaison.

The City of Cocoa Police Athletic League (PAL, also, Police Activities League) is a local chapter of the national Police Athletic Activities League, Inc. The national organization website describes its mission is to "... [promote] the prevention of juvenile crime and violence by building relationships among kids, cops, and community through positive engagement". Cocoa's local chapter provides year-long mentorship to city youth.

The "Cops and Kids" summer youth program is a summer camp sponsored and operated by a joint cooperation of the Cocoa Police Athletic League, Cocoa Community First, and personnel/logistical support from the Cocoa Police Department and Lifetime Counseling Center. The combined efforts of the program provide disenfranchised youth with mentoring, counseling (from licensed clinical social workers), a structured learning environment, breakfast and lunch, and field trips to local venues such as swimming facilities, museums, and parks. The summer program usually culminates with a trip to one of the theme parks in Orlando (e.g., Walt Disney World, Aquatica, Wekiwa Springs State Park, etc). Participants are bussed to the theme park, chaparoned by police officer volunteers and social workers throughout the day. The program is provided at no cost to participants or their parents/guardians.

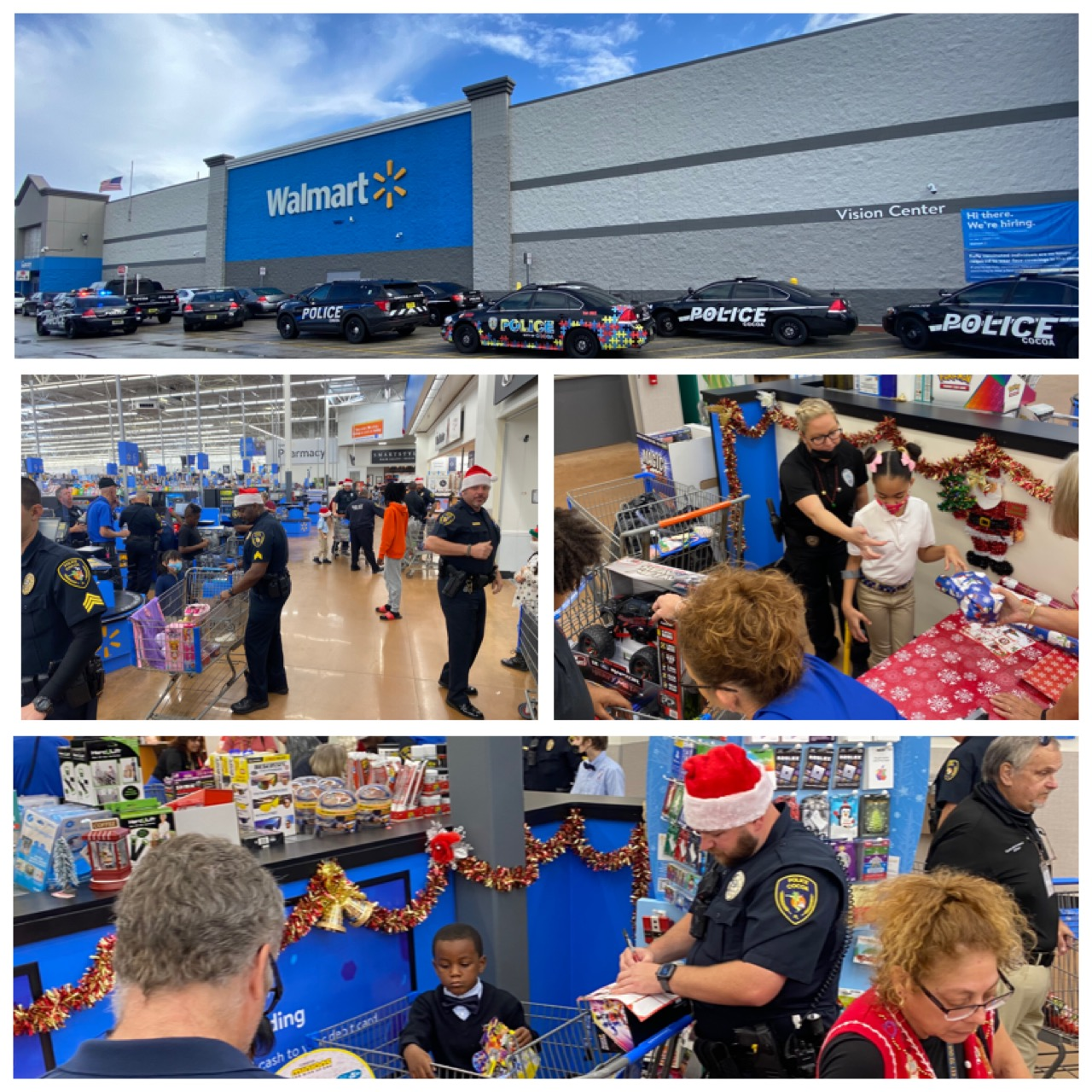
Collage of Cocoa Police "Shop with a Cop" Christmas event in 2021

=== Back-to-School and Holiday Toy Drives ===
The Holiday Toy Drive, and the Back-to-School Drive are annual events co-sponsored by the department to assist local families. The holiday relief is in the form of clothes, toys, and food. The back-to-school portion provides relief for families of students returning to school prior to the start of the new school year. The department coordinates with the local Walmart to facilitate events. Upon receipt of the gifted supplies, the department separates and delivers the school equipment and supplies to all of the local schools.

=== Shop with a Cop ===
Shop with a Cop is a Christmas event in which the department coordinates with the local schools to select students-in-need. The selected students are picked up from their schools, and transported to the local Walmart in a "VIP-style" police escort. Upon arrival at Walmart, the students are greeted with a standing ovation from Walmart staff, after which, each of the students are handed a gift card valued at $100, where they can purchase Christmas gifts for themselves and their family. Upon completion, Walmart staff and volunteers wrap all the purchased items and place them into a large bag for the children to bring home to their families.

== Rank structure ==
The Cocoa Police Department, like many other American law enforcement agencies, is para-military in nature and its personnel is sub-divided into a ranked hierarchy. Unlike the military, however, it is not uncommon for officers to go their entire career without being "promoted", per se. Officers may not want to work in an administrative capacity, but may instead choose to make lateral moves to specialized units, and complete their career.

The following is the rank structure:

Rank	Insignia	Description
Chief of Police		The Chief of Police is the highest-ranking law enforcement officer of the Cocoa Police Department, and is held accountable by the city manager. The chief's rank insignia are four, gold five-pointed stars.
Deputy Chief of Police		The Deputy Chief of Police is the second-highest ranking officer and is responsible for the day-to-day activities of the Cocoa Police Department. The Deputy Chief is held accountable by the Chief of Police. The Deputy Chief's rank insignia are two, gold five-pointed stars. (As of 2022, this position is vacant).
Commander		The Commander is in control of a division, and reports to the Chief of Police. The Commander may act as Chief or Deputy Chief in his/her absence. The commander's rank insignia is a single, gold five-pointed star.
Major		The rank insignia of a major is a gold oak leaf. (As of 2022, this position is vacant.)
Lieutenant		The Watch Commander is in charge of patrol and/or support services, and may serve as an acting Major or Commander. The rank insignia is symbolized by a single gold bar.
Sergeant		A squad sergeant may serve as an acting lieutenant and is in charge of a squad of police officers at the rank of corporal and below. The sergeant's rank is symbolized by three gold chevrons bordered by a black background. Sergeants are selected from a testing process.
Corporal		A corporal is a first-line supervisor. A corporal may serve as an acting sergeant. The rank insignia of a corporal is symbolized by two gold chevrons bordered by a black background. Corporals are selected before a board of supervisors.
Field Training Officer		The rank of Field Training Officer is awarded as a promotion, and is bestowed to officers who have completed their probationary period, have shown superior proficiency in the field, the ability to train, and are selected before a board of senior officers and supervisors.
Officer		Upon completion of background investigation and final offer of employment, recruits successfully completing the police academy are appointed as a Police Officer, "Officer".
Cadet		Trainees are known as cadets while attending the police academy.

== Vehicles ==
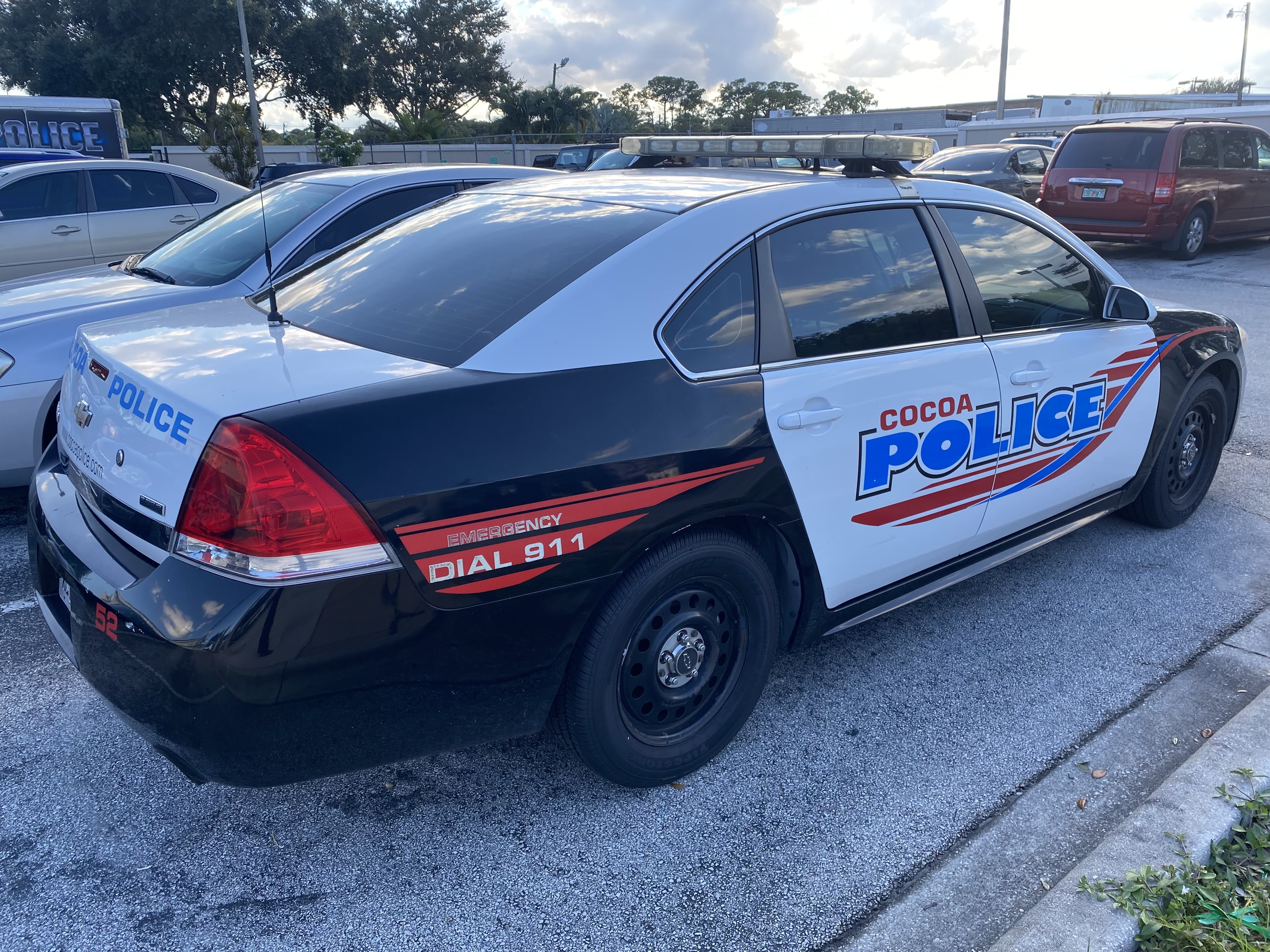
Previous black and white livery, with "police-and-swoosh" logo reminiscent of Washington, DC Police patrol cars.

The Cocoa Police Department uses several styles of vehicles for their operations. As with most American law enforcement agencies, the department mainly purchases domestically produced vehicles. Previously, the CPD used a LAPD-style "black-and-white" livery. The current vehicles are mostly solid black with white letters, with a few specialty vehicles displaying solid white body paint with black letters. Other vehicles used by the command staff and the Criminal Investigations Division (CID) are unmarked of various colors, although still containing two-way radio communications, siren, and interior emergency-vehicle red and/or blue lighting. The department also maintains an unmarked Ford Transit prisoner transport van.

Chevrolet is no longer producing the Impala, so the agency is currently transitioning from a patrol fleet of primarily Impalas to primarily Ford Police Interceptor Explorers. Because of the nature of police work, and the amount of gear and equipment required of law enforcement, the utility-style vehicle has become increasingly popular with law enforcement agencies. This agency will eventually transition to a patrol fleet primarily consisting of SUVs. In keeping with eco-friendly trends, the CPD has begun to purchase all-electric vehicles, as well as hybrid electric vehicles. In keeping with cultural trends, the agency also has a specialty patrol car emblazoned with multi-colored puzzle pieces, in support of people with autism spectrum disorder. The unique wrapping was sponsored by a local organization that specializes in the treatment and scholastic education of youth afflicted with the disorder. The specialty patrol car is used for special events and community outreach, as well as traditional patrol duties.

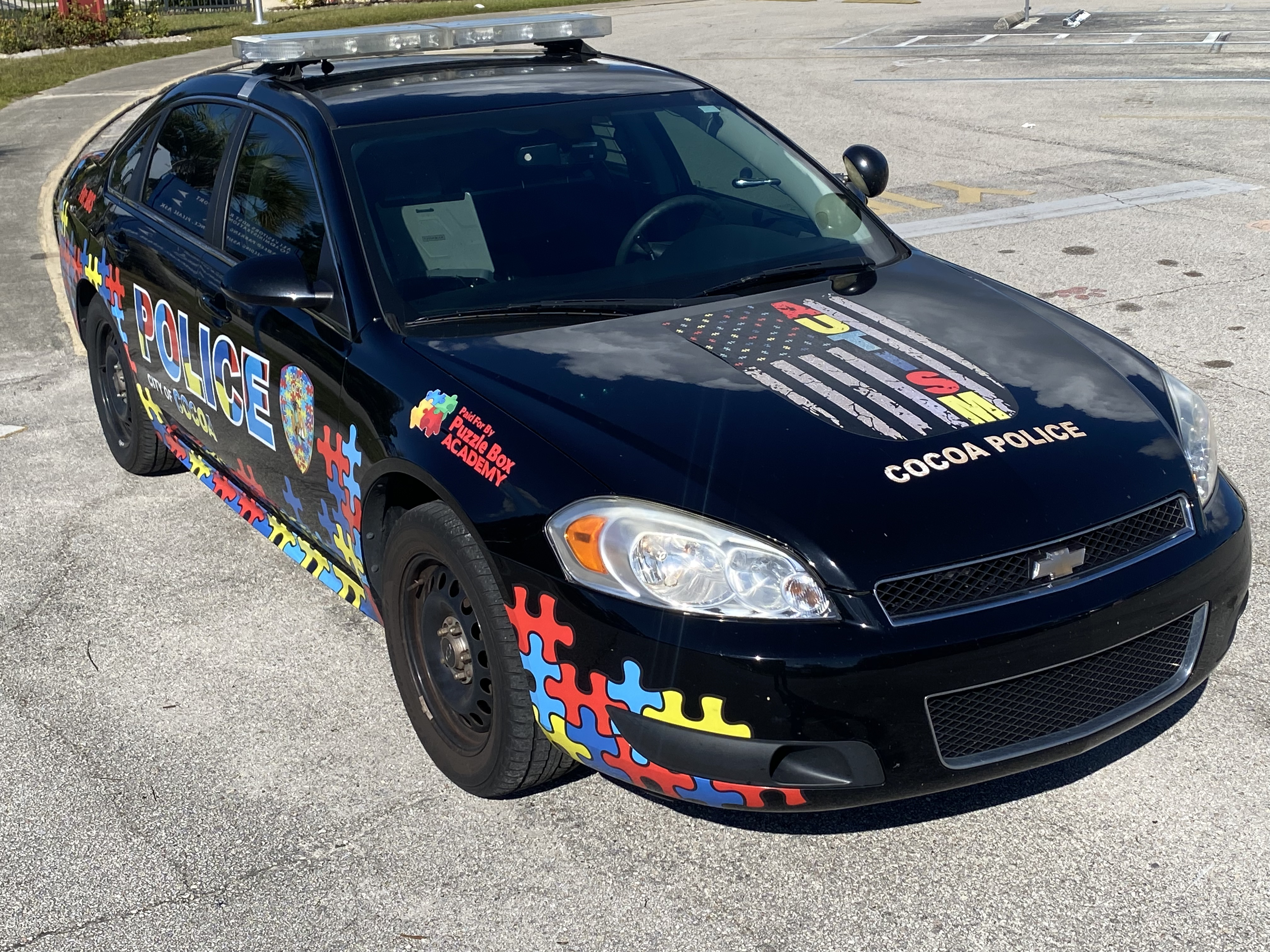
"Autism Awareness" specialty patrol car.

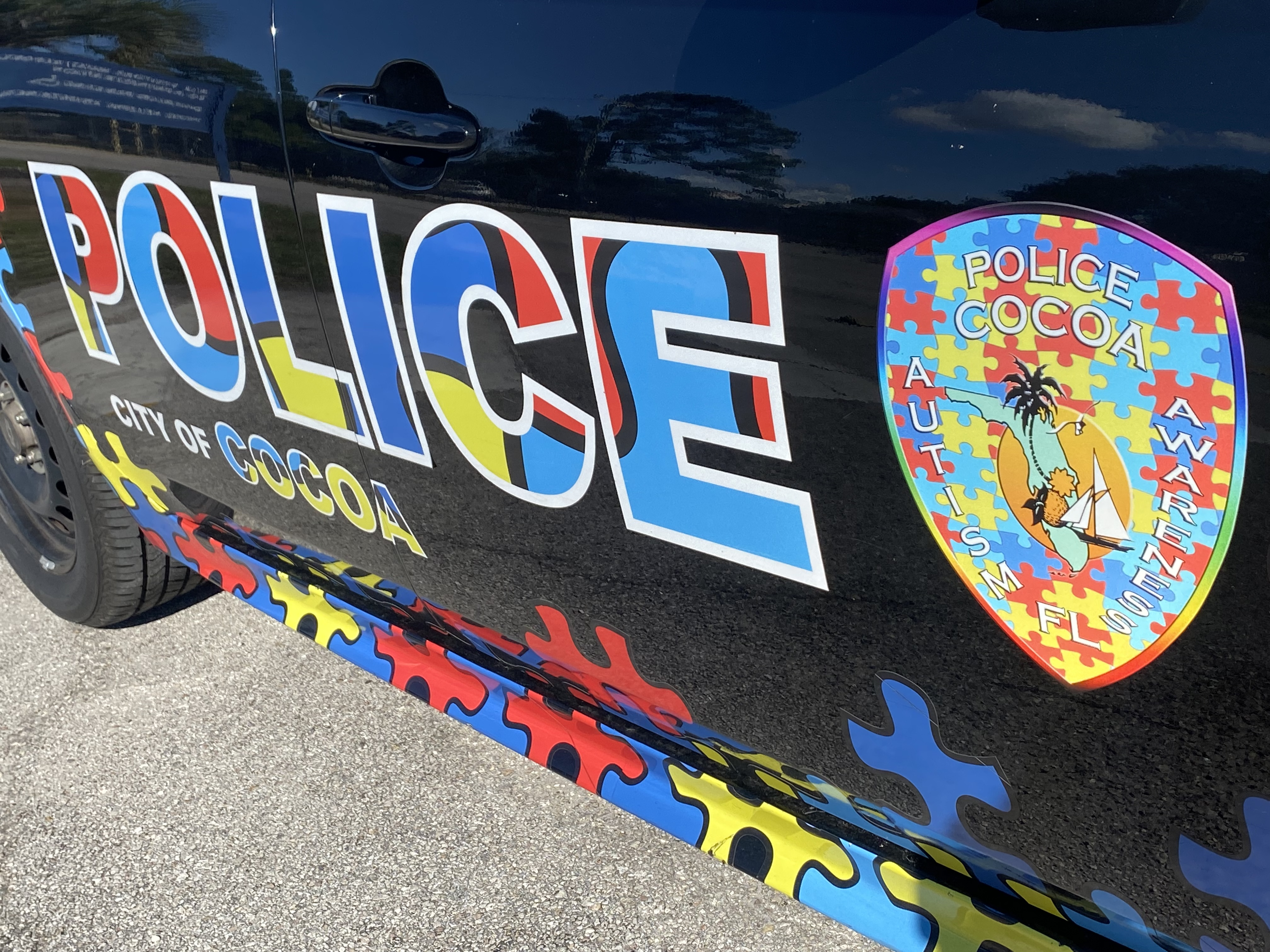
Livery with the autism-awareness police patch variant.

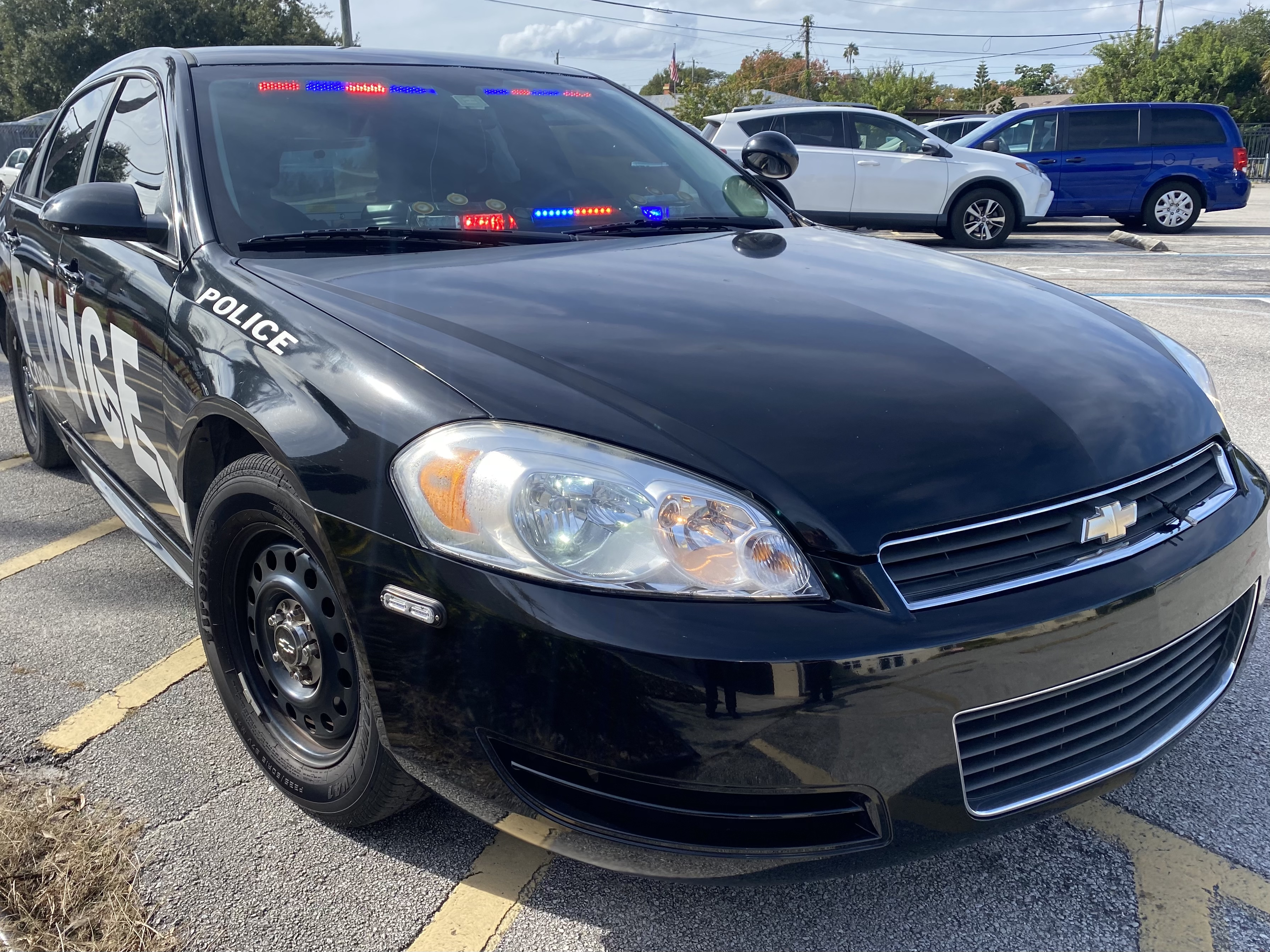
Marked patrol car without the exterior, overhead lightbar, colloquially called a "slick top". The interior emergency lights are activated.

The department's Traffic Enforcement Unit (or simply "Traffic Unit") maintains two Harley-Davidson (HD) motorcycles (in addition to the standard patrol cars used for traffic enforcement). Unit members are sworn officers who are certified traffic homicide investigators. A "Motors" sub-unit is for members who are also certified as a motorcycle operator, and use the Harley-Davidson Police Electraglide which contains the Milwaukee-Eight 114 cu. in. (1868 cc) engine. The department currently has two sworn officers in the Motors Unit. In addition to enforcing Florida motor vehicle statutes, the Traffic Unit responds to all vehicle traffic collisions involving serious bodily harm or death, as well as providing motorcades for visiting dignitaries, funerals, special events, etc.

The agency also has a marine unit, responsible for water rescue, maritime law enforcement, and special water-borne events. The unit currently has one watercraft, acquired from the US Coast Guard, via the Law Enforcement Support Office's 1033 Program. The marine unit responds to natural disasters, BUI, personal health and hazards, or assisting other agencies (e.g., FWC, Brevard County Sheriff's Office, or the Coast Guard).

The following is a table of current departmental vehicles:

Vehicle	Country	Type
Ninth-generation Chevrolet Impala with General Motors' police package	United States (origin); Canada (manufacture)	Cruiser
Chevrolet Caprice PPV (based on sixth-generation civilian model from Holden)	United States (origin); Australia (manufacture)	Cruiser and K9 transport
Ford Police Interceptor Sedan (based on sixth-generation civilian model)	United States	Cruiser
Second-generation Ford Police Interceptor Utility (based on sixth-generation civilian model), hybrid-electric variant	United States	SUV cruiser and K9 transport
Harley-Davidson Police Electraglide	United States	Motorcycle cruiser
First-generation Chevrolet Bolt	United States (origin and final assembly); South Korea (infotainment, instrument, and information technology)	All-electric cruiser
Third-generation Ford Ranger	United States	Light truck cruiser
Third-generation Ford F-250 Super Duty	United States (Kentucky Truck Plant)	3/4 Ton light truck cruiser
Fourth-generation Ford Transit	United States	Prisoner transport

== Patrol districts ==
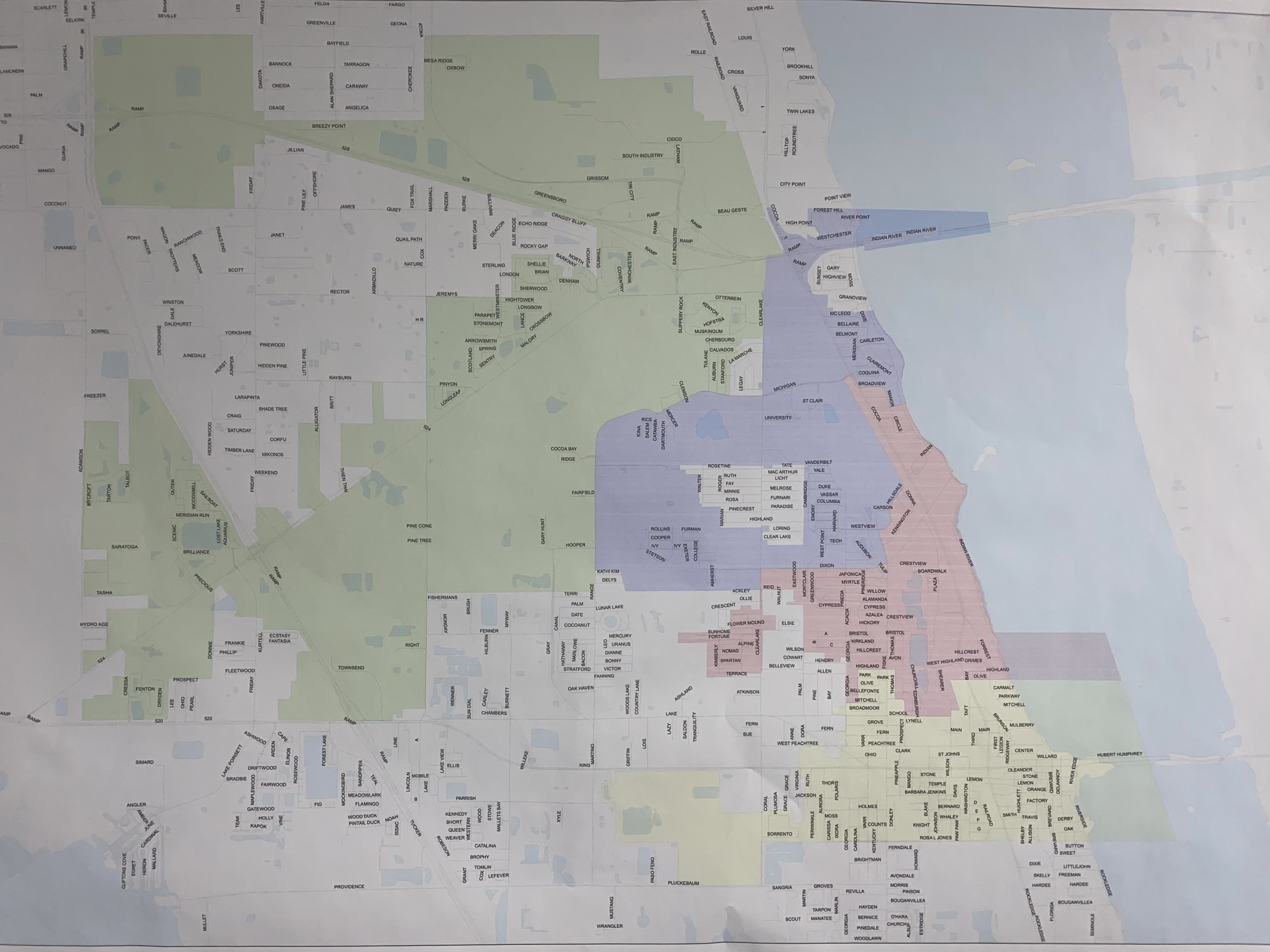
District map of the Cocoa Police Department. White represents unincorporated areas. Yellow is District I, pink is District II, green is District III, and blue is District IV.

The Cocoa Police Department is divided into four patrol districts. Each patrol district is commanded by a lieutenant and corresponds to the City of Cocoa's elected council representative district.

- District I includes all of Cocoa Village and areas directly adjacent to King Street.
- District II includes most of the City's area south of Dixon Blvd and along the Indian River Lagoon, north of Cocoa Village and south of Michigan Ave.
- District III includes all areas to the extreme north and west, including Interstate 95.
- District IV includes most areas north of Dixon Blvd, and along northern Clearlake Blvd.

== In popular culture ==
In early 2020, members from the Cocoa Police K9 Unit were flown to California to compete in episodes of a reality show competition, America's Top Dog. An agency K9 named "Bear" and his handler, Officer Dan Rhoades, won an episode and advanced to the finals. For the win, K9 Bear and his handler won $15,000. Of the reward, $10,000 was donated to the City of Cocoa's purse, with the remaining $5,000 donated to the Space Coast Police K9 competition through the police department's non-profit organization (Cocoa Community First). The donated money aided the local competition in increasing its scope and size.

== See also ==
- List of law enforcement agencies in Florida
- Brevard County, Florida
