= THI =

THI may refer to:

== Businesses and organisations ==
- Technische Hochschule Ingolstadt, a German university
- Texas Heart Institute, an American medical non-profit
- Tim Hortons Inc., a Canadian eatery chain

== Other uses ==
- Temperature-Humidity Index, in meteorology
- Thirsk railway station, England (by station code)
- Toomas Hendrik Ilves (born 1953), Estonian politician
- Traffic Homicide Investigator, in US law enforcement
- Tissue harmonic imaging, an ultrasonography technique

== See also ==
- Thi (disambiguation)
