= Thi =

Thi (Quốc ngữ: Thị; Hán-Nôm: 氏) is a Vietnamese name, usually given as a middle name to females (see: Vietnamese name). It may also refer to:

- City of Thi, a city in The Wizard of Oz
- thị, Vietnamese term for persimmons, specifically Diospyros decandra
- thi, a form of Kayan rice wine

== See also ==
- THI (disambiguation)
