= Naples Police Department =

Police department for the city of Naples, Florida

- Abbreviation: NPD

Agency overview
- Employees: 109
- Annual budget: US$17,136,515 (2023)

Jurisdictional structure
- Operations jurisdiction: Naples, Florida, US
- Area: 16.46 sq mi (42.5 km^{2})
- Population: 19,372 (2021)

Operational structure
- Headquarters: 355 Riverside Circle; Naples, Florida
- Elected officer responsible: Ciro Dominguez, Police Chief

Website
- www.naplesgov.com/police

Naples, Florida

The Naples Police Department (NPD) is the primary law enforcement agency of Naples, Florida, United States.

== Organization ==
Along with the regular patrol unit, police operations include sworn officers assigned to special assignments, including criminal investigations, traffic enforcement, marine patrol, a K-9 team, community policing, crime prevention and bicycle patrols. The Patrol Division consists of four uniform patrol squads who work 12-hour shifts. Each patrol squad consists of eight officers and one sergeant. Two of these squads comprise the day shift patrol operations which are complemented by various specialty units. The other two squads make up the night shift patrol operations which also includes a K-9 team. Each patrol shift has a support sergeant and a lieutenant who oversees the overall shift operations. The patrol division is assigned the task of responding to a variety of calls for service.

== See also ==
- List of United States state and local law enforcement agencies
- List of law enforcement agencies in Florida
