= Charlotte County Sheriff's Office =

Law enforcement agency in Florida, US

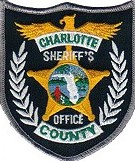
- Patch of the Charlotte County Sheriff's Office

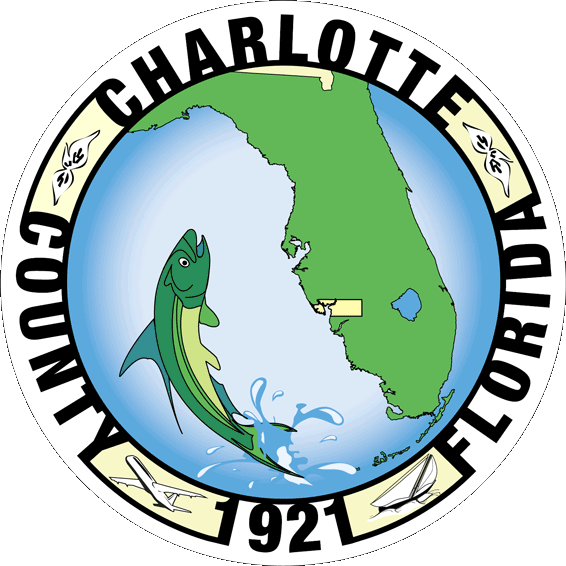
- Seal of Charlotte County, Florida
- Abbreviation: CCSO
- Motto: Integrity, Professionalism, Trust

Agency overview
- Formed: 1921
- Annual budget: US$79,435,755

Jurisdictional structure
- Operations jurisdiction: Charlotte, Florida, US
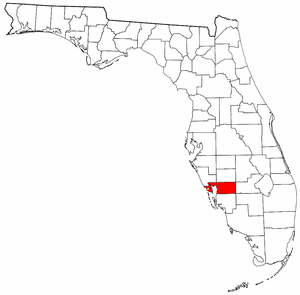
- Map of Charlotte County Sheriff's Office's jurisdiction
- Area: 858 square miles (2,220 km^{2})
- Population: 188910
- Legal jurisdiction: Charlotte County, Florida
- General nature: Local civilian police

Operational structure
- Headquarters: 7272 Utilities Road, Punta Gorda, Florida 33982
- Agency executive: William Prummell (R), Sheriff

Facilities
- Districts: 4
- Jails: 1

Website
- Official Site

The Charlotte County Sheriff's Office (CCSO) is a law enforcement agency in Charlotte County, Florida, headquartered at 7474 Utilities Road, Punta Gorda, Florida. The current sheriff is Bill Prummell, who was elected in 2012. The CCSO covers all of Charlotte County, including the City of Punta Gorda, where it shares jurisdiction with the Punta Gorda Police Department. The office also operates the Charlotte County Jail.

== History ==
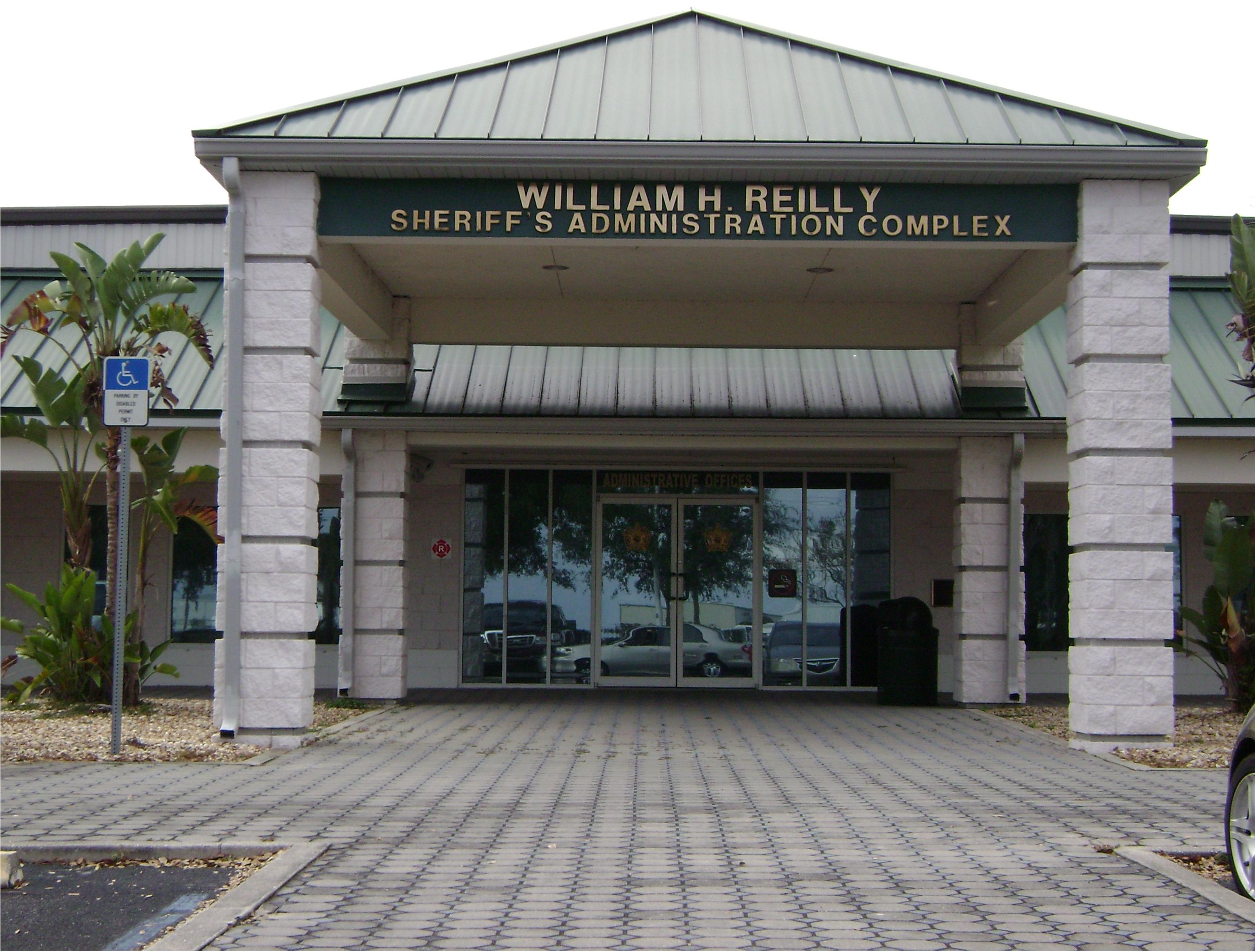
CCSO Headquarters

The Charlotte County Sheriff's Office was formed in 1921, when Florida Governor Cary A. Hardee appointed school teacher James H. Lipscomb as sheriff for the county; 16 men have served as Sheriff of Charlotte County to date. In its early days, much of its focus was on enforcing laws restricting the sale and use of alcohol under prohibition.

=== Charlotte County Jail ===
The current county jail is located at 26601 Airport Road in Punta Gorda, near the Punta Gorda Airport and the Charlotte campus of Florida SouthWestern State College. It was built in 2001 and has a capacity of 1,074. It is described by the sheriff's office as a "direct supervision jail," differing from conventional jails in that an officer is stationed within the housing unit. The sheriff's office and health provider Corizon Health have been criticized after numerous inmates have died in custody at the Charlotte County Jail and lawsuits were filed by the inmates' families.

== Jurisdiction ==
The Charlotte County Sheriff's Office has jurisdiction throughout Charlotte County, which is divided into five districts. District 1 covers the area west of the Myakka River, including Boca Grande, Englewood, the Gulf Cove area of Port Charlotte, Knights Island, Little Gasparilla Island, Placida, and Rotonda West. District 2 covers five zones in Murdock, El Jobean, and Port Charlotte. District 3 covers the eastern portions of Port Charlotte, Deep Creek, Harbor Heights, and Charlotte Harbor. District 4 covers four zones in Punta Gorda and Burnt Store. District 5 covers four zones in Punta Gorda and Babcock Ranch.

== Notable cases ==
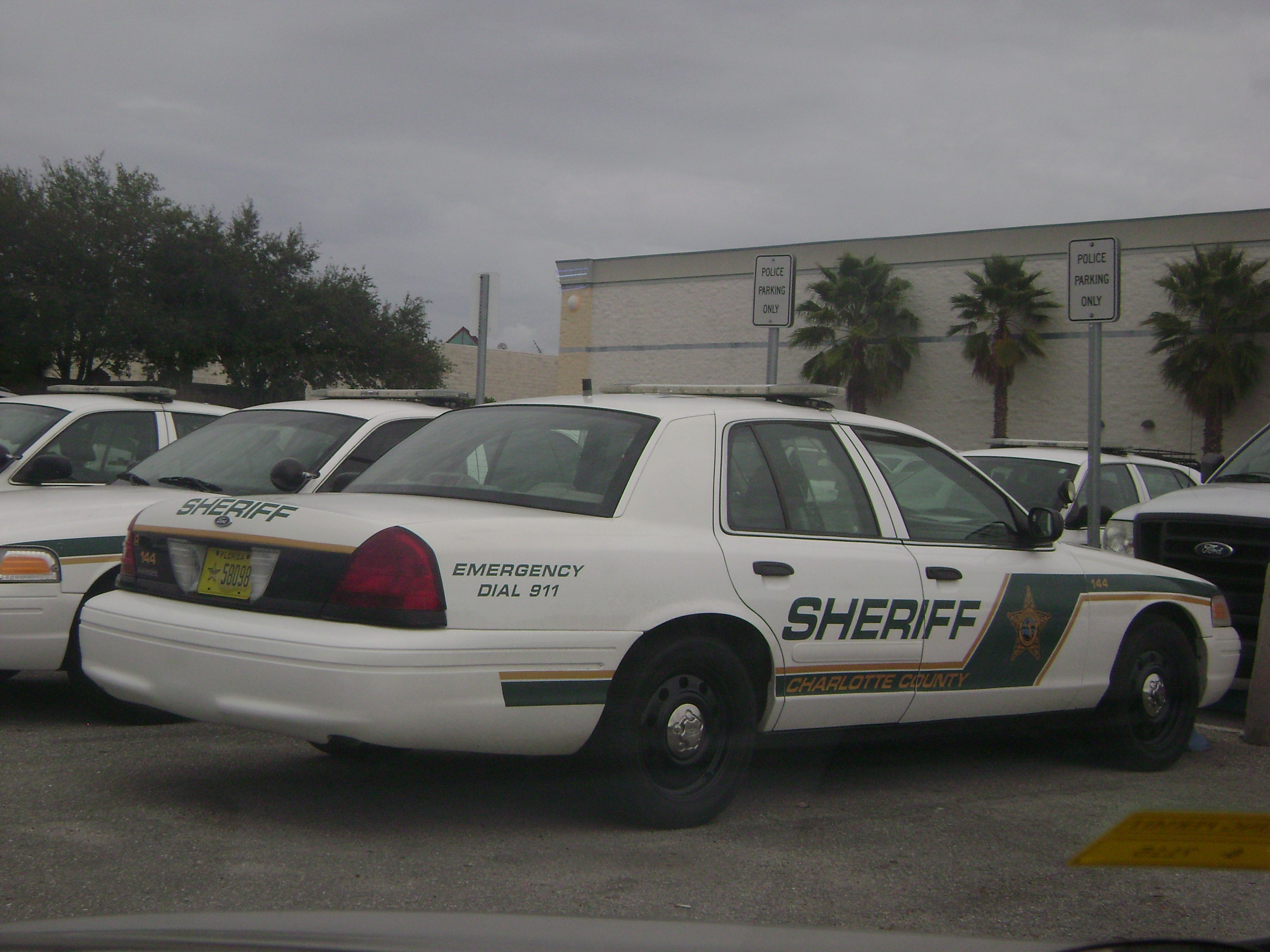
CCSO patrol car

=== Denise Amber Lee ===
On January 17, 2008, Denise Amber Lee, who was 21 years old at the time of her death, was kidnapped from her home in North Port and taken to Charlotte County where she was raped and murdered by an individual named Michael King. Numerous calls were placed to 9-1-1 emergency services in relation to the incident, some of which were routed to the Charlotte County Sheriff's Office. Notably, a 9-1-1 call was placed by Jane Kowalski, a woman from Tampa, who thought she was witnessing a child abduction while traveling on U.S. 41 in Port Charlotte. It has been argued that information provided by Kowalski could have saved Lee's life had the information been properly relayed to deputies in the field searching for Lee and her abductor. King was apprehended by the Florida Highway Patrol while turning onto Interstate 75 from Toledo Blade Blvd in North Port; Lee had been fatally shot in the head and her body buried in a shallow grave off of Plantation Blvd in North Port. This incident led to the passing of the Denise Amber Lee Act, which established additional training for 9-1-1 dispatchers in Florida.

== Fallen officers ==
The CCSO has lost four officers and one K-9 in the line of duty since 1983. The first officer to fall in the line of duty was Deputy Sheriff Curtis Moore, who was mortally wounded after a woman pulled out in front of him from a condo complex as he drove his police motorcycle in Placida on April 24.

Two officers and one K-9 were fatally shot by criminals while two officers have been killed in traffic crashes.

== Elected sheriffs ==
- J. H. Lipscomb (1921-1941)
- Arthur F. Quednau (1941-1957)
- Travis Parnell (1957-1965)
- Richard A. Stickley (1965-1966)
- John P. Shannon (1966)
- David Deegan (1966-1967)
- John P. 'Jack' Bent (1967-1977)
- Alan L. LeBeau (1977-1981)
- Glen E. Sapp (1981-1985)
- J.M. 'Buddy' Phillips (1985, 2003)
- John J. McDougall (1985-1986)
- Glen E. Sapp (1986-1989)
- Richard H. Worch Jr. (1989-2001)
- William E. Clement (2001-2003)
- J.M. 'Buddy' Phillips (2003)
- Bill Cameron (2003-2005, 2009-2012)
- John Davenport (2005-2009)
- Bill Prummell (2012-present)
