= Titusville Police Department =

Law enforcement agency in Titusville, Florida

City of Titusville Police Department
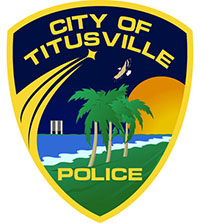
- Patch of the Titusville Police Department

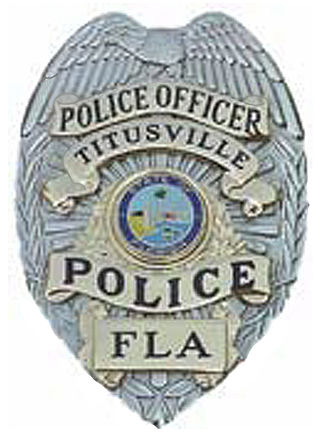
- Old badge for Titusville Police officers
- Common name: Titusville Police Department
- Abbreviation: TPD

Agency overview
- Employees: 154
- Annual budget: $11,597,418

Jurisdictional structure
- Operations jurisdiction: Titusville, Florida, US
- Map of City of Titusville Police Department's jurisdiction
- Area: 88.87 km^{2}
- Population: 48,789
- Legal jurisdiction: As per operations jurisdiction
- General nature: Local civilian police

Operational structure
- Headquarters: 1100 John Glenn Boulevard, Titusville, Florida
- Police Officers: ▲94 of 103 (2025)
- Civilians: ▲53 of 55 (2025)
- Agency executives: John R. Lau, Chief of Police; Todd Hutchinson, Deputy Chief; Matt Demmon, Commander
- Sections: List: Patrol Administration; ATV Unit; Special Services Section; Traffic Unit; K-9 Teams; School Resource Officers; Special Operations Unit; Criminal Investigations Section; Special Investigations Section; Crime Scene Investigations; Crisis Negotiation Team; Crime Suppression Unit; Reserve Officer Program; Community Watch Program
- Zones: List: Zone 1 (North Sector); Zone 2 (North Sector); Zone 3 (South Sector); Zone 4 (South Sector)

Facilities
- Stations: 1

Website
- http://www.titusville.com/SectionIndex.asp?SectionID=7

The Titusville Police Department (TPD) is the police force with the primary responsibility of public safety and the enforcement of state laws and county/municipal ordinances in the city of Titusville, Florida. In 2018, the department consisted of 137 full-time personnel and 17 part-time personnel. Full-time personnel includes sworn members, 911 dispatchers, code enforcement, and non-sworn civilians. The department also contained part-time personnel, like school crossing guards or record clerks.

== Organization ==
The Titusville Police Department, headed by the Chief of Police, is organized into six divisions: the Patrol Division, the Investigations Division, the Professional Standards Division, the Administrative Division, the Support Services Division, and the Tactical Operations Division. The Patrol Division and the Investigations Division together make up the Operations Bureau, which is headed by the Assistant Chief, while one major supervises each division.

== Vehicles ==
In 2018, TPD had a total fleet of 125 vehicles, including marked and unmarked patrol cars (most of which are Chevrolet Caprice and Chevrolet Impala), undercover vehicles, sport utility vehicles, Community Service Officer vehicles, ATVs, golf carts, two crime scene vans, a SWAT truck, and many other vehicles necessary for responding to the multitude of different calls for service it receives. Titusville also has confiscated vehicles that are used for investigations as well as senior staff cars.

A 1949 Ford police car was also refurbished and used by the department, in events like car shows and parades.

The current fleet of the Titusville Police Department is composed of 2013 Chevy Caprices, a number of Impalas, and a couple of Ford Crown Victorias. The department changed its marking scheme in October 2010 to a more up to date look. The current markings were picked from several designs. In 2013, the department decided to change the look of the new marked vehicles. The new fleet of marked Chevy Caprices sport a classic black and white color scheme. Older patrol cars are still dressed in white with blue markings. The department's Traffic Unit cars are all unmarked.

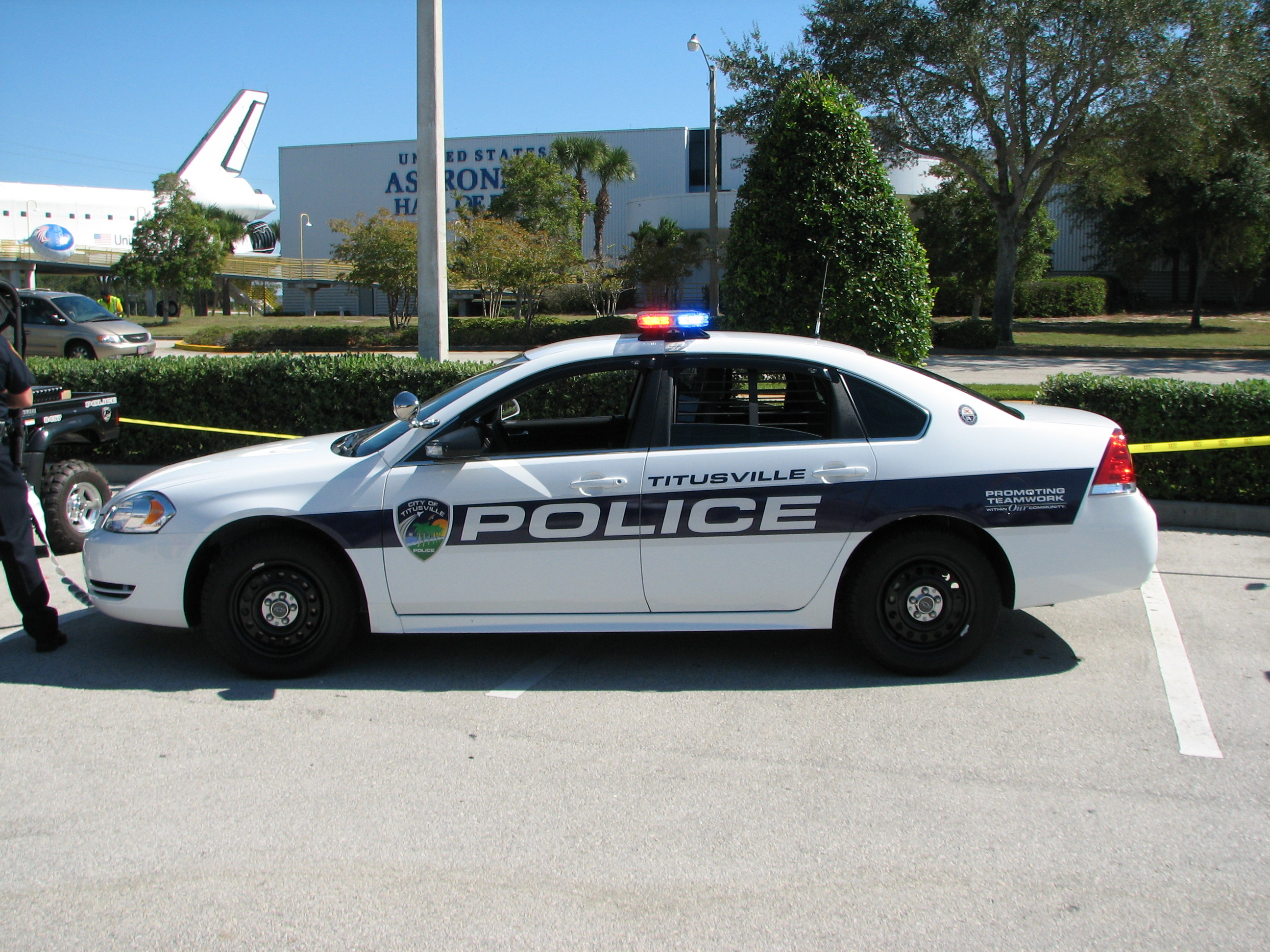
Police Impala in current markings

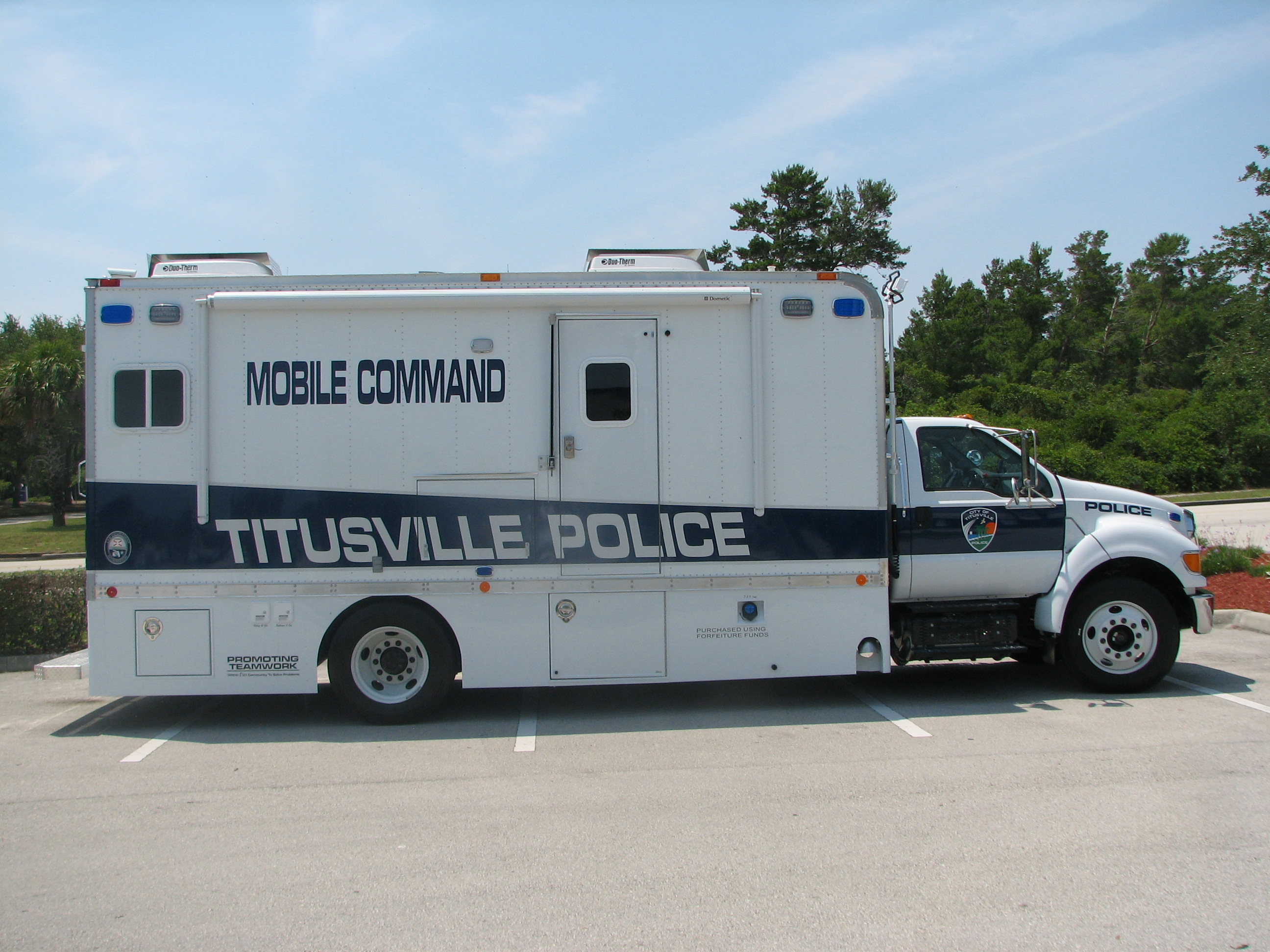
Mobile Command unit

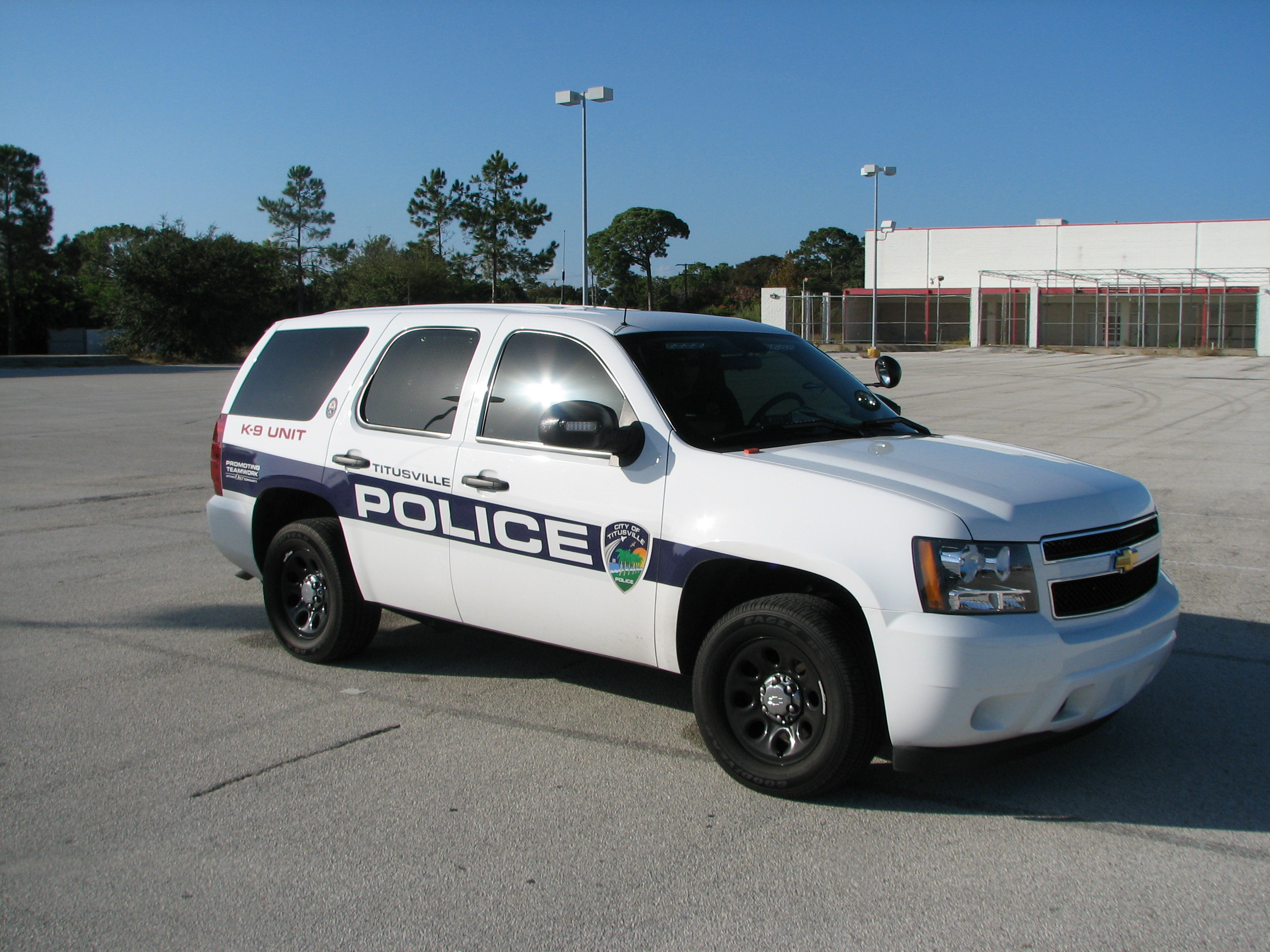
K9 Unit

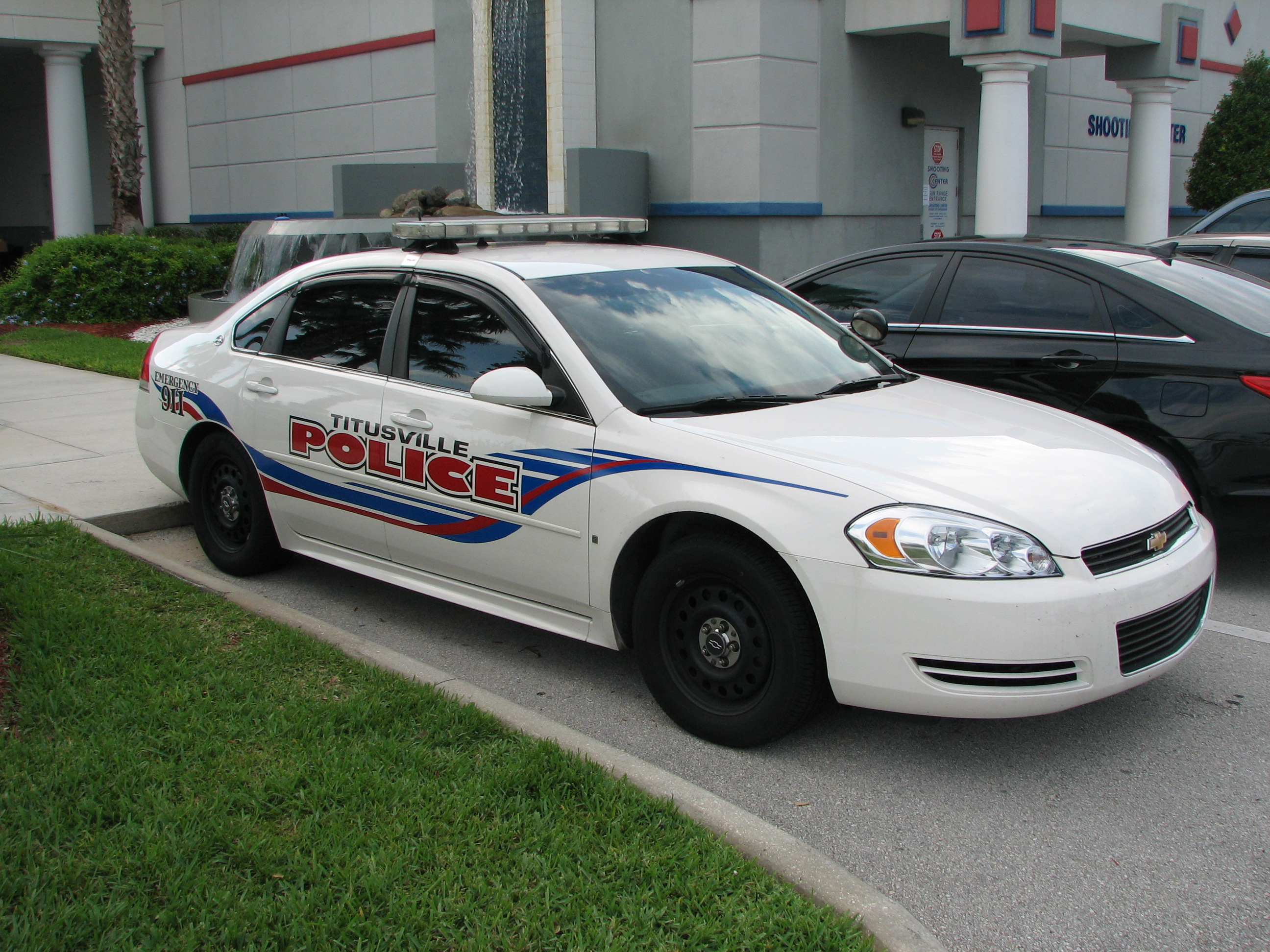
Police Impala sporting the old markings

== Community Watch ==
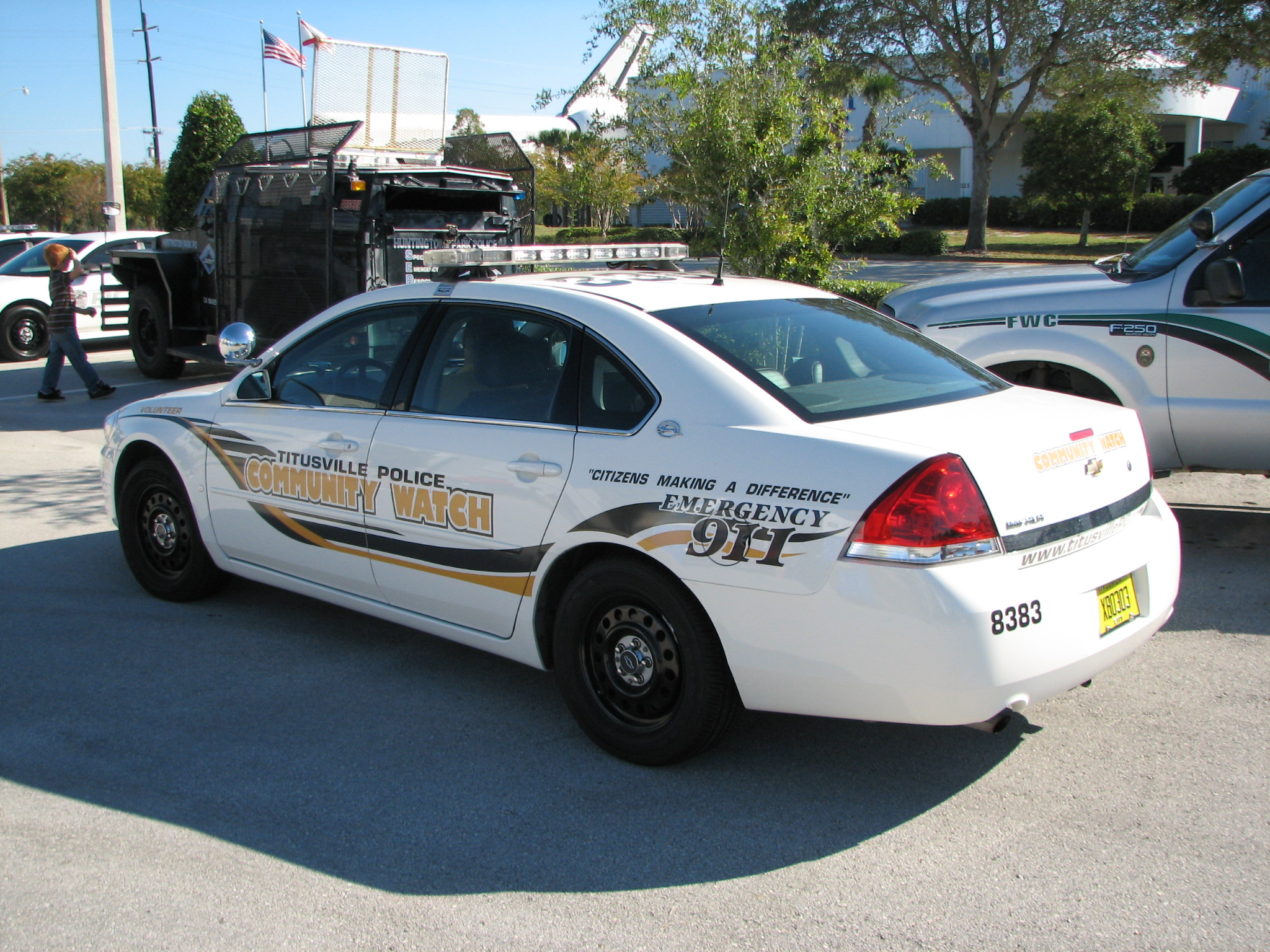
Community Watch Citizen Unit

Established in 1993, Titusville Police Department initiated a program for citizens to help be the eyes and ears of the department. The program puts citizens through a class after which they are allowed to patrol the streets and residential neighborhoods as well as business parking lots looking for any signs of suspicious and unusual activities. Along with the visible presence they provide areas, they provide valuable assistance to the officers on the street. At no time do Community Watch members become involved in arrests or violent situations. They handle only non-confrontational duties and report activity to police dispatchers via two-way radio. Community Watch members wear a marked, gold "Polo" shirt and black pants, and do not carry weapons nor a firearm.

Community Watch Volunteers can be seen helping direct traffic during launches from the nearby Kennedy Space Center, as well as helping during the Downtown Titusville Drive-In events held on Friday nights. Community Watch volunteers also support the TPD during the annual Christmas Parade, missing person searches, and at crime scenes.

== Newsletter ==
TPD has a newsletter, called the TPD Shield, which it uses to communicate with the community as a crime prevention tool. This awareness-raising publication is paid for by forfeiture funds at no cost to the taxpayer.

== Fallen officers ==
Two officers have been killed in the line of duty. The first officer killed was 35-year-old Police Officer Jack Schnell, who was struck by a drunk driver on his police motorcycle as Schnell was working a DUI patrol on December 31, 1982. The second was 36-year-old Police Officer Stephen House, who was part of a narcotics search warrant at the home of a suspected drug dealer on February 15, 1989. The suspected drug dealer's father barricaded himself inside his bedroom and House led an entry team into the bedroom using a stun grenade. House was shot through the bedroom door and struck in the left shoulder, which was not protected by his protective vest, and the bullet entered his chest cavity, ultimately killing him.
