= Traffic homicide investigator =

A traffic homicide investigator (THI) is a term used primarily in the United States of America for a police employee, generally a sworn law enforcement officer, who is assigned to investigate fatalities resulting from motor vehicle collisions.

== Overview ==
Traffic homicide investigators have special training that goes beyond standard accident investigation and equips them to conduct an investigation of the site of serious or fatal collisions and to treat them as crime scenes. They are usually traffic officers who have investigated a great number of nonfatal crashes and have advanced towards more in-depth crash investigation. Although they may not be the first responders to traffic-related fatalities, they will be called upon to take over the investigations at an early stage and see them through to their conclusions.

== Method ==
THIs are "part physicist, part policeman and part victim's advocate". They carefully document the scenes of crashes, ideally in a manner thorough enough to allow specially trained officers to reconstruct the scene at a later time, after the roadway has been reopened. This includes documenting the precise details of the roadway on which the fatality occurred; the state of any vehicles involved, including the use of safety features; the condition, legal status and attitude of the operator or operators of any vehicles, and any other local factors such as the weather and the presence or absence of appropriate road signage.

In addition, investigators will conduct interviews with drivers and witnesses to assist in building up an overall picture of what led to the crash.

== Around the world ==
=== United Kingdom ===
In the United Kingdom, specialised collision investigators from the local police force's Serious Collision Investigation Unit, a sub-unit of the Roads Policing Unit, will investigate collisions that result in death, serious injury or attract significant media attention. They receive extensive training equivalent to US counterparts and conduct their investigations with similar methodology.

== See also ==
- Vehicular homicide
- Manslaughter
- Detective
