= Osceola County Sheriff's Office =

Law enforcement agency in Florida, U.S.

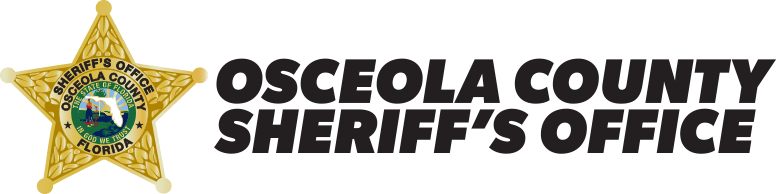
- Abbreviation: OCSO

Jurisdictional structure
- Operations jurisdiction: Osceola County, Florida, USA
- Map of Osceola County Sheriff's Office's jurisdiction
- Area: 1,506.35 sq mi (3,901.4 km^{2})
- Population: 268,685
- General nature: Local civilian police

Operational structure
- Headquarters: Kissimmee, Florida
- Sworn members: 500+
- Agency executives: Christopher Blackmon, Sherriff; Lee Massie, Undersheriff; Alex Guevara, Major over Patrol Bureau; Dan Weis, Major over the Administration Bureau; Fred Hinderman, Major over CID Bureau; Kevin Brown, Major over Special Operations

Website
- Osceola County Sheriff's Office

The Osceola County Sheriff's Office (OSCO) is the primary law enforcement agency serving Osceola County, Florida, and is headquartered in Kissimmee. Under the Florida Constitution, the Sheriff is designated as the chief law enforcement officer for both incorporated and unincorporated areas of the county. The current Sheriff, Christopher (Chris) A. Blackmon, was appointed by Governor Ron DeSantis following the suspension of former Sheriff Marcos R. Lopez, who was the county's 20th sheriff and the first Hispanic to hold the position. The agency employs over 700 personnel and serves a population of approximately 390,341 residents. Osceola County deputies patrol an area of 1,506 square miles (3,900 km²), which includes the cities of Kissimmee, St. Cloud, Celebration, Poinciana, and several other unincorporated communities.

== History ==
The Osceola County Sheriff's Office, headquartered in Kissimmee, Florida, serves as the primary law enforcement agency for Osceola County. Established in 1887, it has grown into a modern agency with over 700 personnel, covering a jurisdiction of 1,506 square miles and serving more than 390,000 residents.

=== Founding and early years (1887–1920s) ===
Osceola County was formed in 1887 from portions of Orange and Brevard counties. On August 6, 1887, Thomas Alexander Bass was elected as the county's first sheriff. During this period, a Romanesque-style courthouse and jail were constructed in Kissimmee, laying the foundation for organized law enforcement in the region.

=== Mid-20th century growth and specialization ===
In 1971, under Sheriff K.O. Murphy, the agency launched its Motorcycle Unit, beginning with two Harley-Davidson Electra Glide motorcycles. This unit eventually evolved into a full-time team involved in traffic enforcement, funeral escorts, and community safety education programs.

=== Accreditation and professionalization (1999–present) ===
In 1999, the Osceola County Sheriff's Office achieved accreditation through the Commission for Florida Law Enforcement Accreditation (CFA), meeting rigorous state standards across more than 200 professional criteria. The agency has since maintained this accredited status through regular reassessments.

Throughout the 2000s and 2010s, OCSO expanded its community outreach programs, technological infrastructure, and data-driven policing methods. These included the introduction of body-worn cameras, enhanced reporting systems, and public transparency initiatives.

=== Leadership changes ===
The 20th sheriff of Osceola County, Marcos R. Lopez, elected in 2020, was the first Hispanic to serve in the position. In 2025, Lopez was suspended and subsequently arrested on charges of racketeering and conspiracy related to an illegal gambling operation. Following his suspension, Governor Ron DeSantis appointed Chris A. Blackmon as the interim sheriff.

=== Community engagement ===
The Osceola County Sheriff Foundation, a 501(c)(3) nonprofit, was established to support the Sheriff's Office through community partnerships, fundraising efforts, and assistance to deputies and their families.

== Controversies ==
The Osceola County Sheriff’s Office (OCSO) has faced a number of controversies in recent years involving both sworn officers and civilian staff:

- In 2021, a deputy was recorded in a viral video forcefully slamming a high school student to the ground during a campus altercation, drawing public outrage and sparking an internal review.
- In 2022, an OCSO deputy deployed a Taser near a gas pump during a confrontation, causing a fire that severely injured a suspect. The deputy was later criminally charged. In a separate incident that same year, deputies shot and killed a man suspected of shoplifting in a Target parking lot, prompting an investigation by the Florida Department of Law Enforcement (FDLE).
- In March 2024, Sheriff Marcos R. Lopez came under fire after posting a graphic photo of 13-year-old murder victim Madeline Soto on the sheriff's personal Instagram account, embedded within a community event post. The image prompted widespread criticism and national and international media coverage. Lopez later apologized and pleaded no contest to a public records violation, resulting in a $250 fine. In January 2025, he was placed on the Brady List by the Ninth Judicial Circuit State Attorney for allegedly giving conflicting public statements and sworn testimony regarding the incident, potentially undermining his credibility in criminal prosecutions.
- Also in 2024, public concerns arose regarding Nirva Rodriguez, a civilian staff member and media spokesperson for the Osceola County Sheriff’s Office, who continued to represent the agency in official communications and video productions despite lacking formal law enforcement training. Critics questioned her involvement in sensitive operations and her frequent appearance in uniform-like attire in official videos, which blurred the lines between sworn authority and civilian roles. The agency defended her position by highlighting her responsibilities in community outreach and bilingual engagement, though transparency advocates raised concerns about accountability. Later that year, Rodriguez faced significant public criticism after posting a selfie-style photo on her personal social media account taken outside the Osceola County Corrections facility in Kissimmee. The photo included Rodriguez alongside the accused killer of 13-year-old Madeline Soto, who was in custody during an ongoing homicide investigation. The informal nature of the image and Rodriguez's proximity to the suspect, given the sensitive context, were widely deemed inappropriate and unprofessional. Critics argued the photo further blurred the distinction between public relations and law enforcement duties, calling into question the agency’s judgment and messaging. Although no formal disciplinary action was publicly disclosed at the time, Rodriguez later deleted the post. Following the arrest and suspension of former Sheriff Marcos R. Lopez in 2025, Rodriguez was subsequently fired from the agency. The incident intensified scrutiny of the role and conduct of non-sworn personnel like Rodriguez, particularly regarding their representation of the agency in uniform-style attire in official communications.
- In June 2025, Lopez was arrested on charges of racketeering and conspiracy in connection to a large-scale illegal gambling operation. Prosecutors allege that he received campaign contributions and personal payments in exchange for shielding the operation from law enforcement scrutiny. Governor Ron DeSantis suspended him from office and appointed Christopher (Chris) A. Blackmon as interim sheriff.

== Divisions ==
Enforcement Bureau

- Uniform Patrol
- Aviation Unit
- Mounted Patrol Unit
- HIDTA Task Force
- IRS Task Force
- FBI-JTTF

Criminal Investigations Division

- East Property Crimes
- West Property Crimes
- Economic Crimes
- Persons Crimes
- Sex Crimes/Child Abuse
- Crime Analysis/Intelligence
- Robbery
- Violent Crimes
- Evidence Unit
- Forensics

Specialty units

- SWAT
- Emergency Response Team
- Agriculture/Marine
- Community Response Team
- K-9 Unit
- Tourism Policing Unit
- Traffic/DUI Unit
- Gang Unit
- N.E.T.
- O.C.I.B.

Administrative Bureau

- Civilian Volunteers
- Civil Process
- Communications
- Community Services
- Court Services
- Crime Prevention
- Fleet Maintenance
- Records
- Information Management
- Quality Assurance and Accreditation
- Research and Development
- School Resource
- Training
- Warrants
- K9-Unit
