= Tampa City Council =

Municipal government of Tampa, Florida

Type
- Type: Unicameral legislature of the Municipal Government

Leadership
- Chair: Alan R. Clendenin since May 2025
- Chair Pro-Tempore: Lynn Hurtak since May 2025

Structure
- Seats: 7 total, representing: Alan Clendenin, District 1. (At-large); Charlie Miranda, District 2. (at-large); Lynn Hurtak, District 3. (at-large); Bill Carlson, District 4. (South); Naya Young, District 5. (East); Guido Maniscalco, District 6. (West); Robin Lockett, District 7. (North)
- Political groups: Democratic (7)

Elections
- Last election: March (primary) / April (runoff), 2019: to a 4-year term (May 1, 2019 - April 30, 2023)

Meeting place
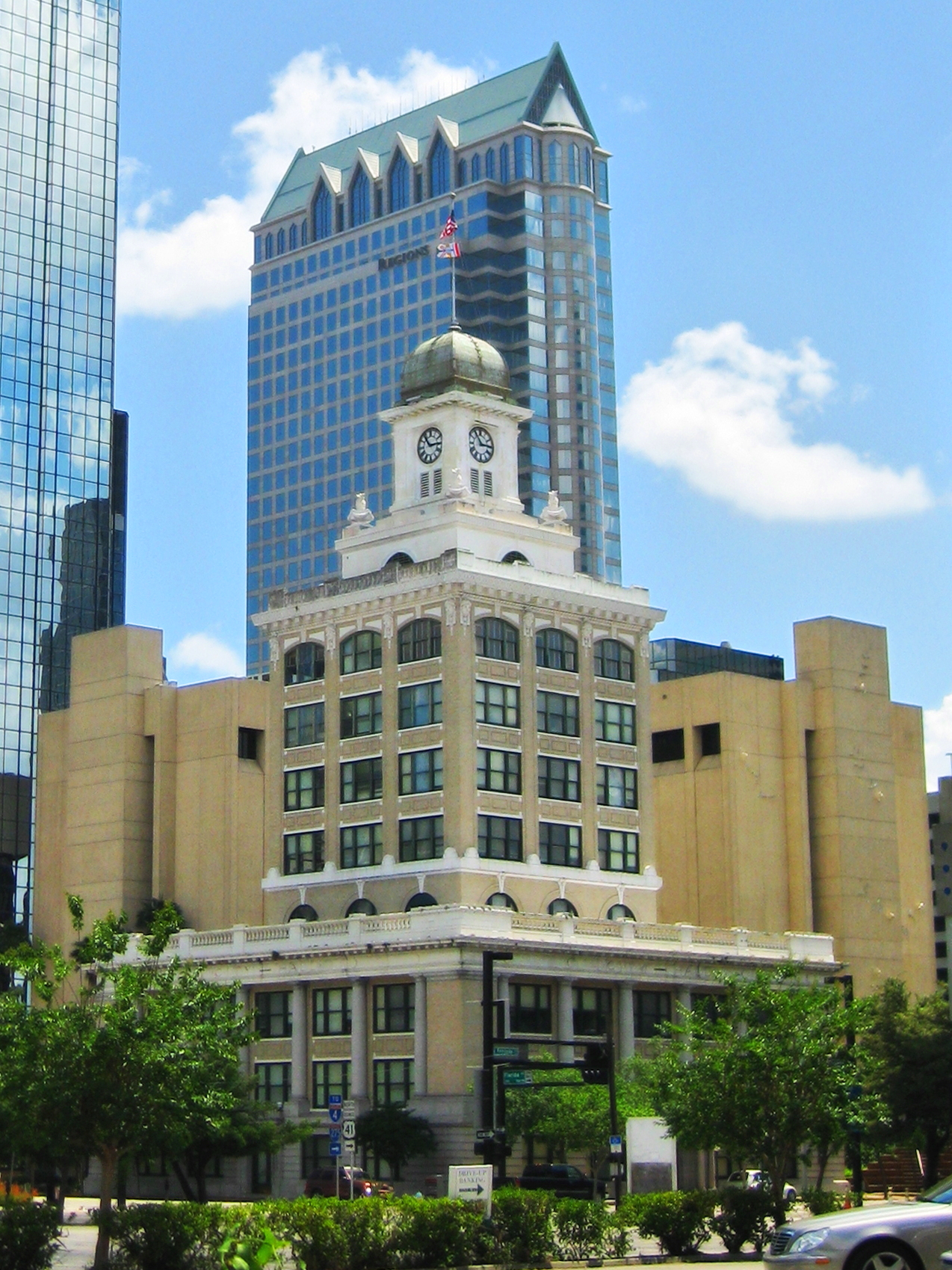

- Old City Hall; Council Chambers, Third floor 315 E. Kennedy Blvd. Tampa, Florida 33602^{City Flag of Tampa}

Website
- TampaGov.net

Footnotes
- Operates in accordance with provisions of the 1974 Revised Charter of the City of Tampa. The City of Tampa Charter was revised during the 2019 municipal elections via amendments, which will govern the newly elected Council.

The Tampa City Council is the legislative body of the municipal government of the U.S. city of Tampa, in Hillsborough County, Florida. The City Council consists of seven members, each representing one of seven corresponding districts from which they were elected. City Council, as the city's legislative branch, is responsible for enacting ordinances and resolutions administered by the corresponding executive branch, the Mayor of Tampa.

City Council seats for all districts are decided concurrently in elections held every four years during the month of March. During election years, the term of office for the Council's outgoing body expires on April 30, while the Council's newly elected body officially begin their term on May 1. The four-year terms are scheduled to expire/commence during odd-numbered years, with the term of office for the Council's current membership scheduled to draw to an end on April 30, 2023.

== Districts ==
Districts 1, 2, and 3 are all at-large districts, serving a constituency of Tampa's total electorate. To form the remaining Districts 4 through 7, the city limits were sectioned into four separate, respective districts, each containing its own unique resident constituency of local voters.

=== District 4 (South) ===
Neighborhoods represented under District Four include Ballast Point, Bayshore Beautiful, Bayshore Gardens, Bayside West, Bel Mar Shores, Gandy-Sun Bay South, Golfview, Historic Hyde Park, New Suburb Beautiful, Palma Ceia, Parkland Estates, Port Tampa City, and Virginia Park.

District 4 also includes portions of Hyde Park North, Sunset Park and Courier City-Oscawana.

This district includes all of the Davis Islands, Harbor Island, and Picnic Island. It also is home to the SoHo Entertainment District.

=== District 5 (East) ===
Neighborhoods which comprise District 5 include College Hill, East Tampa, East Ybor, Florence Villa-Beasley-Oak Park, Grant Park, Live Oaks Square, Highland Pines, Historic Ybor, Northeast Community, Northview Hills, Old West Tampa, Palmetto Beach, Ridgewood Park, Rivergrove, V.M. Ybor, West Riverfront, Woodland Terrace, and most of residential Sulphur Springs.

District 5 includes partial sections of Courier City-Oscawana, Historic Hyde Park North, North Hyde Park, Old Seminole Heights, Southeast Seminole Heights, and Tampa Heights.

This district includes the areas of Downtown Tampa, the historical area of Gary, the Channel District, the Port of Tampa, and the Uceta Rail Yard.

=== District 6 (West) ===
Neighborhoods within District 6 include Armenia Gardens Estates, Beach Park, Beach Park Isles, Bon Air, Carver City/Lincoln Gardens, Culbreath Heights, Drew Park, Gray Gables, Macfarlane Park-Northeast Macfarlane-West Tampa, West Tampa Heights, Marina Club, North Bon Air, Oakford Park, Palma Ceia West, Parkview, Plaza Terrace, Riverbend, Riverside Heights, South Seminole Heights, Swann Estates, Wellswood, and Westshore Palms.

District 6 includes partial sections of Courier City-Oscawana, Lowry Park, North Hyde Park, Old Seminole Heights, Southeast Seminole Heights, Sunset Park and Tampa Heights.

Prominent locations within this district include the Westshore Business District, George M. Steinbrenner Field, Tampa International Airport and Raymond James Stadium.

=== District 7 (North) ===
Neighborhoods making up District 7 include Forest Hills, Temple Crest, Terrace Park, and University Square, as well as the region of New Tampa, which includes Cory Lake Isles, Hunters Green, Tampa Palms, and West Meadows.

District 7 contains a section of Lowry Park, specifically, the neighborhood's North section.

Prominent locations within this district include Busch Gardens, the Museum of Science & Industry (MOSI), and the University of South Florida.

== Members ==
As of April 2026, the current makeup of the Tampa City Council is as follows:

- District 1 (at-large): Alan Clendenin (D)
- District 2 (at-large): Guido Maniscalco (D)
- District 3 (at-large): Lynn Hurtak (D)
- District 4 (South): Bill Carlson (D)
- District 5 (East): Naya Young (D)
- District 6 (West): Charlie Miranda (D)
- District 7 (North): Robin Lockett (D)
