= North Tampa =

Region of the capital of Florida

Coordinates: 28.0502778°N 82.45°W

North Tampa, 2013

North Tampa is a region that comprises the city of Tampa communities of Forest Hills, Harvey Heights, North Tampa (neighborhood), Tampa Overlook, Temple Crest, Terrace Park and University Square, and the areas in New Tampa. The region represents District 7 of Tampa City Council. North Tampa also comprises communities in unincorporated Hillsborough County such as Avila, Northdale, Carrollwood, University, Lutz and Lake Magdalene.

North Tampa contains a section of Lowry Park, specifically, the neighborhood's North section.

Prominent locations within this region include Busch Gardens, the Museum of Science & Industry (MOSI), and the University of South Florida.
