= Audubon Park (Tampa) =

- Neighborhood
- Location within the state of Florida
- Coordinates: 27°55′34″N 82°25′30″W
- Country: United States
- State: Florida
- County: Hillsborough
- City: Tampa

Population (2000)
  - Total: 19
- Time zone: UTC-5 (Eastern (EST))
  - Summer (DST): UTC-4 (EDT)
- ZIP codes: 33609
- Area code: 813

Audubon Park is a neighborhood within the district of South Tampa, which represents District 4 of the Tampa City Council. As of the 2000 census, the neighborhood recorded a population of 19. The ZIP Code serving the neighborhood is 33609.

== Geography ==
Audubon Park is located at latitude 27.926 north and longitude 82.524 west; or 4 miles (6 km) WSW of Downtown Tampa. The elevation is 3 feet (1 m) above sea level. Its boundaries are roughly Stoney Point to the west, Palma Ceia West to the east and Sunset Park area to the south. The neighborhood has an area of 0.002 square miles (5,000 m^{2}) and the population density of 11,438 people per square mile.

== Education ==
The community of Audubon Park is served by Hillsborough County Schools.

== See also ==
- South Tampa
