= West Hyde Park =

Hyde Park Spanishtown Creek
- Neighborhood
- Location within the state of Florida
- Coordinates: 27°56′2″N 82°28′26″W
- Country: United States
- State: Florida
- County: Hillsborough
- City: Tampa
- Elevation: 3 ft (0.91 m)
- Time zone: UTC-5 (Eastern (EST))
  - Summer (DST): UTC-4 (EDT)
- ZIP codes: 33606
- Area code: 813
- GNIS feature ID: 2484667

Hyde Park Spanishtown Creek, formally West Hyde Park, is a neighborhood within the district of Hyde Park, which represents District 4 of the Tampa City Council. The 2000 census numbers were unavailable, however, the latest estimated population was 1,534 and the population density was 6,356 people per square mile.

== Geography ==
Hyde Park Spanishtown Creek boundaries are roughly Courier City to the west, Hyde Park North to the north, Palma Ceia to the southwest and Morrison Grove to the east. The ZIP Code serving the neighborhood is 33606. The community is located at 27.934 degrees north, 82.474 degrees west. The elevation for the community is three feet above sea level.

== Demographics ==
Source: West Hyde Park neighborhood detailed profile

The latest estimated population was 1,534, which consists of 781 males and 753 females. The median age is 34.7 for males and 35.7 for females. The percentage of marriage couple stands at 31.8%.

The median income for the neighborhood is $98,370. The average family size is 2.7 and the average household size is approximately 1.8 persons.

== Education ==
Hyde Park Spanishtown Creek is served by Hillsborough County Public Schools, which serves the city of Tampa and Hillsborough County.
