= Culbreath Isles =

- Neighborhood
- Location within the state of Florida
- Coordinates: 27°55′54″N 82°31′50″W
- Country: United States
- State: Florida
- County: Hillsborough
- City: Tampa

Population (2010)
  - Total: 574
- Time zone: UTC-5 (Eastern (EST))
  - Summer (DST): UTC-4 (EDT)
- ZIP codes: 33609 and 33629

Culbreath Isles is a neighborhood within the South Tampa district of Tampa. As of the 2010 census the neighborhood had a population of 574. The ZIP Codes serving the area are 33609 and 33629. Colonel Harry C. Culbreath of South Carolina and his family first homesteaded this region in the late 1860s cultivating oranges and raising cattle.

== Geography ==
Culbreath Isles boundaries are Beach Park to the north, Tampa Bay to the west and south, and Westshore Blvd. to the east.

== Demographics ==
Source: Hillsborough County Atlas

At the 2010 census there were 574 people and 197 households residing in the neighborhood. The population density was 4,171/mi^{2}. The racial makeup of the neighborhood was 98% White, 1% African American, less than 1% Native American, less than 1% Asian, 0% from other races, and 1% from two or more races. Hispanic or Latino of any race were about 11%.

Of the 197 households 39% had children under the age of 18 living with them, 79% were married couples living together, 5% had a female householder with no husband present, and 3% were non-families. 23% of households were made up of individuals.

The age distribution was 30% under the age of 18, 7% from 18 to 34, 20% from 35 to 49, 26% from 50 to 64, and 19% 65 or older. For every 100 females, there were 105.4 males.

The per capita income for the neighborhood was $75,612. About 1% of the population were below the poverty line. Of those, 5% are under age 18.

== See also ==
- Neighborhoods in Tampa, Florida
