= South Tampa =

- Region
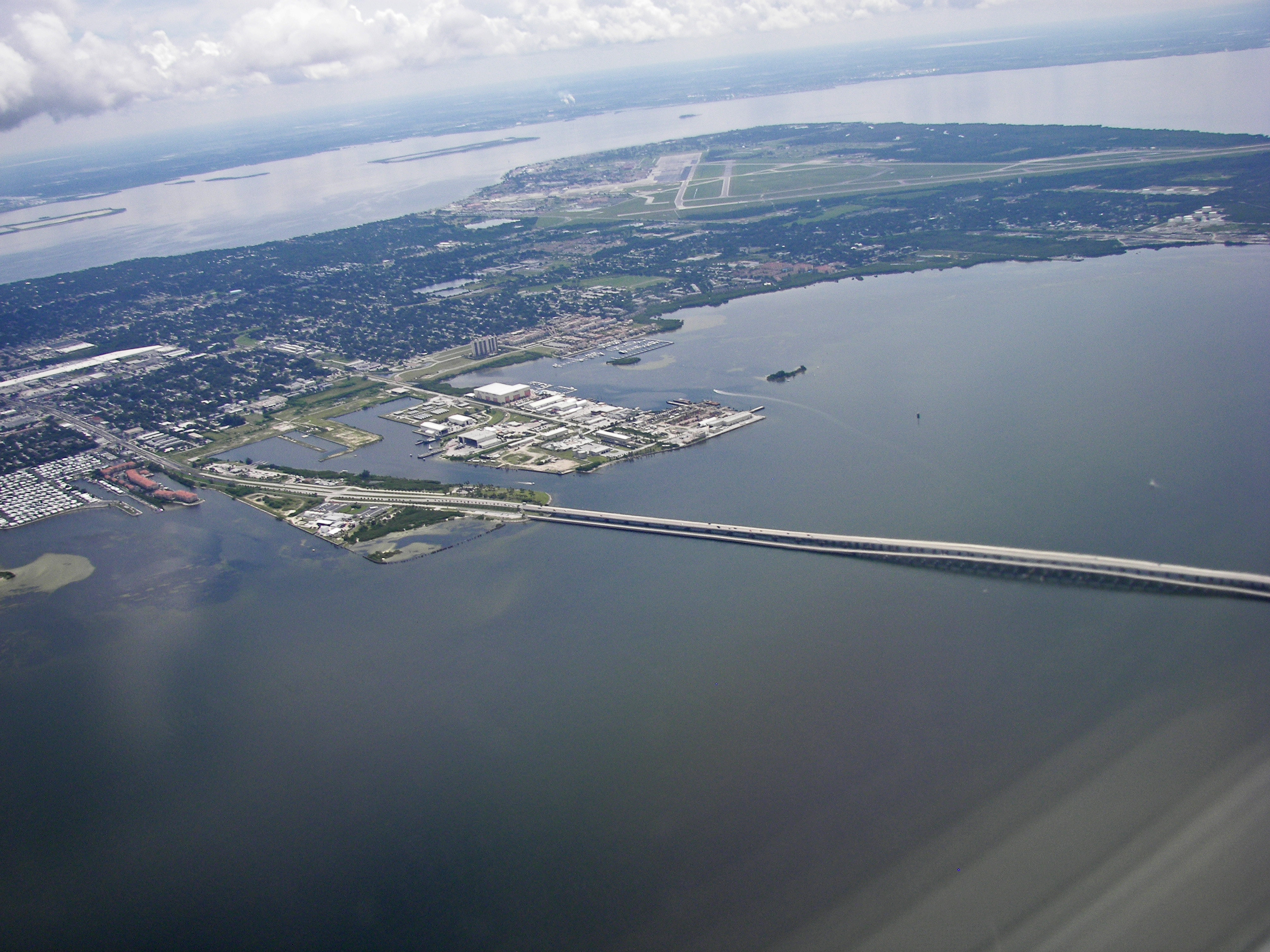
- Southernmost portion including MacDill Air Force Base and the Gandy Bridge

- Location within the state of Florida
- Coordinates: 27°53'N 82°30'W 27°51′19″N 82°30′35″W
- Country: United States
- State: Florida
- County: Hillsborough
- City: Tampa
- Time zone: UTC-5 (Eastern (EST))
  - Summer (DST): UTC-4 (EDT)
- ZIP codes: 33608, 33609, 33611,33616, 33621, and 33629
- Area code: 813

South Tampa is a region in the city of Tampa that includes the neighborhoods of Beach Park, Ballast Point, Bayshore Beautiful, Bayshore Gardens, Bayside West, Belmar Shore, Davis Islands, Port Tampa, Fair Oaks-Manhattan Manor, Golfview, Hyde Park, New Suburb Beautiful, Virginia Park, Palma Ceia, Rattlesnake Gandy-Sun Bay South, South Westshore, parts of Sunset Park and Courier City-Oscawana. MacDill Air Force Base is also included. The region represents District 4 of the Tampa City Council. The ZIP Codes serving the area are 33606, 33608, 33609, 33611, 33616, 33621, and 33629

== Description ==
South Tampa is a region of several neighborhoods in Tampa, Florida and is located on the Interbay Peninsula. It is surrounded by Tampa Bay on the west, Hillsborough Bay on the east and West Tampa on the north. Its main roadways include Dale Mabry Highway, U.S. Route 92 (Gandy Boulevard), West Shore Boulevard, Bayshore Boulevard, Bay to Bay Boulevard, and the Lee Roy Selmon Expressway.

The region of South Tampa is the area between Kennedy Blvd to the north and MacDill Air Force Base in Tampa, Florida to the south.
