= Maryland Manor =

- Neighborhood
- Location within the state of Florida
- Coordinates: 27°55′3″N 82°30′51″W
- Country: United States
- State: Florida
- County: Hillsborough
- City: Tampa
- Elevation: 10 ft (3.0 m)
- Time zone: UTC-5 (Eastern (EST))
  - Summer (DST): UTC-4 (EDT)
- ZIP codes: 33629

Maryland Manor is a neighborhood in the southern area of Tampa, Florida, which represents District 4 of the Tampa City Council. The 2000 census numbers were unavailable, however, the latest estimated population was 1,616.

== Geography ==
Maryland Manor is located at 27.91749 and -82.51429. The elevation is 10 feet above sea level.

Maryland Manor boundaries are roughly Manhattan Avenue to the west, Santiago Street/Palmira Avenue to the north, Vasconia Street to the south and Lois Avenue/Grady Avenue to the east. The ZIP Code serving the neighborhood is 33629. The land area of the neighborhood is 0.33 square miles (850,000 m^{2}) and the population density was 4,860 persons per square mile.

== Demographics ==
Source: Maryland Manor: city-data.com

The latest estimated population was 1,616, which consists of 790 males and 826 females. The median age is 33.2 for males and 36.2 for females. The percentage of marriage couple stands at 50.9%.

The median income for the neighborhood is $89,564. The average family size is 2.9 and the average household size is approximately 2.3 persons.

== Education ==
Maryland Manor is served by Hillsborough County Public Schools, which serves the city of Tampa and Hillsborough County.
