= Dixie Farms =

- Neighborhood
- Location within the state of Florida
- Coordinates: 27°57′43″N 82°23′35″W
- Country: United States
- State: Florida
- County: Hillsborough
- City: Tampa
- Elevation: 20 ft (6.1 m)
- Time zone: UTC-5 (Eastern (EST))
  - Summer (DST): UTC-4 (EDT)
- ZIP codes: 33619

Dixie Farms is a neighborhood near the district of Uceta Yard, which represents District 5 of the Tampa City Council. The 2000 census numbers were unavailable, however, the latest estimated population was 34 and the population density was 249 people per square mile.

== Geography ==
Dixie Farms boundaries are roughly 52nd Street to the west, Broadway to the north, and Uceta Yard to the south and east. The ZIP Code serving the neighborhood is 33619.

== Education ==
Dixie Farms is served by Hillsborough County Public Schools, which serves the city of Tampa and Hillsborough County.
