= Macfarlane Park, Tampa =

Macfarlane Park
- Neighborhood
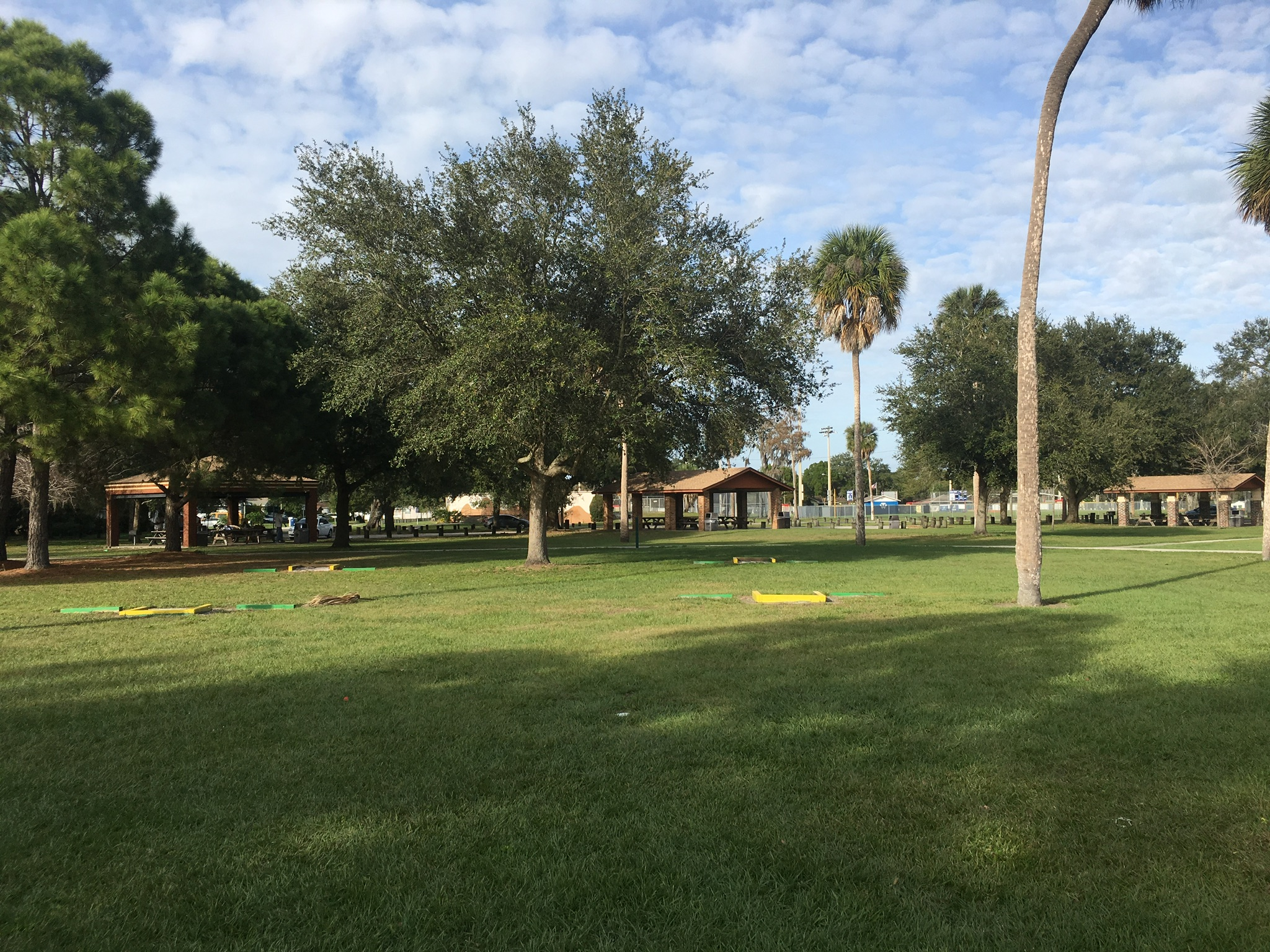
- Macfarlane Park, the park within the neighborhood, January 2020

- Location within the state of Florida
- Coordinates: 27°57′31″N 82°29′43″W
- Country: United States
- State: Florida
- County: Hillsborough
- City: Tampa
- Elevation: 36 ft (11 m)
- Time zone: UTC-5 (Eastern (EST))
  - Summer (DST): UTC-4 (EDT)
- ZIP codes: 33607

Macfarlane Park is a neighborhood in the West Tampa district of Tampa, Florida, which represents District 6 of the Tampa City Council. The 2000 census numbers were unavailable; however, the latest estimated population was 1,754.

== Geography ==
MacFarlane Park is located at 27.958632 and -82.495373. The elevation is 30 feet (9.1 m) above sea level.

Macfarlane Park boundaries are roughly Himes Avenue to the west, Beach Street to the north, Cypress Street/Main Street to the south and Mac Dill Avenue/New Jersey Avenue to the east. The ZIP Code serving the neighborhood is 33607. The land area of the neighborhood is 0.486 square miles (1.26 km^{2}) and the population density was 3,608 persons per square mile.

== Demographics ==
The latest estimated population of the neighborhood is 1,754, with 836 males and 918 females. The median age for males is 42.8, while for females it is 47.7. The percentage of married couples in the neighborhood stands at 51%.

The median income for residents in the neighborhood is $36,875. The average family size is 2.6, and the average household size is approximately 3.0 persons.

== Education ==
Macfarlane Park is served by Hillsborough County Public Schools, which serves the city of Tampa and Hillsborough County.

== See also ==
- Northeast Macfarlane
