= Florence Villa =

- Neighborhood
- Location within the state of Florida
- Coordinates: 27°58′14″N 82°23′51″W
- Country: United States
- State: Florida
- County: Hillsborough
- City: Tampa
- Time zone: UTC-5 (Eastern (EST))
  - Summer (DST): UTC-4 (EDT)
- ZIP codes: 33605 and 33619
- Area code: 813

Florence Villa is a neighborhood within the city limits of Tampa, Florida. The ZIP Codes serving the neighborhood are 33605 and 33619. The neighborhood is part of the East Tampa region and is located within District Five of the Tampa City Council.

== Geography ==
Florence Villa boundaries are Uceta Yard to the south, Grant Park to the north, East Lake-Orient Park to the east, and Highland Pines to the west.

== Subdistricts ==
Florence Villa consists of two subdistricts, which are Oak Park and Beasley.

== See also ==
- Neighborhoods in Tampa, Florida
