= Rivercrest =

- Neighborhood
- Location within the state of Florida
- Coordinates: 27°59′36″N 82°27′44″W
- Country: United States
- State: Florida
- County: Hillsborough
- City: Tampa
- Elevation: 36 ft (11 m)
- Time zone: UTC-5 (Eastern (EST))
  - Summer (DST): UTC-4 (EDT)
- ZIP codes: 33603

Rivercrest is a neighborhood in the northern area of Tampa, Florida, which represents District 6 of the Tampa City Council. The 2000 census numbers were unavailable, however, the latest estimated population was 616.

== Geography ==
Rivercrest is located at 27.99334 and -82.462257. The elevation is 20 feet above sea level.

Rivercrest boundaries are roughly the Hillsborough River to the west, Hillsborough Avenue to the north, Violet Street to the south and Florida Avenue to the east. The ZIP Code serving the neighborhood is 33603. The land area of the neighborhood is 0.120 square miles (310,000 m^{2}) and the population density was 2,498 persons per square mile.

== Demographics ==
The latest estimated population was 616, which consists of 297 males and 319 females. The median age is 31.9 for males and 34.7 for females. The percentage of marriage couple stands at 31%.

The median income for the neighborhood is $43,049. The average family size is 2.9 and the average household size is approximately 2.3 persons.

== Education ==
Rivercrest is served by Hillsborough County Public Schools, which serves the city of Tampa and Hillsborough County.
