= Fern Cliff =

- Neighborhood
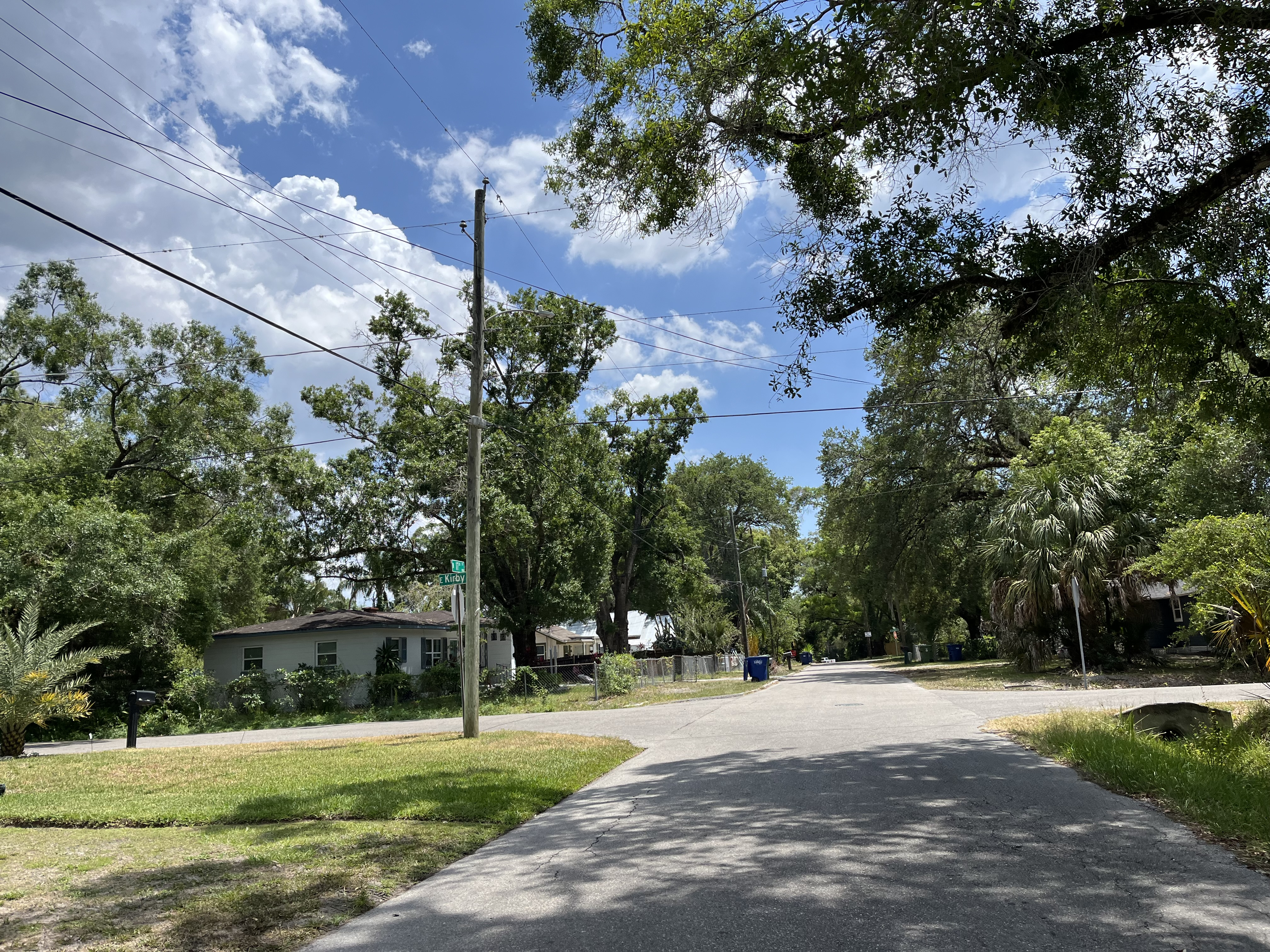

- Location within the state of Florida
- Coordinates: 28°1′8″N 82°26′28″W
- Country: United States
- State: Florida
- County: Hillsborough
- City: Tampa
- Elevation: 26 ft (7.9 m)
- Time zone: UTC-5 (Eastern (EST))
  - Summer (DST): UTC-4 (EDT)
- ZIP codes: 33604

Fern Cliff is a neighborhood in the Sulphur Springs section of Tampa, Florida, which represents District 5 of the Tampa City Council. The 2000 census numbers were unavailable, however, the latest estimated population was 1,083.

== Geography ==
Fern Cliff is located at 28.019 and -82.441. The elevation is 26 feet above sea level.

Fern Cliff is surrounded by the Hillsborough River on three sides. The ZIP Code serving the neighborhood is 33604. The land area of the neighborhood is 0.144 square miles (370,000 m^{2}) and the population density was 7,517 persons per square mile.

== Demographics ==
Source: Fern Cliff: city-data.com

The latest estimated population was 1,083, which consists of 508 males and 574 females. The median age is 22.9 for males and 22.3 for females. The percentage of marriage couple stands at 25.2%.

The median income for the neighborhood is $34,030. The average family size is 3.5 and the average household size is approximately 2.9 persons.

== Education ==
Fern Cliff is served by Hillsborough County Public Schools, which serves the city of Tampa and Hillsborough County.
