= Tampa Overlook =

- Neighborhood
- Location within the state of Florida
- Coordinates: 28°2′20″N 82°26′20″W
- Country: United States
- State: Florida
- County: Hillsborough
- City: Tampa
- Elevation: 30 ft (9.1 m)
- Time zone: UTC-5 (Eastern (EST))
  - Summer (DST): UTC-4 (EDT)
- ZIP codes: 33612

Tampa Overlook is a neighborhood in the North Tampa section of Tampa, which represents District 7 of the Tampa City Council. The 2000 census numbers were unavailable; however, the latest estimated population was 1,877 and the population density was 4,904 people per square mile.

== Geography ==
Tampa Overlook boundaries are roughly 15th Street to the west, Bougainvillea Avenue to the north, and Busch Boulevard/Annie Street to the south and 22nd Street to the east. The ZIP Code serving the neighborhood is 33612.

== Education ==
Tampa Overlook is served by Hillsborough County Public Schools, which serves the city of Tampa and Hillsborough County.
