= Beach Park =

Beach Park may refer to:

== America ==
- Beach Park, Illinois, a village in Illinois
- Beach Park (Tampa), a neighborhood in the City of Tampa, Florida
- Beach Park Isles, a neighborhood in the City of Tampa, Florida
- Beach Park (Galveston)
- Beach Park (Bakersfield), a public park adjacent to the Kern River in Bakersfield, California

== Elsewhere ==
- Beach Park (water park), a waterpark in Fortaleza, Brazil
- Beach View Park, a beach view park in Karachi, Pakistan
- Beach Park (Pärnu), park in Pärnu, Estonia
