= Harvey Heights (Tampa) =

- Neighborhood
- Location within the state of Florida
- Coordinates: 28°2′11″N 82°27′26″W
- Country: United States
- State: Florida
- County: Hillsborough
- City: Tampa
- Elevation: 36 ft (11 m)
- Time zone: UTC-5 (Eastern (EST))
  - Summer (DST): UTC-4 (EDT)
- ZIP codes: 33612

Harvey Heights is a neighborhood in the northern area of Tampa, Florida, which represents District 7 of the Tampa City Council. The 2000 census numbers were unavailable; however, the latest estimated population was 285.

== Geography ==
Harvey Heights is located at 28.037 and -82.457. The elevation is 36 feet above sea level.

Harvey Heights boundaries are roughly Florida Avenue to the west, Linebaugh Avenue to the north, Busch Boulevard to the south and Interstate 275 to the east. The ZIP Code serving the neighborhood is 33612. The land area of the neighborhood is 0.114 square miles (300,000 m^{2}) and the population density was 2,498 persons per square mile.

== Demographics ==
The latest estimated population was 285, which consists of 154 males and 131 females. The median age is 40.5 for males and 45.2 for females. The percentage of marriage couple stands at 12.1%.

The median income for the neighborhood is $18,175. The average family size is 2.4 and the average household size is approximately 1.5 persons.

== Education ==
Harvey Heights is served by Hillsborough County Public Schools, which serves the city of Tampa and Hillsborough County.
