= Grant Park (Tampa) =

- Neighborhood
- Location within the state of Florida
- Coordinates: 27°58′40″N 82°23′52″W
- Country: United States
- State: Florida
- County: Hillsborough
- City: Tampa

Population (2010)
  - Total: 1,840
- Time zone: UTC-5 (Eastern (EST))
  - Summer (DST): UTC-4 (EDT)
- ZIP codes: 33610 and 33619

Grant Park is a neighborhood within the East Tampa district of Tampa. As of the 2010 census the neighborhood had a population of 1,840. The ZIP Codes serving the area are 33610 and 33619.

== Geography ==
Grant Park boundaries are Uceta Yard to the south, Highland Pines to the west, East Lake-Orient Park to the east and north

== Demographics ==
Source: Hillsborough County Atlas

At the 2010 census there were 1,840 people and 558 households residing in the neighborhood. The population density was 7,493/mi^{2}. The racial makeup of the neighborhood was 19% White, 73% African American, 0% Native American, 1% Asian, 4% from other races, and 2% from two or more races. Hispanic or Latino of any race were about 15%.

Of the 558 households 39% had children under the age of 18 living with them, 23% were married couples living together, 42% had a female householder with no husband present, and 7% were non-families. 20% of households were made up of individuals.

The age distribution was 36% under the age of 18, 24% from 18 to 34, 20% from 35 to 49, 14% from 50 to 64, and 6% 65 or older. For every 100 females, there were 85.7 males.

The per capita income for the neighborhood was $8,652. About 40.0% of the population were below the poverty line.

== See also ==
- Neighborhoods in Tampa, Florida
