= Avila (Tampa) =

- Neighborhood
- Location within the state of Florida
- Coordinates: 28°06′32.4″N 82°27′39.6″W
- Country: United States
- State: Florida
- County: Hillsborough
- City: Tampa

Area
  - Total: 1.15 sq mi (2.98 km^{2})

Population (2010)
  - Total: 2,626
  - Density: 2,280/sq mi (879/km^{2})
- Time zone: UTC-5 (Eastern (EST))
  - Summer (DST): UTC-4 (EDT)
- ZIP codes: 33613

Avila is an affluent neighborhood in North Tampa, considered to be one of the most exclusive communities in Tampa, Florida. The gated community is occupied by star athletes, socialites, and professionals.

== History ==
Developer J. Robert "Bob" Sierra laid the groundwork for Avila in 1978. Surrounded by eight-foot walls, its name was inspired by the Spanish city of Ávila that was itself protected by imposing walls. The vast majority of the current homes in Avila were built in the 1980s. The neighborhood was created with various dining options and its centerpiece, the Avila Golf and Country Club. Amenities include six tennis courts, a swimming pool and fitness center, and an 18-hole course redesigned by famed golfer Jack Nicklaus in 1988.

PGA pros are on staff for private golf lessons. Avila was constructed with two entrances, one on Lake Magdalene Boulevard and another on North Florida Avenue. The neighborhood is guarded 24 hours a day and patrolled by security guards who use radar guns to monitor the speeds of vehicles. The security committee was once led by Tony Muniz, chairman of the Tampa Sports Authority.

== Geography ==
Avila's boundaries are roughly Highway 41 to the west, Crenshaw Lake Road to the north, and Lake Magdalene Boulevard to the south. The community contains a dozen lakes, a conservation area, and oak, cypress, and pine trees. The only street exceeding a mile in length is Guisando de Avila, measuring 1.17 miles in length.

== Demographics ==
As of 2010, Avila had a population of 2,626 with a median age of 53.6 years. Among the residents, 83.7% were born in America but only 39.3% were Florida natives. Nearly 83% of married-couple families contained two working parents and 13% of all households contained a single-mother.

== Economic data ==
The 700-acre community contains 395 residences where homes typically sell for $600,000 to $5 million. As of 2015, the median household income was $72,594. The average household contained 2.6 people with 42% of residences containing a minimum of nine rooms.

The neighborhood is zoned for the public institutions of Maniscalco Elementary School, Buchanan Middle School, and Gaither High School, but 47.6% of school-aged children attend private schools.

== Criminal Events ==
=== The Rivera Murders ===
On January 9, 2012, retired doctor Hector Rivera (76) and his wife Debra (55) were murdered at their Avila residence shortly before 8:00 p.m. Hector's body was found in his driveway at 814 Taray De Avila while Debra's body was located in a bathroom within the 11,000 sq ft (1,000 m^{2}) mansion. The following day, Debra's personal assistant and driver Julian Ospina-Florez (31) was arrested and charged with two counts of first-degree murder with theft noted as the motive. Ospina-Florez was found guilty on September 1, 2015, and sentenced to life in prison without the possibility of parole three days later.

=== The Campbell Murders ===
On the morning of May 7, 2014, Darrin Campbell (49) killed his wife Kimberly (51), his son Colin (18), and his daughter Megan (15), fatally shooting each in the head. The former executive at Pabst Brewing Company then attempted to cover up the crime by setting the $1 million mansion at 16223 Sierra De Avila on fire using gasoline and fireworks as an accelerant. He committed suicide as the house burned down, a home being leased by the Campbell family from former tennis professional James Blake.

== Notable residents present and past ==
This is a list of people who have lived in the Avila neighborhood at some time.

- Bruce Allen, NFL president of the Washington Redskins
- Adam Bilzerian, poker player
- Dan Bilzerian, poker player
- Paul Bilzerian, former corporate takeover specialist convicted of securities fraud
- Quincy Black, former NFL player with the Tampa Bay Buccaneers
- Eddie DeBartolo Jr., former NFL owner of the San Francisco 49ers
- Tony Dungy, former NFL coach of the Tampa Bay Buccaneers and the Indianapolis Colts
- Jon Gruden, former NFL coach of the Oakland Raiders and Tampa Bay Buccaneers
- Derek Jeter, former professional baseball player with the New York Yankees
- Joe Magrane, analyst for the MLB Network
- Vince Naimoli, businessman and founder of the Tampa Bay Rays (d. 2019)
- Lou Piniella, former professional baseball manager predominantly with the Seattle Mariners.
- Jorge Posada, former professional baseball player with the New York Yankees
- Mariano Rivera, former professional baseball player with the New York Yankees
- Warren Sapp, former NFL player predominantly with the Tampa Bay Buccaneers
- Nick Swisher, former professional baseball player with four different teams
- Roberto Alomar, former professional baseball player with eight different teams, primarily with the Toronto Blue Jays
- Alfonso Soriano, former professional baseball player with four different teams, primarily with the New York Yankees and Chicago Cubs
