= Eastern Heights =

Eastern Heights may refer to:

- Eastern Heights, Monroe County, Indiana
- Eastern Heights, Queensland
- Eastern Heights (Tampa), a neighborhood within the City of Tampa, Florida, United States
