= Stoney Point (Tampa) =

- Neighborhood
- Location within the state of Florida
- Coordinates: 27°55′41″N 82°31′39″W
- Country: United States
- State: Florida
- County: Hillsborough
- City: Tampa

Population (2000)
  - Total: 130
- Time zone: UTC-5 (Eastern (EST))
  - Summer (DST): UTC-4 (EDT)
- ZIP codes: 33629

Stoney Point is a neighborhood within the city limits of Tampa, Florida. As of the 2000 census the neighborhood had a population of 130. The ZIP code serving the area is 33629.

== Geography ==
Stoney Point is surrounded by Tampa Bay on three sides and Sunset Park on the east. The neighborhood is part of the South Tampa district.

== Demographics ==
Source: Hillsborough County Atlas

At the 2000 census there were 130 people and 50 households residing in the neighborhood. The population density was 4,585/mi^{2}. The racial makeup of the neighborhood was 99% White, 0% African American, 0% Native American, 0% Asian, 0% from other races, and none were from two or more races. Hispanic or Latino of any race were about 7%.

Of the 50 households 38% had children under the age of 18 living with them, 74% were married couples living together, 6% had a female householder with no husband present, and none were non-families. 20% of households were made up of individuals.

The age distribution was 27% under the age of 18, 10% from 18 to 34, 27% from 35 to 49, 24% from 50 to 64, and 13% 65 or older. For every 100 females, there were 100 males.

The per capita income for the neighborhood was $75,999. About 1% of the population were below the poverty line

== See also ==
- Neighborhoods in Tampa, Florida
