= Southern Pines (Tampa) =

- Neighborhood
- Location within the state of Florida
- Coordinates: 27°56′30″N 82°30′6″W
- Country: United States
- State: Florida
- County: Hillsborough
- City: Tampa

Population (2000)
  - Total: 194
- Time zone: UTC-5 (Eastern (EST))
  - Summer (DST): UTC-4 (EDT)
- ZIP codes: 33609

Southern Pines is a neighborhood within the city limits of Tampa, Florida. As of the 2000 census the neighborhood had a population of 194. The ZIP Code serving the neighborhood is 33609.

== Geography ==
Southern Pines is located to the east of Dale Mabry Highway in the vicinity of Kennedy Boulevard. The platted boundaries of the subdivision are Kennedy Boulevard to the North, Azeele Street to the South, Mac Dill Avenue on the East and South Beverly Avenue to the West. Because Henderson Boulevard bisects the neighborhood, the area to the West of Henderson is sometimes thought of as part of the Gray Gables neighborhood. The neighborhood is located within the South Tampa region.

== See also ==
- Neighborhoods in Tampa, Florida
