= Robles Park =

- Neighborhood
- Location within the state of Florida
- Coordinates: 27°58′26″N 82°27′18″W
- Country: United States
- State: Florida
- County: Hillsborough
- City: Tampa
- Time zone: UTC-5 (Eastern (EST))
  - Summer (DST): UTC-4 (EDT)

Robles Park is a neighborhood within the district of Tampa Heights, which represents District 5 of the Tampa City Council. Demographically, the neighborhood did not report separately. Robles Park is located at latitude 27.974 north and longitude 82.453 west. The elevation is 36 feet above sea level. The small neighborhood straddles between Florida and Nebraska Avenues and is mostly made up of a public housing complex known as Robles Park Village. It also contains a park and a collection of small single family home surrounding the public housing

== See also ==
- Neighborhoods in Tampa, Florida
