= Interbay =

Interbay may refer to:

- Interbay, Seattle, a neighborhood within the City of Seattle, Washington, United States
- Interbay (Tampa), a neighborhood within the City of Tampa, Florida, United States
