= Bowman Heights =

- Neighborhood
- Location within the state of Florida
- Coordinates: 27°58′5″N 82°28′44″W
- Country: United States
- State: Florida
- County: Hillsborough
- City: Tampa
- Time zone: UTC-5 (Eastern (EST))
  - Summer (DST): UTC-4 (EDT)

Bowman Heights is a neighborhood within the district of West Tampa, which represents District 6 of the Tampa City Council. Demographically, The neighborhood did not report separately.

== Geography ==
Bowman Heights is located at latitude 27.968 north and longitude 82.479 west. The elevation is 20 feet above sea level. Bowman Heights' boundaries include the Hillsborough River to the east, Howard Avenue to the west, and Columbus Drive to the north.

== See also ==
- West Tampa
- Neighborhoods in Tampa, Florida
