= Eastern Heights (Tampa) =

- Neighborhood
- Location within the state of Florida
- Coordinates: 27°58′53″N 82°24′12″W
- Country: United States
- State: Florida
- County: Hillsborough
- City: Tampa
- Time zone: UTC-5 (Eastern (EST))
  - Summer (DST): UTC-4 (EDT)
- ZIP codes: 33610

Eastern Heights is a neighborhood within the district of East Tampa, which represents District 5 of the Tampa City Council. The 2000 census numbers are included with East Tampa. The latest estimated population was 192 and the population density was 2,730 people per square mile.

== Geography ==
Eastern Heights boundaries are roughly 40th Street to the west, Chelsea Street to the north, and Lake Avenue to the south and east. The ZIP Code serving the neighborhood is 33610.

== Education ==
Eastern Heights is served by Hillsborough County Public Schools, which serves the city of Tampa and Hillsborough County.
