= Fair Oaks – Manhattan Manor =

Fair Oaks-Manhattan Manor
- Neighborhood
- Location within the state of Florida
- Coordinates: 27°54′2″N 82°30′31″W
- Country: United States
- State: Florida
- County: Hillsborough
- City: Tampa

Population (2010)
  - Total: 3,953
- Time zone: UTC-5 (Eastern (EST))
  - Summer (DST): UTC-4 (EDT)
- ZIP codes: 33611

Fair Oaks-Manhattan Manor is a neighborhood within the city limits of Tampa, Florida. As of the 2010 census, the neighborhood had a population of 3,953. The ZIP Code serving the neighborhood is 33611.

== Geography ==
Fair Oaks-Manhattan Manor boundaries are roughly Euclid Avenue to the north, Manhattan Avenue to the west, Gandy Blvd. to the south and Himes Avenue to the east. Dale Mabry Highway runs through the neighborhood.

== Demographics ==
Source: Hillsborough County Atlas

As of the census of 2010, there were 3,953 people and 2,014 households residing in the neighborhood. The population density was 3,841/mi^{2}. The racial makeup of the city was 86% White, 6% African American, 0.0% Native American, 2% Asian, 2% from other races, and 3% from two or more races. Hispanic or Latino of any race were 15.0% of the population.

There were 2,014 households, out of which 16% had children under the age of 18 living with them, 28% were married couples living together, 11% had a female householder with no husband present, and 12% were non-families. 46% of all households were made up of individuals.

In the neighborhood the population was spread out, with 15% under the age of 18, 25% from 18 to 34, 23% from 35 to 49, 20% from 50 to 64, and 19% who were 65 years of age or older. For every 100 females there were 86.4 males.

The per capita income for the neighborhood was $20,686. About 9% of the population were below the poverty line, including 23.0% of those under age 18 and 19.0% of those age 65 or over.

== Education ==
Fair Oaks-Manhattan Manor is served by Hillsborough County Public Schools, which serves Hillsborough County. Schools which are located within the neighborhood are Anderson Elementary and Madison Middle.

== See also ==
- Neighborhoods in Tampa, Florida
