= Beasley (Tampa) =

Neighborhood in Tampa, Florida

- Neighborhood
- Location within the state of Florida Beasley (the United States)
- Coordinates: 27°58′8″N 82°23′56″W
- Country: United States
- State: Florida
- County: Hillsborough
- City: Tampa
- Elevation: 36 ft (11 m)

Population (2000)
  - Total: 122
- Time zone: UTC-5 (Eastern (EST))
  - Summer (DST): UTC-4 (EDT)
- Area code: 813

Beasley is a neighborhood in Tampa, Florida, United States. The estimated population stands at 122. The neighborhood is part of the East Tampa region and is located within District Five of the Tampa City Council.

== Geography ==
Beasley is located at latitude 27.969 north and longitude 82.399 west. The elevation is 36 feet above sea level.

== Demographics ==
The median income for the neighborhood is $32,465, which is below citywide average.

In the neighborhood the population was spread out, with 22.9% under the age of 20, 29.1% from 20 to 39, 25.4% from 40 to 59, and 12.7% who were 60 years of age or older.

== Education ==
Beasley is served by Hillsborough County Public Schools, which serves the city of Tampa and Hillsborough County.

== See also ==
- Neighborhoods in Tampa, Florida
