= Interbay (Tampa) =

- Neighborhood
- Location within the state of Florida
- Coordinates: 27°53′17″N 82°30′14″W
- Country: United States
- State: Florida
- County: Hillsborough
- City: Tampa
- Time zone: UTC-5 (Eastern (EST))
  - Summer (DST): UTC-4 (EDT)

Interbay is a neighborhood located in the South Tampa district of Tampa, Florida. The estimated population stands at 638.

== Geography ==
Interbay is located at latitude 27.881 and longitude -82.504. The elevation is 13 feet above sea level. Interbay is bordered by Dale Mabry Highway to the west, MacDill Air Force Base to the south, Interbay Boulevard to the north and MacDill Avenue east.

== Demographics ==
The median income for the neighborhood is $39,840, which is above citywide average.

The age distribution was 25.4% under the age of 20, 33.1% from 20 to 39, 27.6% from 40 to 59, and 17.9% who were 60 years of age or older.

== See also ==
- South Tampa
- Neighborhoods in Tampa, Florida
