= Bayside West =

- Neighborhood
- Location within the state of Florida
- Coordinates: 27°56′12″N 82°31′34″W
- Country: United States
- State: Florida
- County: Hillsborough
- City: Tampa

Population (2000)
  - Total: 1,629
- Time zone: UTC-5 (Eastern (EST))
  - Summer (DST): UTC-4 (EDT)
- ZIP codes: 33611 and 33629
- Area code: 813

Bayside West is a neighborhood within the city limits of Tampa, Florida. As of the 2000 census the neighborhood had a population of 1,629. The ZIP Codes serving the area are 33611 and 33629.

== Geography ==
Bayside West boundaries are Bay Villa Avenue to the north, Tampa Bay to the west, U.S. Route 92 (Gandy Boulevard) to the south, and Manhattan Avenue to the east. The neighborhood is part of South Tampa district.

== Demographics ==
The median income for the neighborhood is $37,262, which is slightly above citywide average.

The age distribution was 15.6% under the age of 20, 35.8% from 20 to 39, 22.4% from 40 to 59, and 26.4% who were 60 years of age or older. The average household size 1.773, which is below the citywide average of 2.36 and The percentage of homes with children is 13.2, which is below the citywide average of 25.2%

== Education ==
Bayside West is served by Hillsborough County Public Schools, which serves the city of Tampa and Hillsborough County. Madison Middle is located within the neighborhood.

== See also ==
- Neighborhoods in Tampa, Florida
