= South Westshore =

- Neighborhood
- Location within the state of Florida
- Coordinates: 27°54′28″N 82°31′27″W
- Country: United States
- State: Florida
- County: Hillsborough
- City: Tampa

Population (2000)
  - Total: 4,597
- Time zone: UTC-5 (Eastern (EST))
  - Summer (DST): UTC-4 (EDT)
- ZIP codes: 33611 and 33629

South Westshore is a neighborhood within the city limits of Tampa, Florida. As of the 2000 census the neighborhood had a population of 4,597. The ZIP Codes serving the neighborhood are 33611 and 33629. The neighborhood is located just south of the Westshore Business District.

== Geography ==
South Westshore boundaries are the Leona Street to the north, Tampa Bay to the west, Gandy Blvd. to the south, and Manhattan Avenue to the east.

== Demographics ==
Source: Hillsborough County Atlas

At the 2000 census there were 4,597 people and 2,328 households residing in the neighborhood. The population density was 5,258/mi^{2}. The racial makeup of the neighborhood was 93.0% White, 2.0% African American, 0% Native American, 3.0% Asian, less than 1.0% from other races, and 1.0% from two or more races. Hispanic or Latino of any race were 9.0%.

Of the 2,328 households 21% had children under the age of 18 living with them, 38% were married couples living together, 5% had a female householder with no husband present, and 8% were non-families. 45% of households were made up of individuals.

The age distribution was 18% under the age of 18, 23% from 18 to 34, 24% from 35 to 49, 13% from 50 to 64, and 24% 65 or older. For every 100 females, there were 88.3 males.

The per capita income for the neighborhood was $28,025.

== See also ==
- Neighborhoods in Tampa, Florida
