= Ridgewood Park (Tampa) =

- Neighborhood
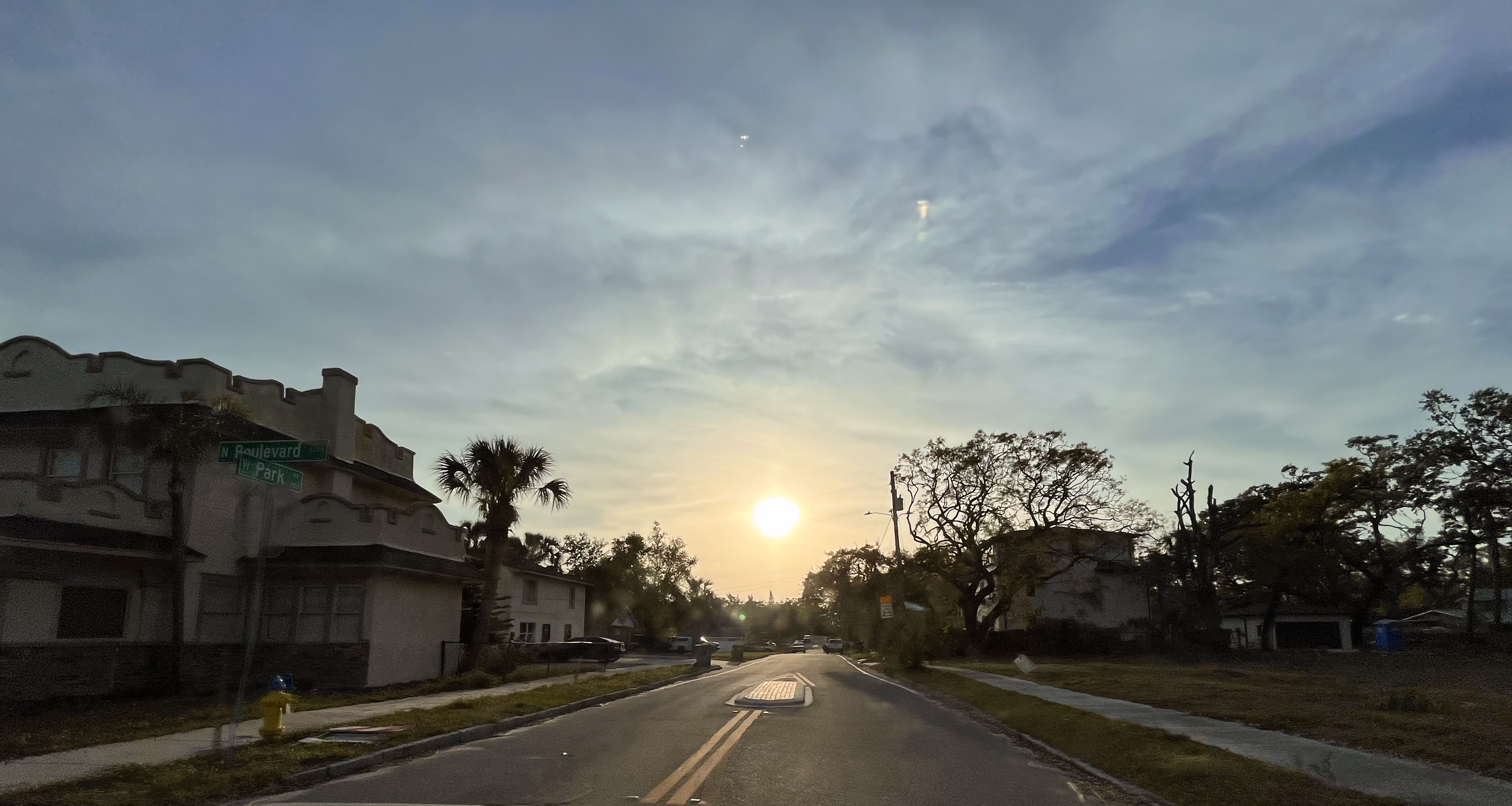

- Location within the state of Florida
- Coordinates: 27°57′52″N 82°28′14″W
- Country: United States
- State: Florida
- County: Hillsborough
- City: Tampa

Population (2000)
  - Total: 379
- Time zone: UTC-5 (Eastern (EST))
  - Summer (DST): UTC-4 (EDT)
- ZIP codes: 33602

Ridgewood Park is a neighborhood within the city limits of Tampa, Florida. As of the 2000 census, the neighborhood had a population of 379. The ZIP Code serving the area is 33602.

== Geography ==
Ridgewood Park's boundaries are North Boulevard to the east, Columbus Boulevard to the north, and the Hillsborough River to the south and west.

== Demographics ==
Source: Hillsborough County Atlas

At the 2000 census, there were 379 people and 181 households residing in the neighborhood. The population density was 2,935/mi^{2}. The racial makeup of the neighborhood was 53.0% White, 44.0% African American, 0.0% Native American, 0.0% Asian, 0.0% from other races, and 4.0% from two or more races. Hispanic or Latino of any race were about 7.0%.

Of the 181 households, 19% had children under the age of 18 living with them; 43% were married couples living together; 10% had a female householder with no husband present; and 8% were non-families. 30% of households were made up of individuals.

The age distribution was 13% under the age of 18, 23% from 18 to 34, 26% from 35 to 49, 14% from 50 to 64, and 25% 65 or older. For every 100 females, there were 101 males.

The per capita income for the neighborhood was $24,798. About 6% of the population lived below the poverty line.

== Education ==
Ridgewood Park is served by Hillsborough County Public Schools, which serves the city of Tampa and Hillsborough County. Madison Middle School is located within the neighborhood.

== See also ==
- Neighborhoods in Tampa, Florida
