= Culbreath Bayou =

- Neighborhood
- Location within the state of Florida
- Coordinates: 27°55′53″N 82°31′18″W
- Country: United States
- State: Florida
- County: Hillsborough
- City: Tampa

Population (2000)
  - Total: 290
- Time zone: UTC-5 (Eastern (EST))
  - Summer (DST): UTC-4 (EDT)
- ZIP codes: 33629

Culbreath Bayou is a neighborhood within the city limits of Tampa, Florida. As of the 2000 census the neighborhood had a population of 290. The ZIP Code serving the neighborhood is 33629. It was named after Col. Harry Culbreath, who came to Tampa following the Civil War, fleeing his war-torn home state of South Carolina, cultivating oranges and raising cattle on his land.

== Geography ==
Culbreath Bayou boundaries are Watrous Ave. to the north, Dunbar to the east, Neptune St. to the South, and West Shore Boulevard to the west.

== Demographics ==
Source: Hillsborough County Atlas

At the 2000 census there were 290 people and 95 households in the neighborhood. The population density was 5,058/mi^{2}. The racial makeup of the neighborhood was 96% White, 0% African American, 0% Native American, 0% Asian, 1% from other races, and 2% from two or more races. Hispanic or Latino of any race were 6%.

Of the 290 households 29% had children under the age of 18 living with them, 75% were married couples living together, 7% had a female householder with no husband present, and none were non-families. 15% of households were made up of individuals.

The age distribution was 37% under the age of 18, 6% from 18 to 34, 30% from 35 to 49, 14% from 50 to 64, and 13% 65 or older. For every 100 females, there were 100 males.

The per capita income for the neighborhood was $55,121. About 4% of the population was below the poverty line.

== See also ==
- Neighborhoods in Tampa, Florida
