= Golf View =

- Neighborhood
- Location within the state of Florida
- Coordinates: 27°56′1″N 82°29′53″W
- Country: United States
- State: Florida
- County: Hillsborough
- City: Tampa

Population (2010)
  - Total: 226
- Time zone: UTC-5 (Eastern (EST))
  - Summer (DST): UTC-4 (EDT)
- ZIP codes: 33609 and 33629

Golf View is a neighborhood within the South Tampa district of Tampa. As of the 2010 census the neighborhood had a population of 226. The ZIP Codes serving the area are 33609 and 33629.

== Geography ==
Golf View boundaries are Palma Ceia to the south, Palma Ceia West to the west, New Suburb Beautiful to the east and Grey Gables to the north

== Demographics ==
Source: Hillsborough County Atlas

At the 2010 census there were 226 people and 87 households residing in the neighborhood. The population density was 2,326/mi^{2}. The racial makeup of the neighborhood was 94% White, 3% African American, 1% Native American, 1% Asian, 0% from other races, and 1% from two or more races. Hispanic or Latino of any race were about 7%.

Of the 87 households 35% had children under the age of 18 living with them, 58% were married couples living together, 8% had a female householder with no husband present, and 6% were non-families. 28% of households were made up of individuals.

The age distribution was 26% under the age of 18, 10% from 18 to 34, 24% from 35 to 49, 24% from 50 to 64, and 13% 65 or older. For every 100 females, there were 97.4 males.

The per capita income for the neighborhood was $70,941. About 2% of the population were below the poverty line.

== See also ==
- Neighborhoods in Tampa, Florida
