= West Meadows =

- Neighborhood
- Location within the state of Florida
- Coordinates: 28°8′53″N 82°22′55″W
- Country: United States
- State: Florida
- County: Hillsborough
- City: Tampa
- Time zone: UTC-5 (Eastern (EST))
  - Summer (DST): UTC-4 (EDT)
- Website: http://www.west-meadows.org

West Meadows is a neighborhood located in the New Tampa district of Tampa, Florida. The estimated population stands at 2,381.

== Geography ==
West Meadows is located at latitude 28.148 north and longitude 82.382 west. The elevation is 46 feet above sea level. It is bordered by Bruce B. Downs Boulevard to the east and much of Interstate 75 to the west.

== Demographics ==
The median income for the neighborhood is $67,183, which is above citywide average.

Of the neighborhoods residents, 26.9% were under the age of 20, 42.8% were aged from 20 to 39, 24.3% from 40 to 59, and 6.1% were 60 years of age or older.

== Education ==
West Meadows is served by Hillsborough County Public Schools, which serves the city of Tampa and Hillsborough County. Clark Elementary is located within the neighborhood.

== See also ==
- New Tampa
- Neighborhoods in Tampa, Florida
