= Rembrandt Gardens =

- Neighborhood
- Location within the state of Florida
- Coordinates: 27°52′20″N 82°30′49″W
- Country: United States
- State: Florida
- County: Hillsborough
- City: Tampa

Population (2000)
  - Total: 134
- Time zone: UTC-5 (Eastern (EST))
  - Summer (DST): UTC-4 (EDT)
- ZIP codes: 33616

Rembrandt Gardens is a neighborhood within the city limits of Tampa, Florida. As of the 2000 census the neighborhood had a population of 134. The ZIP Code serving the area 33616.

== Geography ==
Rembrandt Gardens boundaries are Lois Avenue to the east, Manhattan Avenue to the west, Interbay Boulevard to the south, and Rembrandt Drive to the north.

== Demographics ==
Source: Hillsborough County Atlas

At the 2010 census there were 370 people living in the neighborhood. The population density was 1,196/mi^{2}. The racial makeup of the neighborhood was 44% White, 25% African American, 1% Native American, 6% Asian, 14% from other races, and 9% from two or more races. Hispanic or Latino of any race were about 38%.

Of the 56 households 38% had children under the age of 18 living with them, 30% were married couples living together, 22% had a female householder with no husband present, and 9% non-families. 35% of households were made up of individuals.

The age distribution was 32% under the age of 18, 27% from 18 to 34, 26% from 35 to 49, 13% from 50 to 64, and 6% 65 or older. For every 100 females, there were 90 males.

The per capita income for the neighborhood was $10,712. About 29% of the population were below the poverty line. Of those, 44% are under the age of 18.

== See also ==
- Neighborhoods in Tampa, Florida
