= North Bon Air =

- Neighborhood
- Location within the state of Florida
- Coordinates: 27°56′55″N 82°30′35″W
- Country: United States
- State: Florida
- County: Hillsborough
- City: Tampa

Population (2010)
  - Total: 1,098
- Time zone: UTC-5 (Eastern (EST))
  - Summer (DST): UTC-4 (EDT)

North Bon Air is a neighborhood within the city limits of Tampa, Florida, USA. As of the 2010 census the neighborhood had a population of 1,098. The ZIP Codes serving the area are 33607 and 33609.

== Geography ==
North Bon Air boundaries are Dale Mabry Highway to the east, Westshore Palms to the west, Kennedy Boulevard Boulevard to the south, and Interstate 275 to the north.

== Demographics ==
Source: Hillsborough County Atlas

At the 2010 census there were 1,098 people and 465 households residing in the neighborhood. The population density was 4,037/mi^{2}. The racial makeup of the neighborhood was 78.0% White, 11.0% African American, 0.0% Native American, 2.0% Asian, 4.0% from other races, and 5.0% from two or more races. Hispanic or Latino of any race were about 45.0%.

Of the 465 households 19% had children under the age of 18 living with them, 39% were married couples living together, 16% had a female householder with no husband present, and 11% non-families. 29% of households were made up of individuals.

The age distribution was 15% under the age of 18, 23% from 18 to 34, 22% from 35 to 49, 20% from 50 to 64, and 18% 65 or older. For every 100 females, there were 99.1 males.

The per capita income for the neighborhood was $24,095. About 9% of the population were below the poverty line. Of those, 33% are under age 18.

== See also ==
- Neighborhoods in Tampa, Florida
