= Rainbow Heights, Tampa =

District in Tampa, Florida

Rainbow Heights is a district in Tampa, Florida.

== See also ==
- Neighborhoods in Tampa, Florida
