= Wellswood, Florida =

Wellswood
- Neighborhood
- Location within the state of Florida
- Coordinates: 27°59′13″N 82°28′50″W
- Country: United States
- State: Florida
- County: Hillsborough
- City: Tampa

Population (2000)
  - Total: 4,126
- Time zone: UTC-5 (Eastern (EST))
  - Summer (DST): UTC-4 (EDT)
- ZIP codes: 33603, 33607, and 33614

Wellswood is a working class to middle-class neighborhood within the city limits of Tampa, Florida. As of the 2000 census the neighborhood had a population of 4,126. The ZIP Codes serving the neighborhood are 33603, 33607, and 33614.

== Geography ==
Wellswood boundaries are Hillsborough Avenue to the north, Hillsborough River to the east, Dr. Martin Luther King Jr. Blvd. to the south, and Armenia Avenue to the west.

== Demographics ==
Source: Hillsborough County Atlas

At the 2000 census there were 4,126 people and 1,836 households residing in the neighborhood. The population density was 4,404/mi^{2}. The racial makeup of the neighborhood was 76.0% White, 15.0% African American, 0.0% Native American, 1.0% Asian, less than 4.0% from other races, and 4.0% from two or more races. Hispanic or Latino of any race were 33.0%. Still today the neighborhood has many residents of Cuban, Spanish, and Italian descent.

Of the 1,836 households 20% had children under the age of 18 living with them, 32% were married couples living together, 16% had a female householder with no husband present, and 10% were non-families. 38% of households were made up of individuals.

The age distribution was 24% under the age of 18, 27% from 18 to 34, 19% from 35 to 49, 11% from 50 to 64, and 20% 65 or older. For every 100 females, there were 82.2 males.

The per capita income for the neighborhood was $17,169. About 14.0% of the population were below the poverty line, including 20.0% of those under age 18 and 20.0% of those age 65 or over.

== History ==
Wellswood derives its name from the Wells family who originally purchased the 640 acres (2.6 km^{2}) on which the community sits. The Wellswood community center was deeded by James F. and Edna Wells Wishart in 1949 and the first house was built in 1950. Wellswood was originally known as Wells Park but was renamed due to the abundance of pine and oak trees in the area.

== See also ==
- Neighborhoods in Tampa, Florida
