= Bayshore Beautiful =

- Neighborhood
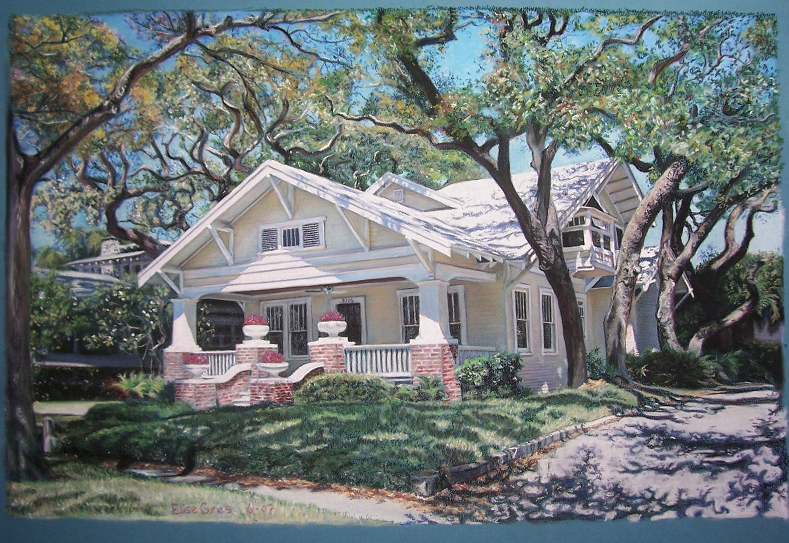
- Elise Ippolito House Portrait - Bayshore Beautiful House

- Location within the state of Florida
- Coordinates: 27°54′2″N 82°29′53″W
- Country: United States
- State: Florida
- County: Hillsborough
- City: Tampa

Population (2010)
  - Total: 5,931
- Time zone: UTC-5 (Eastern (EST))
  - Summer (DST): UTC-4 (EDT)
- ZIP codes: 33611 and 33629
- Area code: 813

Bayshore Beautiful is a neighborhood within the city limits of Tampa, Florida, United States. As of the 2010 census, its population was 5,931. The ZIP Codes serving the area are 33611 and 33629.

== Geography ==
Bayshore Beautiful boundaries are El Prado Boulevard to the north, Virginia Park to the west, Ballast Point to the southeast, Sun Bay South to the southwest, and Bayshore Boulevard to the east.

== Demographics ==
Source: Hillsborough County Atlas

At the 2010 census there were 5,931 people and 2,601 households residing in the neighborhood. The population density was 6,156/mi^{2}. The racial makeup of the neighborhood was 92% White, 2% African American, less than 1% Native American, 2% Asian, and 2% from two or more races. Hispanic or Latino of any race were about 11%.

Of the 2,601 households 25% had children under the age of 18 living with them, 49% were married couples living together, 6% had a female householder with no husband present, and 8% non-families. 33% of households were made up of individuals.

The age distribution was 21% under the age of 18, 16% from 18 to 34, 26% from 35 to 49, 21% from 50 to 64, and 16% 65 or older. For every 100 females, there were 96.4 males.

The per capita income for the neighborhood was $45,047. About 5% of the population were below the poverty line. Of those, 9% are under age 18.

== Dining and shopping ==
Between Bayview and Wallcraft Avenues on MacDill Avenue, there is a small district of bars, cafes and shops. This area is considered part of the expanded definition of the Palma Ceia Design District even though it is outside of Palma Ceia's boundaries.

== See also ==
- Hyde Park
- Neighborhoods in Tampa, Florida
- Palma Ceia
