= Swann Estates =

- Neighborhood
- Location within the state of Florida
- Coordinates: 27°56′22″N 82°30′36″W
- Country: United States
- State: Florida
- County: Hillsborough
- City: Tampa

Population (2000)
  - Total: 1,491
- Time zone: UTC-5 (Eastern (EST))
  - Summer (DST): UTC-4 (EDT)
- ZIP codes: 33609 and 33629

Swann Estates is a neighborhood within the city limits of Tampa, Florida. As of the 2000 census the neighborhood had a population of 1,491. The ZIP Codes serving the neighborhood are 33609 and 33629.

== Geography ==
Swann Estates boundaries are John F. Kennedy Boulevard to the north, Dale Mabry Highway to the east, Morrison Avenue to the south, and Lois Avenue to the West

== Demographics ==
Source: Hillsborough County Atlas

As of the census of 2000, there were 1,491 people and 725 households residing in the neighborhood. The population density was 3,907.25/mi^{2}. The racial makeup of the neighborhood was 86% White, 4% African American, 1% Native American, 1% Asian, 6% from other races, and 1% from two or more races. Hispanic or Latino of any race were 13% of the population.

There were 725 households, out of which 23% had children under the age of 18 living with them, 40% were married couples living together, 8% had a female householder with no husband present, and 10% were non-families. 37% of all households were made up of individuals.

In the neighborhood the population was spread out, with 19% under the age of 18, 20% from 18 to 34, 32% from 35 to 49, 14% from 50 to 64, and 16% who were 65 years of age or older. For every 100 females, there were 98.1 males.

The per capita income for the neighborhood was $30,647. About 7% of the population were below the poverty line.

== See also ==
- Neighborhoods in Tampa, Florida
