= Bel Mar Shores =

- Neighborhood
- Location within the state of Florida
- Coordinates: 27°54′41″N 82°31′44″W
- Country: United States
- State: Florida
- County: Hillsborough
- City: Tampa

Population (2010)
  - Total: 438
- Time zone: UTC-5 (Eastern (EST))
  - Summer (DST): UTC-4 (EDT)
- ZIP codes: 33611 and 33629
- Area code: 813

Bel Mar Shores is a neighborhood within the city limits of Tampa, Florida. As of the 2010 census the neighborhood had a population of 438. This neighborhood is located within the ZIP Code 33629.

== Geography ==
Bel Mar Shores boundaries are Spring Lake Dr. to the north, Old Tampa Bay to the west, South Westshore to the east and Euclid Ave to the south. The neighborhood is part of the South Tampa district.

== Demographics ==
Source: Hillsborough County Atlas

As of the census of 2010, there were 438 people and 138 households residing in the neighborhood. The population density was 4,871/mi^{2}. The racial makeup of the neighborhood was 91% White, 3% African American, 0% Native American, 3% Asian, 1% from other races, and 2% from two or more races. Hispanic or Latino of any race were 11% of the population.

There were 138 households, out of which 29% had children under the age of 18 living with them, 48% were married couples living together, 13% had a female householder with no husband present, and 9% were non-families. 26% of all households were made up of individuals.

In the neighborhood the population was spread out, with 23% under the age of 18, 17% from 18 to 34, 26% from 35 to 49, 21% from 50 to 64, and 15% who were 65 years of age or older. For every 100 females, there were 98.2 males.

The per capita income for the neighborhood was $31,661. About 2% of the population were below the poverty line. Of those, 2% are under age 18.

== See also ==
- Neighborhoods in Tampa, Florida
