= Marina Club =

- Neighborhood
- Location within the state of Florida
- Coordinates: 27°58′26″N 82°29′1″W
- Country: United States
- State: Florida
- County: Hillsborough
- City: Tampa

Population (2000)
  - Total: 135
- Time zone: UTC-5 (Eastern (EST))
  - Summer (DST): UTC-4 (EDT)
- ZIP codes: 33602, 33603 and 33607

Marina Club or Marina Club of Tampa is a gated residential condominium neighborhood located along the Hillsborough River within the city limits of Tampa, Florida.

As of the 2000 census the neighborhood had a population of 135. Although small the neighborhood is within three ZIP Codes: 33602, 33603 and 33607. The Marina Club of Tampa is a Homeowners Association currently managed by The Continental Group, Inc.

== Geography ==
Marina Club boundaries are Tampa Bay Boulevard to the north, Cimino Avenue to the west, Abdella Street to the south and the Hillsborough River to the east. The neighborhood is part of the historic West Tampa district.

== Demographics ==
Source: Hillsborough County Atlas

As of the census of 2000 there were 135 people and 68 households residing in the neighborhood. The population density was 3,987/mi^{2}. The racial makeup of the neighborhood was 81% White, 9% African American, 1% Native American, 3% Asian, 5% from other races, and 1% from two or more races. Hispanic or Latino of any race were 45% of the population.

Of the 68 households 13% had children under the age of 18 living with them, 49% were married couples living together, 3% had a female householder with no husband present, and 7% were non-families. 39% of households were made up of individuals.

The age distribution was 14% under the age of 18, 16% from 18 to 34, 16% from 35 to 49, 28% from 50 to 64, and 27% 65 or older. For every 100 females, there were 95.7 males.

The per capita income for the neighborhood was $24,291. About 7% of the population were below the poverty line. Of those 2% are under age 18.

== See also ==
- Neighborhoods in Tampa, Florida
