= Neighborhoods in Tampa, Florida =

The city of Tampa, Florida is officially divided into six geographical regions: New Tampa, West Tampa, Brooklyn Village, Downtown Tampa, Ybor City, and Channel District each coinciding with a respective Tampa City Council district. The neighborhoods are managed by Neighborhood and Community Relations, a department under Neighborhood Services, a city department which serves as a resource for residents and businesses.

The following are a list of major neighborhoods in the city of Tampa, Florida, United States, organized by broad geographical location within the city.

== Neighborhoods and districts ==
There are six historic districts and around 84 officially named neighborhoods of Tampa along with other subdistricts not reported separately by the city.

=== Historic districts ===
- Hampton Terrace Historic District
- Hyde Park
- Seminole Heights
- Tampa Heights
- West Tampa
- Ybor City

=== Residential neighborhoods ===
- Armenia Gardens Estates
- Audubon Park
- Ballast Point
- Bayshore Beautiful
- Bayshore Gardens
- Bayside West
- Beach Park
- Beach Park Isles
- Beasley
- Bel Mar Shores
- Bon Air
- Carver City-Lincoln Gardens
- Channel District
- College Hill
- Culbreath Bayou
- Culbreath Heights
- Culbreath Isles
- Davis Islands
- Dixie Farms
- Drew Park
- Eastern Heights
- East Tampa
  - Belmont Heights
  - Jackson Heights
  - Rainbow Heights
- East Ybor
- Fair Oaks - Manhattan Manor
- Fern Cliff
- Florence Villa
- Forest Hills
- Gandy-Sun Bay South
- Golf View
- Grant Park
- Gray Gables
- Harvey Heights
- Highland Pines
- Historic Hyde Park North
- Hyde Park Spanishtown Creek
- Harbour Island
- Hunter's Green
- Interbay
- Live Oaks Square
- Lowry Park
- Lowry Park North
- Maryland Manor
- New Suburb Beautiful
- North Bon Air
- Northeast Community
- North Hyde Park
- North Tampa
- Northview Hills
- Oakford Park
- Oak Park
- Old Seminole Heights
- Palma Ceia
- Palma Ceia Pines
- Palma Ceia West
- Palmetto Beach
- Parkland Estates
- Port Tampa
- Rainbow Heights
- Rattlesnake
- Rembrandt Gardens
- Ridgewood Park
- River Arts District
- Riverbend
- Rivercrest
- River Grove
- Riverside Heights
- Robles Park
- The Scrub
- Soho District
- South Seminole Heights
- Southeast Seminole Heights
- Southern Pines
- South Nebraska
- South Westshore
- Sulphur Springs
- Sunset Park
- Swann Estates
- Tampa Overlook
- Tampa Palms
- Temple Crest
- Terrace Park
- University Square
- V.M. Ybor
- Virginia Park
- Wellswood
- West Hyde Park
- West Meadows
- West Tampa
  - Bowman Heights
  - MacFarlane Park
  - Marina Club
  - Northeast Macfarlane
  - Old West Tampa
- Water Street, Tampa
- West Riverfront
- Westshore Palms
- Woodland Terrace

=== Central business districts ===
- Downtown Tampa
  - Uptown Tampa, a subdistrict in the northwestern section of Downtown Tampa.
- Westshore Business District

== Other divisions and designations ==
There have been a number of divisions of Tampa, some of which are still used in common local conversation, but which do not correspond with Neighborhood and Community Relations designations.

=== Industrial areas ===
- Garrison Channel
- Gary
- Uceta Yard

=== Other areas ===
- Rocky Point
- Soho District, a subdistrict within Hyde Park
