= Westshore Palms =

- Neighborhood
- Location within the state of Florida
- Coordinates: 27°56′52″N 82°30′57″W
- Country: United States
- State: Florida
- County: Hillsborough
- City: Tampa

Population (2000)
  - Total: 1,430
- Time zone: UTC-5 (Eastern (EST))
  - Summer (DST): UTC-4 (EDT)
- ZIP codes: 33609

Westshore Palms is a neighborhood within the city limits of Tampa, Florida. As of the 2000 census the neighborhood had a population of 1,430. The ZIP Code serving the neighborhood is 33609. The neighborhood is close to Westshore Plaza and the Westshore Business District.

== Geography ==
The boundaries of Westshore Palms are Interstate 275 to the north, Lois Avenue to the east, Kennedy Blvd. to the south, and Westshore Blvd. to the west.

== Demographics ==
Source: Hillsborough County Atlas

At the 2000 census there were 1,430 people and 809 households residing in the neighborhood. The population density was 7,285/mi^{2}. The racial makeup of the neighborhood was 83.0% White, 8.0% African American, 0.0% Native American, 5.0% Asian, less than 1.0% from other races, and 3.0% from two or more races. Hispanic or Latino of any race were 24.0%.

Of the 809 households 8% had children under the age of 18 living with them, 18% were married couples living together, 4% had a female householder with no husband present, and 11% were non-families. 52% of households were made up of individuals.

The age distribution was 12% under the age of 18, 20% from 18 to 34, 27% from 35 to 49, 17% from 50 to 64, and 24% 65 or older. For every 100 females, there were 98 males.

The per capita income for the neighborhood was $21,160. About 13.0% of the population were below the poverty line, including 4% of those under age 18.

== See also ==
- Neighborhoods in Tampa, Florida
