= Highland Pines =

- Neighborhood
- Location within the state of Florida
- Coordinates: 27°58′22″N 82°24′28″W
- Country: United States
- State: Florida
- County: Hillsborough
- City: Tampa

Population (2010)
  - Total: 1,539
- Time zone: UTC-5 (Eastern (EST))
  - Summer (DST): UTC-4 (EDT)
- ZIP codes: 33605, 33610, and 33619

Highland Pines near Prescott in Yavapai County, Arizona, United States

Highland Pines is a neighborhood within the city limits of Tampa, Florida. As of the 2010 census the neighborhood had a population of 1,539. The ZIP Codes serving the neighborhood are 33605, 33610, and 33619. The neighborhood is part of the East Tampa region and is located within District Five of the Tampa City Council.

== Geography ==
Highland Pines boundaries are Uceta Yard to the south, the Lake Avenue to the north, Grant Park to the northeast, Florence Villa to the southeast and Belmont Heights-Jackson Heights to the west.

== Demographics ==
Source: Hillsborough County Atlas

As of the census of 2010, there were 1,539 people and 502 households residing in the neighborhood. The population density was 2,202/mi^{2}. The racial makeup of the neighborhood was 13% White, 81% African American, 1% Native American, 1% Asian, 3% from other races, and 2% from two or more races. Hispanic or Latino of any race were about 7% of the population.

There were 502 households, out of which 25% had children under the age of 18 living with them, 25% were married couples living together, 34% had a female householder with no husband present, and 8% were non-families. 22% of all households were made up of individuals.

In the neighborhood the population was spread out, with 26% under the age of 18, 10% from 18 to 34, 24% from 35 to 49, 24% from 50 to 64, and 13% who were 65 years of age or older. For every 100 females, there were 97.4 males.

The per capita income for the neighborhood was $12,616. About 29% of the population were below the poverty line.

== See also ==
- Neighborhoods in Tampa, Florida
- Highland Pines, Prescott Arizona, Yavapai County
