= North Hyde Park =

- Neighborhood
- Location within the state of Florida
- Coordinates: 27°57′2″N 82°28′41″W
- Country: United States
- State: Florida
- County: Hillsborough
- City: Tampa

Population (2010)
  - Total: 1,770
- Time zone: UTC-5 (Eastern (EST))
  - Summer (DST): UTC-4 (EDT)
- ZIP codes: 33606, 33607 and 33609

North Hyde Park is a neighborhood within the city limits of Tampa, Florida. As of the 2010 census the neighborhood had a population of 1,770. The ZIP Codes serving the neighborhood are 33606, 33607 and 33609.

== Geography ==
North Hyde Park boundaries are Interstate 275 to the north, Kennedy Boulevard to the south, Armenia Avenue. to the west, and Willow Avenue to the east.

== Demographics ==
Source: Hillsborough County Atlas

At the 2010 census there were 1,770 people and 688 households residing in the neighborhood. The population density was 4,229/mi^{2}. The racial makeup of the neighborhood was 38% White, 56% African American, less than 0.5% Native American, less than 0.5% Asian, 3% from other races, and 2% from two or more races. Hispanic or Latino of any race were 19%.

Of the 688 households 21% had children under the age of 18 living with them, 23% were married couples living together, 23% had a female householder with no husband present, and 14% were non-families. 32% of households were made up of individuals.

The age distribution was 20% under the age of 18, 29% from 18 to 34, 21% from 35 to 49, 19% from 50 to 64, and 13% 65 or older. For every 100 females, there were 108.1 males.

The per capita income for the neighborhood was $16,281. About 26% of the population were below the poverty line. 32% of those under age 18 and 14% of those age 65 or over.

== See also ==
- Hyde Park
- Neighborhoods in Tampa, Florida
