= Northeast Macfarlane =

- Neighborhood
- Location within the state of Florida
- Coordinates: 27°57′29″N 82°29′50″W
- Country: United States
- State: Florida
- County: Hillsborough
- City: Tampa

Population (2010)
  - Total: 8,554
- Time zone: UTC-5 (Eastern (EST))
  - Summer (DST): UTC-4 (EDT)
- ZIP codes: 33607

Northeast Macfarlane is a neighborhood within the city limits of Tampa, Florida. As of the 2010 census the neighborhood had a population of 8,554. The ZIP Code serving the neighborhood is 33607.

== Points of interest ==
Just to the north of the neighborhood, points of interest include George M. Steinbrenner Field, home of the Tampa Yankees minor league baseball club and home to the New York Yankees spring training site and Raymond James Stadium; home of the NFL's Tampa Bay Buccaneers Many small Cuban eateries are located here as well.

== Geography ==
Northeast MacFarlane boundaries are Tampa Bay Boulevard to the north, Dale Mabry Highway to the west, Interstate 275 to the south and Old West Tampa to the east. The neighborhood is part of the West Tampa district.

== Demographics ==
Source: Hillsborough County Atlas

As of the census of 2010, there were 8,554 people and 3,146 households residing in the neighborhood. The population density was 5,473/mi^{2}. The racial makeup of the neighborhood was 76% White, 12% African American, less than 1% Native American, 1% Asian, 6% from other races, and 4% from two or more races. Hispanic or Latino of any race were 74% of the population.

There were 3,146 households, out of which 25% had children under the age of 18 living with them, 38% were married couples living together, 19% had a female householder with no husband present, and 8% were non-families. 27% of all households were made up of individuals.

In the neighborhood the population was spread out, with 23% under the age of 18, 20% from 18 to 34, 21% from 35 to 49, 16% from 50 to 64, and 19% who were 65 years of age or older. For every 100 females, there were 96.3 males.

The per capita income for the neighborhood was $14,489. About 17% of the population were below the poverty line. Of those, 28% are under age 18.

== See also ==
- Neighborhoods in Tampa, Florida
