= Courier City-Oscawana =

- Neighborhood
- Location within the state of Florida
- Coordinates: 27°56′48″N 82°27′33″W
- Country: United States
- State: Florida
- County: Hillsborough
- City: Tampa

Population (2000)
  - Total: 1,531
- Time zone: UTC-5 (Eastern (EST))
  - Summer (DST): UTC-4 (EDT)
- ZIP codes: 33606 and 33609

Courier City-Oscawana is a neighborhood within the city limits of Tampa, Florida, United States. As of the 2000 census the neighborhood had a population of 1,531. The ZIP Codes serving the neighborhood are 33606 and 33609.

== Geography ==
Courier City-Oscawana boundaries are John F. Kennedy Boulevard to the north, Armenia Avenue to the west, Swann Avenue to the South, and Rome Avenue to the east.

== Demographics ==
Source: Hillsborough County Atlas

At the 2000 census there were 1,531 people and 1,038 households residing in the neighborhood. The population density was 6,137/mi^{2}. The racial makeup of the neighborhood was 89% White, 5% African American, 0% Native American, 2% Asian, 9% from other races, and 6% from two or more races. Hispanic or Latino of any race were 26%.

Of the 1,038 households 5% had children under the age of 18 living with them, 17% were married couples living together, 28% had a female householder with no husband present, and 20% were non-families. 61% of households were made up of individuals.

The age distribution was 4% under the age of 18, 58% from 18 to 34, 23% from 35 to 49, 9% from 50 to 64, and 6% 65 or older. For every 100 females, there were 132.6 males.

The per capita income for the neighborhood was $42,024. About 10% of the population were below the poverty line.

== See also ==
- Neighborhoods in Tampa, Florida
