= Oakford Park =

- Neighborhood
- Location within the state of Florida
- Coordinates: 27°56′54″N 82°30′1″W
- Country: United States
- State: Florida
- County: Hillsborough
- City: Tampa

Population (2010)
  - Total: 1,473
- Time zone: UTC-5 (Eastern (EST))
  - Summer (DST): UTC-4 (EDT)
- ZIP codes: 33607 and 33609

Oakford Park is a neighborhood within the city limits of Tampa, Florida. As of the 2010 census the neighborhood had a population of 1,473. The ZIP Codes serving the neighborhood are 33607 and 33609. The neighborhood is home to the WTVT-Channel 13 studios.

== Geography ==
Oakford Park boundaries are Kennedy Boulevard to the south, the MacDill Avenue to the east, Dale Mabry Highway to the west, and Cypress Street to the north.

== Demographics ==
Source: Hillsborough County Atlas

At the 2010 census there were 1,473 people and 610 households residing in the neighborhood. The population density was 4,090/mi^{2}. The racial makeup of the neighborhood was 78% White, 10% African American, 0% Native American, 0% Asian, 6% from other races, and 3% from two or more races. Hispanic or Latino of any race were 48%.

Of the 610 households 21% had children under the age of 18 living with them, 37% were married couples living together, 15% had a female householder with no husband present, and 10% were non-families. 30% of households were made up of individuals.

The age distribution was 17% under the age of 18, 19% from 18 to 34, 23% from 35 to 49, 20% from 50 to 64, and 22% 65 or older. For every 100 females, there were 92.5 males.

The per capita income for the neighborhood was $20,430. About 17% of the population were below the poverty line, 22% of those are under the age of 18.

== See also ==
- Neighborhoods in Tampa, Florida
