= Riverbend (Tampa) =

- Neighborhood
- Location within the state of Florida
- Coordinates: 28°0′25″N 82°28′5″W
- Country: United States
- State: Florida
- County: Hillsborough
- City: Tampa

Population (2000)
  - Total: 1,980
- Time zone: UTC-5 (Eastern (EST))
  - Summer (DST): UTC-4 (EDT)
- ZIP codes: 33603 and 33604

Riverbend is a neighborhood within the city limits of Tampa, Florida. As of the 2000 census the neighborhood had a population of 1,980. The ZIP Codes serving the neighborhood are 33603 and 33604.

== Geography ==
Riverbend boundaries are Hillsborough Avenue to the south, the Lowry Park District to the north, Hillsborough River to the east, and the Rome Avenue to the west.

== Demographics ==
Source: Hillsborough County Atlas

As of the census of 2000, there were 1,980 people and 855 households residing in the neighborhood. The population density was 4,555/mi^{2}. The racial makeup of the neighborhood was 82% White, 9% African American, 1% Native American, less than 1% Asian, 6% from other races, and 2% from two or more races. Hispanic or Latino of any race were 34% of the population.

There were 855 households, out of which 30% had children under the age of 18 living with them, 36% were married couples living together, 18% had a female householder with no husband present, and 8% were non-families. 33% of all households were made up of individuals.

In the neighborhood the population was spread out, with 26% under the age of 18, 20% from 18 to 34, 24% from 35 to 49, 17% from 50 to 64, and 16% who were 65 years of age or older. For every 100 females, there were 103.3 males.

The per capita income for the neighborhood was $16,050. About 17% of the population were below the poverty line, 40% of those were under the age of 18.

== See also ==
- Neighborhoods in Tampa, Florida
