= Historic Hyde Park North =

Historic Hyde Park
- Neighborhood
- Location within the state of Florida
- Coordinates: 27°56′3″N 82°28′44″W
- Country: United States
- State: Florida
- County: Hillsborough
- City: Tampa

Population (2010)
  - Total: 2,689
- Time zone: UTC-5 (Eastern (EST))
  - Summer (DST): UTC-4 (EDT)
- ZIP Codes: 33606

Historic Hyde Park North is a neighborhood within the Hyde Park district of the city of Tampa, Florida. As of the 2010 census the neighborhood had a population of 2,689. The latest estimated population given was 2,447. The ZIP Code serving the neighborhood is 33606.

== Geography ==
Historic Hyde Park North boundaries are roughly the Lee Roy Selmon Expressway to the northwest and north, Bayshore Boulevard to the southeast, Swann Avenue to the south, and South Boulevard/Rome Avenue to the east.

== Demographics ==
Source: Hillsborough County Atlas

At the 2010 census there were 2,689 people and 1,493 households residing in the neighborhood. The population density was 6,769/mi^{2}. The racial makeup of the neighborhood was 92% White, 2% African American, less than 1% Native American, 3% Asian, 1% from other races, and 2% from two or more races. Hispanic or Latino of any race were 8%.

Of the 1,493 households 15% had children under the age of 18 living with them, 28% were married couples living together, 4% had a female householder with no husband present, and 14% were non-families. 51% of households were made up of individuals.

The age distribution was 15% under the age of 18, 32% from 18 to 34, 27% from 35 to 49, 19% from 50 to 64, and 7% 65 or older. For every 100 females, there were 92.8 males.

The per capita income for the neighborhood was $46,164. About 5% of the population were below the poverty line, 2% of those are under the age of 18.

== Education ==
Historic Hyde Park North is served by Hillsborough County Public Schools, which serves the city of Tampa and Hillsborough County.

== See also ==
- Neighborhoods in Tampa, Florida
- Hyde Park
