= West Riverfront =

- Neighborhood
- Location within the state of Florida
- Coordinates: 27°57′11″N 82°28′20″W
- Country: United States
- State: Florida
- County: Hillsborough
- City: Tampa

Population (2000)
  - Total: 1,345
- Time zone: UTC-5 (Eastern (EST))
  - Summer (DST): UTC-4 (EDT)
- ZIP codes: 33606 and 33607
- Area code: 813

West Riverfront is a neighborhood within the city limits of Tampa, Florida. United States. As of the 2000 census the neighborhood had a population of 1,345. The ZIP Codes serving the neighborhood are 33606 and 33607.

== Geography ==
West Riverfront boundaries are Cass Street to the south, North Boulevard to the east, Rome Avenue to the west, and Interstate 275 to the north.

== Demographics ==
As of the census of 2000, there were 1,345 people and 542 households residing in the neighborhood. The population density was 6,375/mi^{2}. The racial makeup of the neighborhood was 2% White, 96% African American, 1% Native American, 0% Asian, 0% from other races, and 2% from two or more races. Hispanic or Latino of any race were 2% of the population.

There were 542 households, out of which 32% had children under the age of 18 living with them, 16% were married couples living together, 28% had a female householder with no husband present, and 7% were non-families. 42% of all households were made up of individuals.

In the neighborhood the population was spread out, with 35% under the age of 18, 17% from 18 to 34, 25% from 35 to 49, 7% from 50 to 64, and 17% who were 65 years of age or older. For every 100 females, there were 85.8 males.

The per capita income for the neighborhood was $11,624. About 29% of the population were below the poverty line, 36% of those are under the age of 18.

== See also ==
- Neighborhoods in Tampa, Florida
