= Carver City-Lincoln Gardens =

Neighborhood in Hillsborough, Florida, United States

- Neighborhood
- Location within the state of Florida
- Coordinates: 27°57′22″N 82°30′58″W
- Country: United States
- State: Florida
- County: Hillsborough
- City: Tampa

Population (2010)
  - Total: 2,204
- Time zone: UTC-5 (Eastern (EST))
  - Summer (DST): UTC-4 (EDT)
- ZIP codes: 33607 and 33609
- Area code: 813

Carver City-Lincoln Gardens is a neighborhood within the city limits of Tampa, Florida. As of the 2010 census the neighborhood had a population of 2,204. The ZIP Codes serving the neighborhood are 33607 and 33609.

== Geography ==
Carver City-Lincoln Gardens boundaries are Tampa International Airport to the north, West Shore Blvd. to the west, Cypress Street to the south, Interstate 275 to the southeast, and Dale Mabry Highway to the east.

== History ==
Carver City was developed as a Black suburb between 1956 and 1962 on what was then considered worthless land .

== Demographics ==
Source: Hillsborough County Atlas

At the 2010 census there were 2,204 people and 1,047 households residing in the neighborhood. The population density was 2,546/mi^{2}. The racial makeup of the neighborhood was 32% White, 62% African American, 0% Native American, 2% Asian, 2% from other races and 2% from two or more races. Hispanic or Latino of any race were 12%.

Of the 1,047 households 19% had children under the age of 18 living with them, 22% were married couples living together, 19% had a female householder with no husband present, and 8% were non-families. 46% of households were made up of individuals.

The age distribution was 17% under the age of 18, 33% from 18 to 34, 18% from 35 to 49, 16% from 50 to 64, and 16% 65 or older. For every 100 females, there were 88.1 males.

The per capita income for the neighborhood was $13,429. About 16% of the population were below the poverty line, including 41.0% of those under age 18 and 16.0% of those age 65 or over.

== See also ==
- Neighborhoods in Tampa, Florida
