= Parkland Estates =

- Neighborhood
- Location within the state of Florida
- Coordinates: 27°56′10″N 82°29′27″W
- Country: United States
- State: Florida
- County: Hillsborough
- City: Tampa

Population (2000)
  - Total: 1,040
- Time zone: UTC-5 (Eastern (EST))
  - Summer (DST): UTC-4 (EDT)
- ZIP codes: 33609

Parkland Estates is a neighborhood within the city limits of Tampa, Florida. As of the 2000 census, the neighborhood had a population of 1,040. The ZIP Code serving the neighborhood is 33609.

== Geography ==
Parkland Estates boundaries are Swann Avenue to the north, Morrison Avenue to the south, Lincoln Avenue to the west, and Howard Avenue to the east. See map

== Demographics ==
Source: Hillsborough County Atlas

As of the census of 2000, 1,040 people and 480 households reside in the neighborhood. The population density was 4,691/mi^{2}. The racial makeup of the neighborhood was 89% White, 1% African American, 0% Native American, 4% Asian, 4% from other races, and 2% from two or more races. Hispanic or Latino of any race were 6% of the population.

There were 328 households, of which 24% had children under 18 living with them, 52% were married couples living together, 1% had a female householder with no husband present, and 8% were non-families. 38% of all households were made up of individuals.

In the neighborhood, the population was spread out, with 22% under 18, 13% from 18 to 34, 29% from 35 to 49, 22% from 50 to 64, and 15% who were 65 years of age or older. For every 100 females, there were 105.5 males.

The per capita income for the neighborhood was $58,270. About 2% of the population was below the poverty line, and none were under 18.

== History ==
Parkland Estates was developed by Allen J. Simms. A Street in the community bears his name.

== See also ==
- Neighborhoods in Tampa, Florida
