= Northview Hills =

- Neighborhood
- Location within the state of Florida
- Coordinates: 27°59′22″N 82°24′32″W
- Country: United States
- State: Florida
- County: Hillsborough
- City: Tampa

Population (2010)
  - Total: 938
- Time zone: UTC-5 (Eastern (EST))
  - Summer (DST): UTC-4 (EDT)
- ZIP codes: 33610

Northview Hills is a neighborhood within the city limits of Tampa, Florida. As of the 2010 census the neighborhood had a population of 938. The ZIP Code serving the neighborhood is 33610.

== Geography ==
Nothview Hills boundaries are Ellicott Street to the north, Chelsea Street to the south, East Tampa (neighborhood) to the west, and East Lake-Orient Park to the east.

== Demographics ==
Source: Hillsborough County Atlas

As of the census of 2010, there were 938 people and 341 households residing in the neighborhood. The population density was 3,335/mi^{2}. The racial makeup of the neighborhood was 19% White, 74% African American, 1% Native American, 0% Asian, 4% from other races, and 2% from two or more races. Hispanic or Latino of any race were 12% of the population.

There were 341 households, out of which 21% had children under the age of 18 living with them, 23% were married couples living together, 36% had a female householder with no husband present, and 8% were non-families. 25% of all households were made up of individuals.

In the neighborhood the population was spread out, with 30% under the age of 18, 24% from 18 to 34, 18% from 35 to 49, 15% from 50 to 64, and 14% who were 65 years of age or older. For every 100 females, there were 91.2 males.

The per capita income for the neighborhood was $13,757. About 25% of the population were below the poverty line, 47% of those are under the age of 18.

== See also ==
- Neighborhoods in Tampa, Florida
