= East Ybor =

- Neighborhood
- Location within the state of Florida
- Coordinates: 27°57′45″N 82°25′49″W
- Country: United States
- State: Florida
- County: Hillsborough
- City: Tampa

Population (2010)
  - Total: 536
- Time zone: UTC-5 (Eastern (EST))
  - Summer (DST): UTC-4 (EDT)
- ZIP codes: 33605

East Ybor is a neighborhood within the city limits of Tampa, Florida. As of the 2010 census the neighborhood had a population of 536. The ZIP Codes serving the neighborhood is 33605. The neighborhood is located just east of the historic Ybor City.

== Geography ==
East Ybor boundaries are Adamo Drive to the south, Interstate 4 to the north, 39th Street to the east and Ybor City to the west.

== Demographics ==
At the 2010 census there were 536 people and 220 households residing in the neighborhood. The population density was 1,913/mi^{2}. The racial makeup of the neighborhood was 33% White, 62% African American, 0% Native American, 1% Asian, 1% from other races, and 2% from two or more races. Hispanic or Latino of any race were 12%.

Of the 220 households 21% had children under the age of 18 living with them, 19% were married couples living together, 18% had a female householder with no husband present, and 15% were non-families. 39% of households were made up of individuals.

The age distribution was 20% under the age of 18, 24% from 18 to 34, 22% from 35 to 49, 22% from 50 to 64, and 15% 65 or older. For every 100 females, there were 123.3 males.

The per capita income for the neighborhood was $9,905. About 26% of the population were below the poverty line, 34% of those are under the age of 18.

== See also ==
- Neighborhoods in Tampa, Florida
