= Old West Tampa =

- Neighborhood
- Location within the state of Florida
- Coordinates: 27°57′42″N 82°28′58″W
- Country: United States
- State: Florida
- County: Hillsborough
- City: Tampa

Population (2010)
  - Total: 2,014
- Time zone: UTC-5 (Eastern (EST))
  - Summer (DST): UTC-4 (EDT)
- ZIP codes: 33607

Old West Tampa is a neighborhood within the city limits of Tampa, Florida. As of the 2010 census, the neighborhood had a population of 2,014. The ZIP code serving the neighborhood is 33607. The neighborhood is located in the heart of the West Tampa district.

== Geography ==
Old West Tampa boundaries are Saint Joseph Street to the north, Interstate 275 to the south, Rome Avenue to the east and Armenia Avenue to the west.

== Demographics ==
At the 2010 census there were 2,014 people and 715 households residing in the neighborhood. The population density was 5,779/mi^{2}. The racial makeup of the neighborhood was 26% White, 64% African American, 1% Native American, 1% Asian, and 4% from two or more races. Hispanic or Latino of any race were 28%.

Of the 715 households 24% had children under the age of 18 living with them, 22% were married couples living together, 33% had a female householder with no husband present, and 10% were non-families. 26% of households were made up of individuals.

The age distribution was 25% under the age of 18, 23% from 18 to 34, 21% from 35 to 49, 18% from 50 to 64, and 13% 65 or older. For every 100 females, there were 99.4 males.

The per capita income for the neighborhood was $11,640. About 30% of the population were below the poverty line, 49% of those are under the age of 18.

== See also ==
- West Tampa District
- Neighborhoods in Tampa, Florida
