= Virginia Park (Tampa) =

- Neighborhood
- Location within the state of Florida
- Coordinates: 27°55′9″N 82°30′15″W
- Country: United States
- State: Florida
- County: Hillsborough
- City: Tampa

Population (2000)
  - Total: 4,378
- Time zone: UTC-5 (Eastern (EST))
  - Summer (DST): UTC-4 (EDT)

Virginia Park is a neighborhood within the city limits of Tampa, Florida. As of the 2000 census the neighborhood had a population of 4,378. The ZIP Codes serving the area are 33611 and 33629.

== Geography ==
Virginia Park boundaries are Dale Mabry Highway/Himes Ave. to the east, Manhattan Avenue to the west, Euclid Avenue to the south, and Palmira Avenue/Bay to Bay Boulevard to the north.

== Demographics ==
Source: Hillsborough County Atlas

At the 2000 census there were 4,378 people and 1,906 households residing in the neighborhood. The population density was 4,941/mi^{2}. The racial makeup of the neighborhood was 94.0% White, 1.0% African American, 0.0% Native American, 2.0% Asian, 1.0% from other races, and 2.0% from two or more races. Hispanic or Latino of any race were about 9.0%.

Of the 1,906 households 27% had children under the age of 18 living with them, 50% were married couples living together, 10% had a female householder with no husband present, and 8% non-families. 29% of households were made up of individuals.

The age distribution was 22% under the age of 18, 22% from 18 to 34, 29% from 35 to 49, 13% from 50 to 64, and 14% 65 or older. For every 100 females, there were 89.7 males.

The per capita income for the neighborhood was $35,978. About 4% of the population were below the poverty line. Of those, 53% are under the age of 18.

== See also ==
- Neighborhoods in Tampa, Florida
