= Sunset Park (Tampa) =

- Neighborhood
- Location within the state of Florida
- Coordinates: 27°55′8″N 82°31′23″W
- Country: United States
- State: Florida
- County: Hillsborough
- City: Tampa

Population (2000)
  - Total: 3,520
- Time zone: UTC-5 (Eastern (EST))
  - Summer (DST): UTC-4 (EDT)
- ZIP codes: 33629

Sunset Park is a neighborhood within the city limits of Tampa, Florida. As of the 2000 census the neighborhood had a population of 3,520. The ZIP Code serving the neighborhood is 33629.

== Geography ==
Sunset Park boundaries are Beach Park Isles to the north, Culbreath Heights to the northeast, El Prado to the south, Tampa Bay to the west, and Manhattan Avenue to the east.

== Demographics ==
Source: Hillsborough County Atlas

At the 2000 census there were 3,520 people and 1,309 households residing in the neighborhood. The population density was 4,457/mi^{2}. The racial makeup of the neighborhood was 98% White, less than 1% African American, 0% Native American, 5% Asian, 0% from other races, and 0% from two or more races. Hispanic or Latino of any race were 7%.

Of the 1,309 households 41% had children under the age of 18 living with them, 71% were married couples living together, 7% had a female householder with no husband present, and 2% were non-families. 18% of households were made up of individuals.

The age distribution was 31% under the age of 18, 10% from 18 to 34, 29% from 35 to 49, 18% from 50 to 64, and 14% 65 or older. For every 100 females, there were 92.3 males.

The per capita income for the neighborhood was $56,893. About 2% of the population were below the poverty line, 29% of those under age 18.

== See also ==
- Neighborhoods in Tampa, Florida
