= Forest Hills (Tampa) =

- Neighborhood
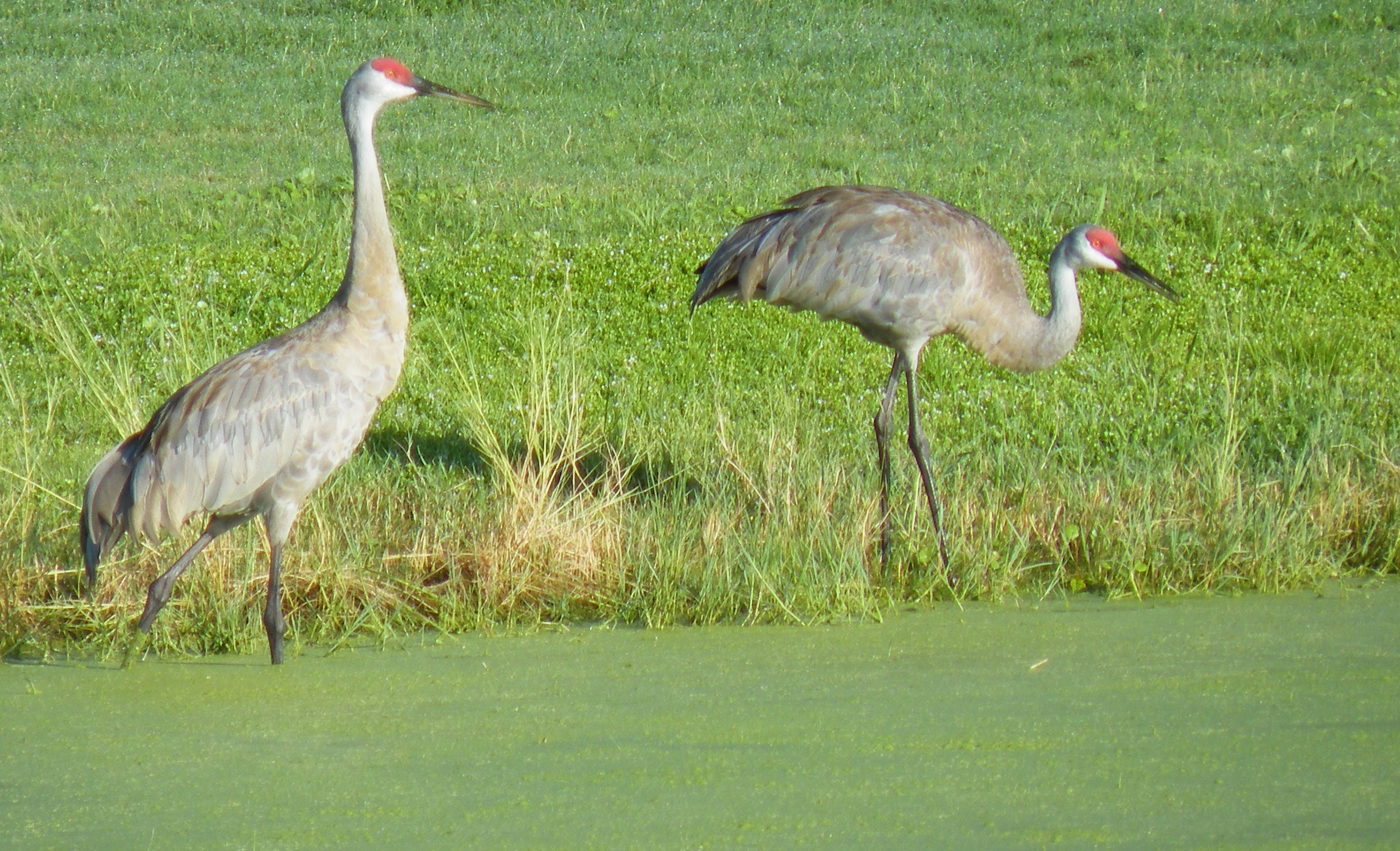

- Location within the state of Florida
- Coordinates: 28°2′36″N 82°28′20″W
- Country: United States
- State: Florida
- County: Hillsborough
- City: Tampa
- Time zone: UTC-5 (Eastern (EST))
  - Summer (DST): UTC-4 (EDT)
- ZIP codes: 33612

Forest Hills is a neighborhood partially within the city limits of Tampa, Florida, United States, with the northern portion located in unincorporated Hillsborough County near Lake Magdalene. In 1926 a golf course and club house was built there. In 1949, "Babe" Zaharias bought the clubhouse and golf course, and may have lived in the clubhouse for a time. She moved to a house nearby in 1954. In 1956, she died of cancer in Galveston, Texas and the course closed.

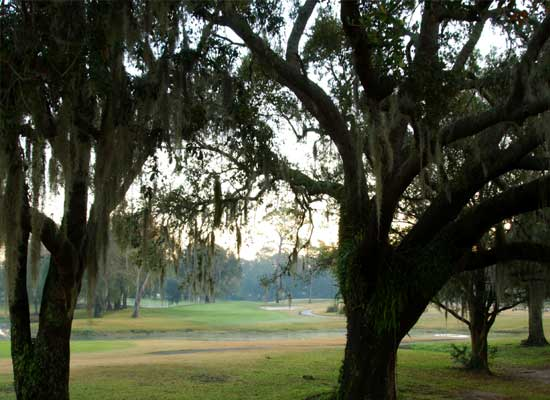
Babe Zaharias Golf Course

The area was mainly a citrus grove until residential development began in the 1950s and 1960s. A developer from Miami wanted to buy the golf course land, but the City of Tampa decided to buy it and restore it. In 1974 the course was reopened. Since then it has been renovated, the courses were rebuilt and an irrigation system added.

In recent years, some of the older, smaller homes in Forest Hills have been replaced by bigger homes of larger square footages. This has been particularly the case with properties located around the lakes and ponds in Forest Hills located west of North Boulevard and north of Country Club Drive. The area, essentially close-in suburb of Tampa city proper, remains popular with both new arrivals to the Tampa area and native Tampanians alike.

Forest Hills still contains the golf course named after Babe Zaharias, a public golf course owned by City of Tampa. The neighborhood has its branch post office with a ZIP Code of 33612. The population was 4,734 at the 2000 census.

The neighborhood was designed in 1926 along with the golf course (originally called "Golfland Country Club") and remains to this day largely as designed back then.

== Education ==
The schools serving this area are as follows:

- Forest Hills Elementary
- Lake Magdalene Elementary
- Adams Middle School
- Chamberlain High School
