= Terrace Park (Tampa) =

- Neighborhood
- Location within the state of Florida
- Coordinates: 28°2′24″N 82°24′58″W
- Country: United States
- State: Florida
- County: Hillsborough
- City: Tampa

Population (2000)
  - Total: 7,579
- Time zone: UTC-5 (Eastern (EST))
  - Summer (DST): UTC-4 (EDT)
- ZIP codes: 33612 and 33617

Terrace Park is a neighborhood within the city limits of Tampa, Florida, United States. As of the 2000 census the neighborhood had a population of 7,579. The ZIP Codes serving the neighborhood are 33612 and 33617. It is divided into 2 census tracts: 1.02 and 1.01, the first being southern Terrace Park and the other being northern.

== Geography ==
Terrace Park boundaries are the University of South Florida to the north, 30th Street to the west, Busch Blvd. to the south, and Temple Terrace to the east.

== Demographics ==
Source: https://mtgis-portal.geo.census.gov/arcgis/apps/MapSeries/index.html?appid=2566121a73de463995ed2b2fd7ff6eb7 https://www.opportunityatlas.org/

- based on census tract 1.02

At the 2020 census there were 5,616 people and 2,325 households residing in the neighborhood. The population density was 4,325/mi^{2}. The racial makeup of the city was 20.3% White, 38.4% African American, 0.4% Native American, 3.1% Asian, 11.2% from other races, and 15.5% from two or more races. Hispanic or Latino of any race were 32%. https://mtgis-portal.geo.census.gov/arcgis/apps/MapSeries/index.html?appid=2566121a73de463995ed2b2fd7ff6eb7 Of the 2,325 households 30% had children under the age of 18 living with them, 27% were married couples living together, 19% had a female householder with no husband present, and 10% were non-families. 37% of households were made up of individuals.

The age distribution was 27% under the age of 18, 30% from 18 to 34, 22% from 35 to 49, 12% from 50 to 64, and 9% 65 or older. For every 100 females, there were 87.0 males.

The per capita income for the neighborhood was $20,000. About 39% of the population were below the poverty line, including 30.0% of those under age 18 and 12.0% of those age 65 or over.

- based on census tract 1.01

At the 2020 census there were 5,208 people and 1,774 households residing in the neighborhood. The population density was 4,043/mi^{2}. The racial makeup of the city was 52.6% White, 20.4% African American, 0.4% Native American, 7.2% Asian, 8.9% from other races, and 10.3% from two or more races. Hispanic or Latino of any race were 20.7%. Of the 1,774 households 30% had children under the age of 18 living with them, 19.7% were married couples living together, 19% had a female householder with no husband present, and 10% were non-families. 37% of households were made up of individuals.

The age distribution was 27% under the age of 18, 30% from 18 to 34, 22% from 35 to 49, 12% from 50 to 64, and 9% 65 or older. For every 100 females, there were 87.0 males.

The per capita income for the neighborhood was $28,000. About 37% of the population were below the poverty line, including 30.0% of those under age 18 and 12.0% of those age 65 or over.

== Attractions ==
Terrace Park is home to the Museum Of Science and Industry, which is located on the northern part of the neighborhood, Busch Gardens, and Adventure Island. Just to the northwest of the district is University Mall.

== See also ==
- Neighborhoods in Tampa, Florida
