= Gandy-Sun Bay South =

Gandy/Sun Bay South
- Neighborhood
- Nickname: SOG
- Location within the state of Florida
- Coordinates: 27°53′2″N 82°30′52″W
- Country: United States
- State: Florida
- County: Hillsborough
- City: Tampa

Population (2010)
  - Total: 14,912
- Time zone: UTC-5 (Eastern (EST))
  - Summer (DST): UTC-4 (EDT)
- ZIP codes: 33611 and 33616

Gandy/Sun Bay South is a neighborhood within the city limits of Tampa, Florida. As of the 2010 census, the neighborhood had a population of 14,912. The ZIP Codes serving the area are 33611 and 33616.

== Geography ==
Gandy/Sun Bay South boundaries are Gandy Boulevard to the north, Tampa Bay to the west, Interbay Boulevard/Everett Avenue/Tampa Bay to the south, and MacDill Avenue to the east. The neighborhood is part of the South Tampa district.

== Demographics ==
As of the 2010 census, there were 14,912 people and 6,759 households residing in the neighborhood. The population density was 4,261/mi^{2}. The racial makeup of the neighborhood was 76% White, 10% African American, 1% Native American, 5% Asian, 3% from other races, and 4% from two or more races. Hispanic or Latino of any race were about 17% of the population.

There were 6,759 households, out of which 22% had children under the age of 18 living with them, 33% were married couples living together, 15% had a female householder with no husband present, and 11% were non-families. 36% of all households were made up of individuals.

In the neighborhood the population was spread out, with 19% under the age of 18, 28% from 18 to 34, 23% from 35 to 49, 18% from 50 to 64, and 11% who were 65 years of age or older. For every 100 females, there were 102.8 males.

The per capita income for the neighborhood was $19,502. About 14% of the population were below the poverty line. Of those, 38% are under age 18.

== Education ==
- Thomas Richard Robinson High School
- Monroe Middle School
- Lanier Elementary School
- Chiaramonte Elementary School
- Westshore Elementary School in Port Tampa

== See also ==
- Neighborhoods in Tampa, Florida
