= Bayshore Gardens (Tampa) =

- Neighborhood
- Location within the state of Florida
- Coordinates: 27°55′33″N 82°29′10″W
- Country: United States
- State: Florida
- County: Hillsborough
- City: Tampa

Population (2010)
  - Total: 1,760
- Time zone: UTC-5 (Eastern (EST))
  - Summer (DST): UTC-4 (EDT)
- ZIP codes: 33606 and 33629
- Area code: 813

Bayshore Gardens is a neighborhood within the city limits of Tampa, Florida. As of the 2010 census, the neighborhood had a population of 1,760. The ZIP Codes serving the area are 33606 and 33629.

== Geography ==
Bayshore Gardens boundaries are Howard Avenue to the northeast, Lee Roy Selmon Expressway to the west, Bay to Bay Boulevard to the south, and Bayshore Boulevard to the southeast.

== Demographics ==
Source: Hillsborough County Atlas

At the 2010 census, there were 1,760 people and 1,227 households residing in the neighborhood. The population density was 9,153/mi^{2}. The racial makeup of the neighborhood was 93.0% White, 2.0% African American,0.0% Native American, 2.0% Asian, 1.0% from other races, and 2.0% from two or more races. Hispanic or Latino of any race were about 10.0%.

Of the 1,227 households: 3% had children under the age of 18 living with them, 21% were married couples living together, 3% had a female householder with no husband present, and 6% non-families. 66% of households were made up of individuals.

The age distribution was 6% under the age of 18, 29% from 18 to 34, 17% from 35 to 49, 19% from 50 to 64, and 31% 65 or older. For every 100 females, there were 80.0 males.

The per capita income for the neighborhood was $46,457. About 8% of the population were below the poverty line. Of those, none are the under age 18.

== See also ==
- Neighborhoods in Tampa, Florida
