= Palma Ceia West =

- Neighborhood
- Location within the state of Florida
- Coordinates: 27°55′42″N 82°30′51″W
- Country: United States
- State: Florida
- County: Hillsborough
- City: Tampa

Population (2000)
  - Total: 2,531
- Time zone: UTC-5 (Eastern (EST))
  - Summer (DST): UTC-4 (EDT)
- ZIP codes: 33609 and 33629

Palma Ceia West is a neighborhood within the city limits of Tampa, Florida, located just west of Palma Ceia. As of the 2000 census the neighborhood had a population of 2,531. The ZIP Codes serving the neighborhood are 33609 and 33629. The neighborhood is part of the South Tampa District.

== Geography ==
Palma Ceia West boundaries are San Obispo to the south, Morrison Avenue to the north, Dale Mabry Highway to the east and Lois Avenue to the west.

== Demographics ==
Source: Hillsborough County Atlas

As of the census of 2000, there were 2,531 people and 1,127 households residing in the neighborhood. The population density was 3,929/mi^{2}. The racial makeup of the neighborhood was 96% White, 1% African American, 0% Native American, less than 1% Asian or Pacific Islander, less than 1% from other races, and 2% from two or more races. Hispanic or Latino of any race were 8% of the population.

There were 1,127 households, out of which 32% had children under the age of 18 living with them, 50% were married couples living together, 10% had a female householder with no husband present, and 7% were non-families. 32% of all households were made up of individuals.

In the neighborhood the population was spread out, with 24% under the age of 18, 19% from 18 to 34, 29% from 35 to 49, 16% from 50 to 64, and 13% who were 65 years of age or older. For every 100 females, there were 93.1 males.

The per capita income for the neighborhood was $34,830. About 2% of the population were below the poverty line, 10% of those were under the age of 18.

== See also ==
- Neighborhoods in Tampa, Florida
