= University Square (Tampa) =

- Neighborhood
- Location within the state of Florida
- Coordinates: 28°2′57″N 82°26′10″W
- Country: United States
- State: Florida
- County: Hillsborough
- City: Tampa

Population (2000)
  - Total: 7,456
- Time zone: UTC-5 (Eastern (EST))
  - Summer (DST): UTC-4 (EDT)
- ZIP code: 33612
- Area code: 813

University Square is a neighborhood within the city limits of Tampa, Florida. As of the 2000 census the neighborhood had a population of 7,456. The ZIP Code serving the neighborhood is 33612. The neighborhood is close to many attractions and the University of South Florida.

== Geography ==
University Square boundaries are the unincorporated community of University to the north, 30th Street to the east, Linebaugh Avenue to the south, and 15th Street to the west.

== Demographics ==
Source: Hillsborough County Atlas

At the 2000 census there were 7,456 people and 2,802 households residing in the neighborhood. The population density was 7,285/mi^{2}. The racial makeup of the neighborhood was 51.0% White, 34.0% African American, 0.0% Native American, 2.0% Asian, less than 6.0% from other races, and 6.0% from two or more races. Hispanic or Latino of any race were 23.0%.

Of the 2,802 households 36% had children under the age of 18 living with them, 35% were married couples living together, 22% had a female householder with no husband present, and 8% were non-families. 28% of households were made up of individuals.

The age distribution was 29% under the age of 18, 30% from 18 to 34, 21% from 35 to 49, 11% from 50 to 64, and 9% 65 or older. For every 100 females, there were 97.2 males.

The per capita income for the neighborhood was $13,986. About 19.0% of the population were below the poverty line, including 40.0% of those under age 18 and 7.0% of those age 65 or over.

== See also ==
- Neighborhoods in Tampa, Florida
