= Beach Park Isles =

- Neighborhood
- Location within the state of Florida
- Coordinates: 27°56′1″N 82°31′47″W
- Country: United States
- State: Florida
- County: Hillsborough
- City: Tampa

Population (2010)
  - Total: 171
- Time zone: UTC-5 (Eastern (EST))
  - Summer (DST): UTC-4 (EDT)
- ZIP codes: 33609 and 33629
- Area code: 813

Beach Park Isles is a neighborhood within the city limits of Tampa, Florida. As of the 2010 census the neighborhood had a population of 171. The ZIP codes serving the neighborhood are 33609 and 33629.

== Geography ==
Beach Park Isles boundaries are Tampa Bay to the west, south, and north; Bay Way Drive to the east.

== Demographics ==
Source: Hillsborough Community Atlas

At the 2010 census there were 171 people and 59 households residing in the neighborhood. The population density was 4,195/mi^{2}. The racial makeup of the neighborhood was 98% White, 1% African American, 0% Native American, 0% Asian, 0% from other races, and 1% from two or more races. Hispanic or Latino of any race were 11%.

Of the 59 households 39% had children under the age of 18 living with them, 79% were married couples living together, 5% had a female householder with no husband present, and 2% were non-families. 12% of households were made up of individuals.

The age distribution was 30% under the age of 18, 7% from 18 to 34, 20% from 35 to 49, 26% from 50 to 64, and 27% 65 or older. For every 100 females, there were 106 males.

The per capita income for the neighborhood was $76,222. About 1% of the population were below the poverty line, 0% of those under age 18 and 60% of those age 65 or over.

== See also ==
- Neighborhoods in Tampa, Florida
