= North Tampa (neighborhood) =

- Neighborhood
- Location within the state of Florida
- Coordinates: 28°3′1″N 82°27′0″W
- Country: United States
- State: Florida
- County: Hillsborough
- City: Tampa

Population (2010)
  - Total: 5,585
- Time zone: UTC-5 (Eastern (EST))
  - Summer (DST): UTC-4 (EDT)
- ZIP codes: 33604 and 33612

North Tampa is a neighborhood within the city limits of Tampa, Florida. As of the 2010 census the neighborhood had a population of 5,585. The ZIP Codes neighborhood are 33604 and 33612.

== Geography ==
North Tampa boundaries are University to the north, Nebraska Avenue to the west, Sulphur Springs to the south, and University Square (neighborhood) to the east.

== Demographics ==
Source: Hillsborough County Atlas

As of the census of 2010, there were 5,585 people and 2,174 households residing in the neighborhood. The population density was 6,974/mi^{2}. The racial makeup of the neighborhood was 39% White, 50% African American, less than 1% Native American, 1% Asian, 7% from other races, and 4% from two or more races. Hispanic or Latino of any race were 28% of the population.

There were 2,174 households, out of which 28% had children under the age of 18 living with them, 20% were married couples living together, 24% had a female householder with no husband present, and 40% were non-families. 9% of all households were made up of individuals. .

In the neighborhood the population was spread out, with 28% under the age of 18, 26% from 18 to 34, 21% from 35 to 49, 17% from 50 to 64, and 8% who were 65 years of age or older. The median age was 40 years. For every 100 females, there were 110.5 males.

The per capita income for the neighborhood was $10,209. About 35% of the population were below the poverty line, including 46% of those under age 18 and 5% of those age 65 or over.

== See also ==
- Neighborhoods in Tampa, Florida
