= Uceta Yard =

- Neighborhood
- Location within the state of Florida
- Coordinates: 27°57′35″N 82°23′43″W
- Country: United States
- State: Florida
- County: Hillsborough
- City: Tampa
- Time zone: UTC-5 (Eastern (EST))
  - Summer (DST): UTC-4 (EDT)
- ZIP codes: 33619
- Area code: 813

Uceta Yard is a rail yard in a non-residential section within the city limits of Tampa. The ZIP Code serving the community is 33619.

== History ==
Uceta Yard was the primary classification yard for the Atlantic Coast Line Railroad (ACL) in central Florida. Located in Tampa, adjacent to the former Seaboard Air Line Railroad (SAL) Yeoman Yard, it was also the site of a large car and locomotive repair facility.

After the 1967 SCL merger, the yard was gradually downgraded to being a storage yard and intermodal facility for the Seaboard Coast Line Railroad, later to become CSX Transportation in the early 1980s.

== Geography ==
Uceta Yard is located nearly halfway between Downtown Tampa and suburban Brandon, on the city's easternmost edge. Its borders include Tampa city limits to the north, Tampa Bypass Canal to the east, Palm River-Clair Mel to the South and East Ybor to the west.
