= Westshore (Tampa) =

- Neighborhood
- Location within the state of Florida
- Coordinates: 27°57′17″N 82°31′27″W
- Country: United States
- State: Florida
- County: Hillsborough
- City: Tampa
- Time zone: UTC-5 (Eastern (EST))
  - Summer (DST): UTC-4 (EDT)

Westshore is a principal business district of Tampa, Florida, United States, with more than 11,000,000 square feet (1,000,000 m^{2}) of commercial office space, 4,000 businesses with nearly 100,000 employees, 32 hotels, two major shopping malls (International Plaza and WestShore Plaza) and more than 200 restaurants and bars. Westshore Boulevard is the district's main thoroughfare. Although mostly zoned for commercial use there is also some residential space in the area. The NEVs that circulate people around Tampa's urban corridor areas are starting to venture to International Plaza.

The Westshore Business District includes Tampa International Airport, the headquarters of OSI Restaurant Partners (owners of Outback Steakhouse, Carrabba's Italian Grill, and other restaurant chains), and One Buccaneer Place, and the former team headquarters of the Tampa Bay Buccaneers.

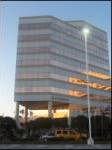
Westshore 500

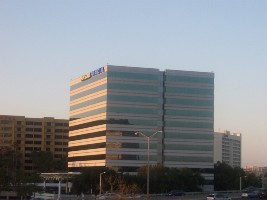
Westshore Corporate Center

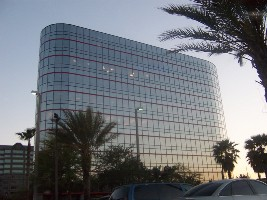
Westshore Center

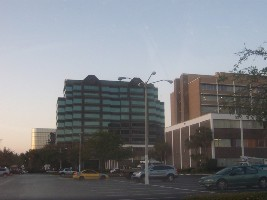
Several towers in the Westshore district

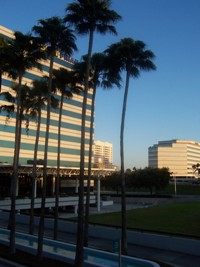
Several towers viewed from a parking garage

== See also ==
- Downtown Tampa, the main CBD of Tampa
- International Plaza and Bay Street, upscale mall and entertainment district adjacent to TPA
- Rocky Point, island neighborhood adjacent to Westshore and TPA
