= Palma Ceia =

Human settlement in Tampa, Florida, United States of America

Coordinates: 27.921°N 82.495°W

Palma Ceia is a neighborhood located southwest of downtown Tampa, Florida in South Tampa. It is bounded by Miguel Street West of MacDill Avenue and Neptune Street East of MacDill Avenue to the north; Bay to Bay Boulevard from Dale Mabry to Himes and El Prado between Himes and the Crosstown Expressway to the south; MacDill Avenue between Neptune and San Miguel, Dale Mabry Highway between San Miguel and Bay to Bay and Himes between Bay to Bay and El Prado to the west; and the Lee Roy Selmon Expressway to the east. The street names throughout Palma Ceia are of Cuban origin, coming from streets in the old section of Havana. Historians say the most likely explanation is that Angel Cuesta, president of Cuesta-Rey cigars, shared a map of Havana with developer Thomas Palmer while discussing the area.

Palma Ceia is home to the appropriately named Palma Ceia Country Club and also located adjacent to the exclusive Golfview community. The neighborhood is within the district of Henry B. Plant High School. Aesthetically it is most known for its bricked streets, akin to those in Ybor City.

The neighborhood is home to the Palma Ceia Design District, centered on the intersection of MacDill Ave. and Bay to Bay Blvd. This district contains many specialty boutiques and cafes, including some of the highest rated in the city. It is a half-mile walk from Bayshore Boulevard. A sculpture by local artist Marc DeWaele was erected at the Macdill and Bay to Bay intersection to officially designate the district. Its ribbon cutting was March 17, 2010.

== See also ==
- Bayshore Beautiful
- Davis Islands
- Hyde Park
- SoHo
