= Beach Park (Tampa) =

- Neighborhood
- Location within the state of Florida
- Coordinates: 27°56′15″N 82°31′14″W
- Country: United States
- State: Florida
- County: Hillsborough
- City: Tampa

Population (2010)
  - Total: 3,986
- Time zone: UTC-5 (Eastern (EST))
  - Summer (DST): UTC-4 (EDT)
- ZIP codes: 33609 and 33629
- Area code: 813

Beach Park is a neighborhood within the city limits of Tampa, Florida. As of the 2010 census the neighborhood had a population of 3,986. The ZIP Codes serving the neighborhood are 33609 and 33629. This region of Tampa was first settled by Col. Harry Culbreath and his family who migrated from South Carolina during the 1860s. Cultivation of oranges and the raising of cattle continued until the development of Beach Park neighborhood in the 1920s. [1] T. Roy Young, William Trice, Milton and Giddings Mabry in 1911 subdivided the land into “Beach Park on the Bay,” creating man made canals and bayous accompanied by windy roads.

== Geography ==
Beach Park boundaries are Kennedy Blvd. to the north, Beachway Drive to the south, Tampa Bay to the west, and Lois Avenue to the east.

== Demographics ==
Source: Hillsborough County Atlas

As of the census of 2010, there were 3,986 people and 1,692 households residing in the neighborhood. The population density was 4,261/mi^{2}. The racial makeup of the neighborhood was 92% White, 2% African American, 0% Native American, 4% Asian, 1% from other races, and 2% from two or more races. Hispanic or Latino of any race were 11% of the population.

There were 1,692 households, out of which 29% had children under the age of 18 living with them, 52% were married couples living together, 6% had a female householder with no husband present, and 9% were non-families. 30% of all households were made up of individuals.

In the neighborhood the population was spread out, with 24% under the age of 18, 17% from 18 to 34, 24% from 35 to 49, 22% from 50 to 64, and 15% who were 65 years of age or older. For every 100 females, there were 98.8 males.

The per capita income for the neighborhood was $48,549. About 2% of the population were below the poverty line, 0% of those under age 18 and 9% of those age 65 or over.

== See also ==
- Neighborhoods in Tampa, Florida
