= Hillsborough County Public Schools =

School district of Hillsborough County, Florida, U.S.

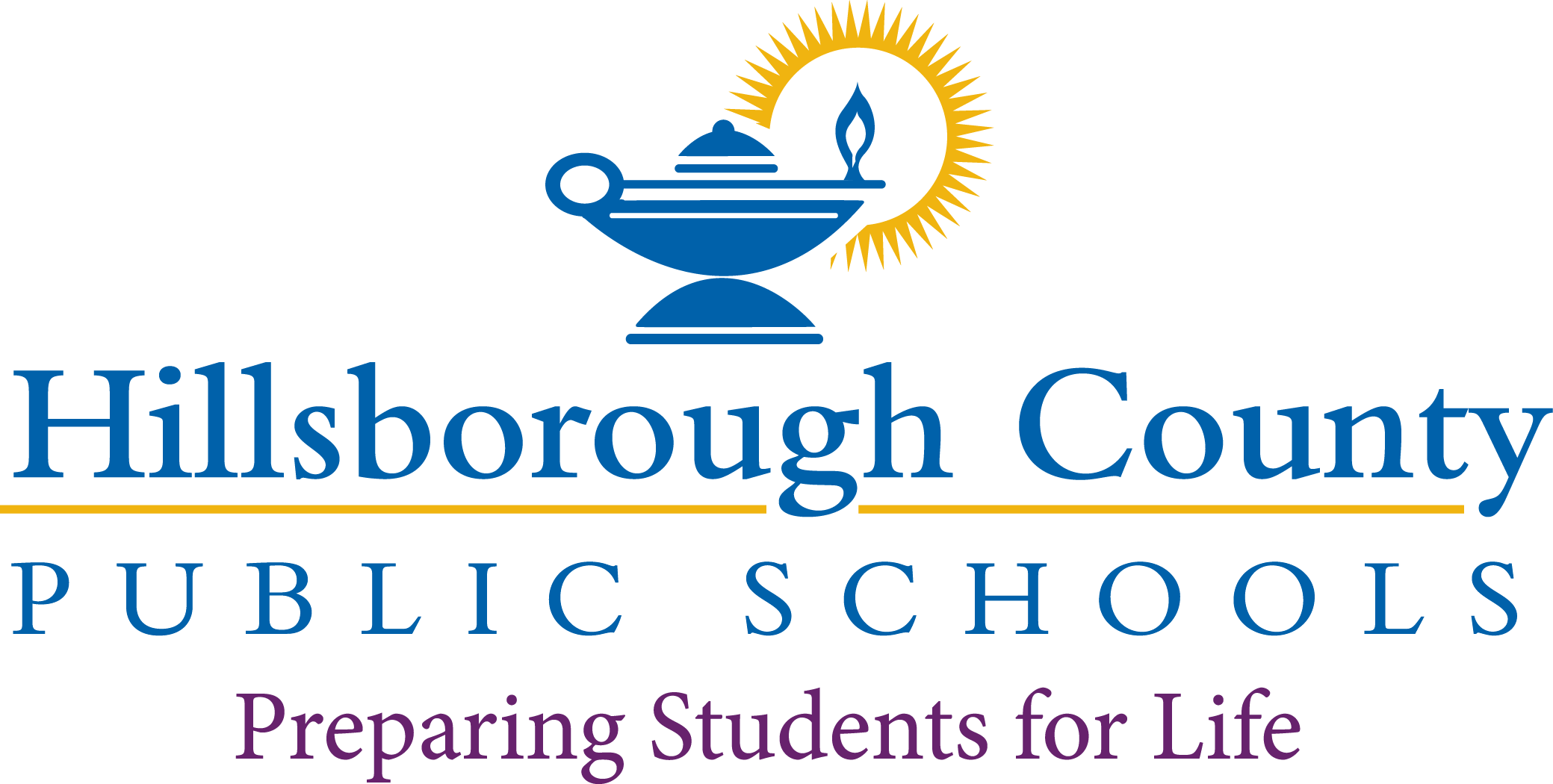

Location
- Hillsborough County Florida United States

District information
- Type: Public
- Motto: Preparing Students For Life
- Grades: Pre K-12
- Superintendent: Van Ayres
- Schools: 250
- Budget: $3.3 billion

Students and staff
- Students: 206,841
- Teachers: 15,162
- Staff: 25,170 (includes teachers)

Other information
- Employee union: Hillsborough Classroom Teachers Association (HCTA)
- Website: HillsboroughSchools.org

Hillsborough County Public Schools (HCPS) is a school district that runs the public school system of Hillsborough County in west central Florida and is headquartered in Tampa, Florida, United States. It is frequently referred to as the School District of Hillsborough County (SDHC).

The district serves all of Hillsborough County. It is the third largest school district in Florida and the 7th largest in the United States. It is governed by the School Board of Hillsborough County, which consists of seven elected members and one superintendent, who is hired by the board. The current superintendent is Van Ayres.

== History ==
In 1941, the school board discriminated against black teachers, and after the Florida State Teachers Association helped organize a lawsuit challenging the unequal pay schedule, the board responded by dropping racial categories for a rating system that scored black teachers lower than their white counterparts. In 1966, voters approved a referendum to abolish elections for the position of superintendent and adopt appointive selection by the school board.

In 2021, it had over 213,000 students, giving it the seventh highest student population of any U.S. school district.

During the COVID-19 pandemic in Florida, one week after the start of school in 2021, the district had 1,805 cases of students or employees contracting COVID-19, and as a result had to isolate or quarantine about 10,384 students and 338 employees. In 2026, voters approved a referendum to adopt elections for the position of superintendent, ending appointive selection by the school board. The first superintendent election is planned for 2028.

== Demographics ==
In the 2021–2022 academic year, the ethnic makeup of Hillsborough County Public Schools was as follows:

- 4.52% Asian
- 21.06% Black
- 36.87% Hispanic
- 0.18% Indian
- 6.27% Multi-ethnic
- 31.10% White

== School board ==
The Hillsborough County School Board consists of seven elected officials, five elected by voters in their district and two elected on a countywide basis. As of November 17, 2020, the board consists of:

- Lynn Gray – District 7
- Stacy Hahn – District 2
- Nadia Combs – District 1
- Jessica Vaughn – District 3 (Vice Chair)
- Patti Rendon – District 4
- Henry "Shake" Washington – District 5
- Karen Perez – District 6 (Chair)

The board has the authority to hire and fire the superintendent, who oversees the day-to-day operation of the school system and reports to the board. Since November 2023, the superintendent has been Van Ayres, who was previously Chief of Strategic Planning and Partnerships, and Deputy of Schools for Hillsborough County. He replaced Addison Davis, who resigned in June 2023.

School Board terms are for 4 years and elections take place every 2 years. District 1, 3, 5, and 7 elections are staggered with district 2, 4, and 6 elections. School Board members are required to live in the District for which they are running.

== 2026 School Board Election ==
The 2026 School Board Election includes District Seats 2, 4, and 6. The District 4 seat is currently held by Patricia (Patti) Rendon who ran unopposed this election cycle, so won her seat outright.

District 6 initially had 3 candidates on the primary ballot: Kenneth "Ken" Gay, Karen Perez (Incumbent), and Sally Harris "Ms. Sally" Williamson. The election is headed to a runoff, scheduled for November 3rd, 2026, as no candidate received a high enough percent of the votes to win. Kenneth "Ken" Gay received 27.23%, Keren Perez received 48.27%, and Sally Harris "Ms. Sally" Williamson received 24.50% of the votes. Candidate Williamson did not qualify for the November election. Kenneth Gay is a retired teacher and is running on his experience and understanding of how education works. Karen Perez is a licensed clinical social worker and the current School Board Chair and believes that mental health should be a focus as well as making sure students and families feel safe coming to school.

District 2 also had 3 candidates on the primary ballot: Brittany Lyssy, Daniela Simic, and Chris Taylor. This seat will also go to a runoff in the General Election as no candidate secured the needed votes to win. Brittany Lyssy received 36.84%, Daniela Simic received 38.73%, and Chris Taylor received 24.43%. Candidate Chris Taylor did not qualify for the November Election. Brittany Lyssy is an attorney who is running on fiscal responsibility and academic achievement. Daniela Simic is a lifelong educator who has also been the PTA president at her son's school. Her focus is student success, teacher retention, safety, and teacher communication. The Hillsborough County District 2 School Board race has been mired with controversy. There have been numerous sources reporting on the residency requirements of candidate Lyssy. Lyssy lists her residential address as Tampa in Hillsborough County, however her homestead tax exemption (filed by her husband) is for a property in Manatee County. In addition, her role in the Tampa Young Republicans when the organization was caught up in a controversy with the Tate Brothers has also been called into question. She denies involvement, but records show she was the CMO when that issue arose and well after. She has also taken some notably harsh stances against the LGBTQ+ community, which has led parents to question how she will advocate for and support all students. Daniela Simic has been questioned as well due to an endorsement from the Southern Poverty Law Center. Both candidates have maintained that they are focused on the election and Simic stated specifically that she's not going to attack back because she is asking voters to make her "a leader of their children" and views attacks as a poor example of leadership.

Early voting for the election takes place from October 19th - November 1st and election day is Tuesday, November 3rd.

== School libraries ==
Each school in the county has a Library/Media Center and a full-time, certified Media Specialist. The Media Specialist is responsible for creating and curating the school's collection of online and physical books, periodicals, audio/visual materials, and maker space materials. Each school's collection is their own and should reflect the community around the school and the needs of the students and teachers at that site. Every library has a public-facing catalogue that allows the public to review all books in the library pursuant to Fl Senate Bill CS/HB 1467.

The school libraries have three main programs each year: Poetry Jam at the Middle and High School Level, SLAM, Student Literacy & Media, Showcase for all levels, and the Storytelling Festival for Elementary levels.

Poetry Jam is a coordination between the Hillsborough County Public Schools Library Media Services and the Arts in Education Department. Local Poets come to school libraries to host writing workshops with students who then participate in a school level Jam competition. At the high school level, the top three students get to advance to a district competition.

SLAM Showcase is a celebration of reading based around the SSYRA Jr, Sunshine State Young Readers Award Junior, SSYRA, Sunshine State Young Readers Award, and Florida Teen Reads selected works each year. Students interested in participating read one of the works for their age level and then create art based on the book, either 2D, 3D, or digital art. Each school then selects students from each category to attend a festival at the Tampa Convention Center where all the art is displayed and several authors of the works participate in a panel discussion with time for student questions and then book signings.

The Storytelling Festival is put on by the Tampa-Hillsborough County Public Library and Hillsborough County Public School Libraries participates each year by bringing storytellers into elementary schools to host workshops for students. Students may then choose to sign up to participate in the storytelling festival and tell their own memorized piece.

== Athletics ==
Hillsborough County Schools provides athletic opportunities for high school boys in baseball, basketball, cross country, football, golf, soccer, swimming, tennis, track and field, wrestling, and lacrosse. For high school girls, the sports are basketball, cheer, cross country, flag football, golf, soccer, softball, swimming, tennis, track and field, lacrosse, wrestling, and volleyball.

== Strawberry Schools ==
Prior to 1956, many of the schools in the county in the eastern section near Plant City maintained an unusual schedule based on the strawberry growing season. These schools were closed from January through March and were referred to as Strawberry Schools. Among these schools were the Glover School, Cork, Keysville, Pinecrest, and Turkey Creek. Some schools in this area of the county retain one vestige of the old schedule; rather than having a spring holiday for the Florida State Fair, they celebrate a holiday for the Florida Strawberry Festival.

== Integration ==
Like most public school systems in the southern United States, Hillsborough County once maintained a strictly racially segregated school system. Several schools had a population of 100 percent minority students, including Don Thompson Vocational High School in Tampa, (now known as Blake High School) and the Glover School in Bealsville, Florida near Plant City, while most public schools were for white students only. Following the U.S. Supreme Court's Brown v. Board of Education decision of 1954, a federal district court found in 1962 that Hillsborough County was operating an "illegally segregated public school system". The district spent much of the next 9 years employing various strategies designed to delay integration of the schools. Hillsborough County began integrating select schools during the 1965–1966 school year, but in 1971, a federal judge ruled that the pace was too slow and ordered the school district to initiate a comprehensive desegregation program. The school system responded with a busing program designed to result in the same percentage of students by race in each school. The program put almost all of the burden of busing on the black community. Historically black schools, such as Blake and Middleton, were "demoted" to junior high school status and students and teachers, including many who had been there for decades, were reassigned to white suburban schools. Black students faced busing for 10 out of 12 years, while for whites they were only bused 2 of 12 years. While a relatively small number of white flight schools were founded in this time period, three of the five schools hosted grades six and seven only (the grades in which white students were bused.) Immediately following integration the incidents of school discipline grew rapidly, with half of the students disciplined being black, despite making up only one fifth the student population. After continued complaints by activists, the disciplinary situation began to be more equitable after 1974.

In 1991, the district received court approval for a cluster plan to lessen disruption to students. As part of this plan, the district created magnet schools to attract white students to historically black schools, and single-grade schools were replaced with groupings of ages, such as middle schools. In 1994, the NAACP sued the district, alleging that the schools were being resegregated, with some schools being as much as 90% black. A 1998 court ruling agreed that Hillsborough County's school's were not yet "desegregated to the maximum extent practicable" and continued federal monitoring of the process. For the 2001–2002 school year, the district replaced its busing program with a new school choice in an attempt to reduce re-segregation. In 2001, a federal court of appeals declared that the district's schools were "unitary", meaning that they were sufficiently integrated and federal monitoring was no longer required.

== Security ==
The school district utilizes Hillsborough County Public Schools Security Services and the Hillsborough County Sheriffs Office at many schools around the county. Known as School Resource Officers, they provide armed security along with other services where they are assigned. Other jurisdictions assist with service calls in a backup capacity. These agencies include Plant City Police Department, Temple Terrace Police Department, and Tampa Police Department. During some local school sponsored sporting events the district will utilize the Florida Highway Patrol, USF Police Department, and Tampa Airport Police Department in conjunction with the other agencies to provide security. Since the school sponsored events are generally served by off-duty law enforcement officers, other local agencies may also be present.

== Gates Foundation grant ==
In 2009, the Hillsborough County School District was awarded a $100-million-dollar grant by the Bill and Melinda Gates Foundation to improve education through improved mentoring and evaluation of teachers. For six years, the grant funded the "Empowering Effective Teachers" plan.

=== Empowering Effective Teachers ===
Empowering Effective Teachers was an initiative to promote improvements in education in the school district by increasing effective teaching through new teacher assessments, salary scales, teacher training programs and recruitment. The early phases of the initiative rolled out in 2010, when the district's teacher evaluation form was radically redeveloped into a complex rubric with four areas of focus and multiple subpoints within each area.

The new evaluation standard caused an uproar in the district, mainly due to how classroom evaluations have been implemented since the plan's roll out. Across the state of Florida, 40 percent of a teacher's final evaluation score now is determined by calculating students' learning growth from one year to the next, and a similar policy has been implemented across other states.

In response to the increased demands placed on teachers by the new evaluation system, teachers who opted into the new system would receive a pay increase. The initial increase for most was at least a few thousand dollars, with those earning evaluation scores of 4 or 5 receiving an additional $2,000 or $3,000 each year, respectively. The new pay scale was released at the end of 2013, and all teachers hired before 2011 had a few months to evaluate the new pay scale for deciding if they would opt in. Teachers who did not opt in were not exempt from the new evaluation system; however, their pay would not be affected by their final evaluation score.
