= Cityscape of Tampa, Florida =

The cityscape of Tampa includes historic and architecturally noteworthy structures in its downtown and residential areas. The Seminole Heights and Hyde Park neighborhoods are two of the largest historic preservation districts in Tampa.

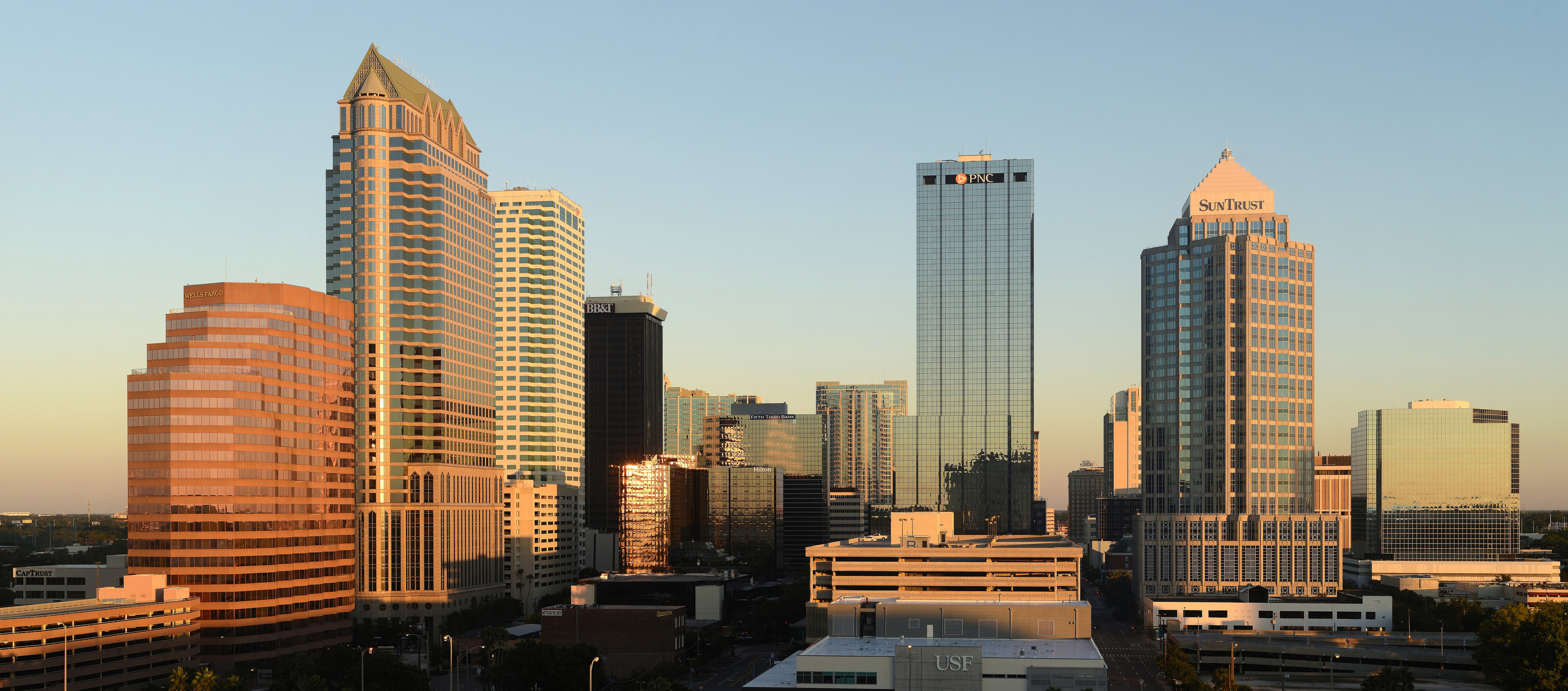
Skyline of Tampa near sunrise

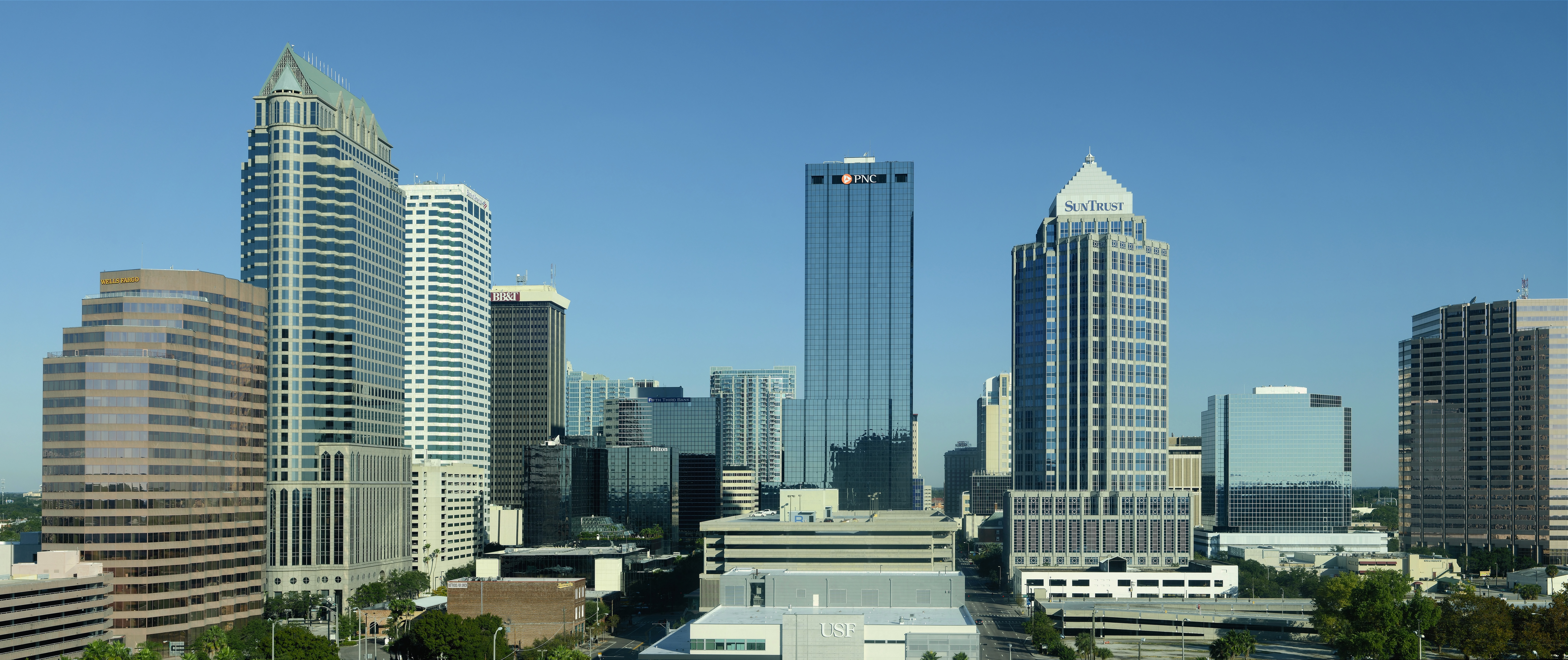
Skyline of Tampa in the morning

== Business districts ==
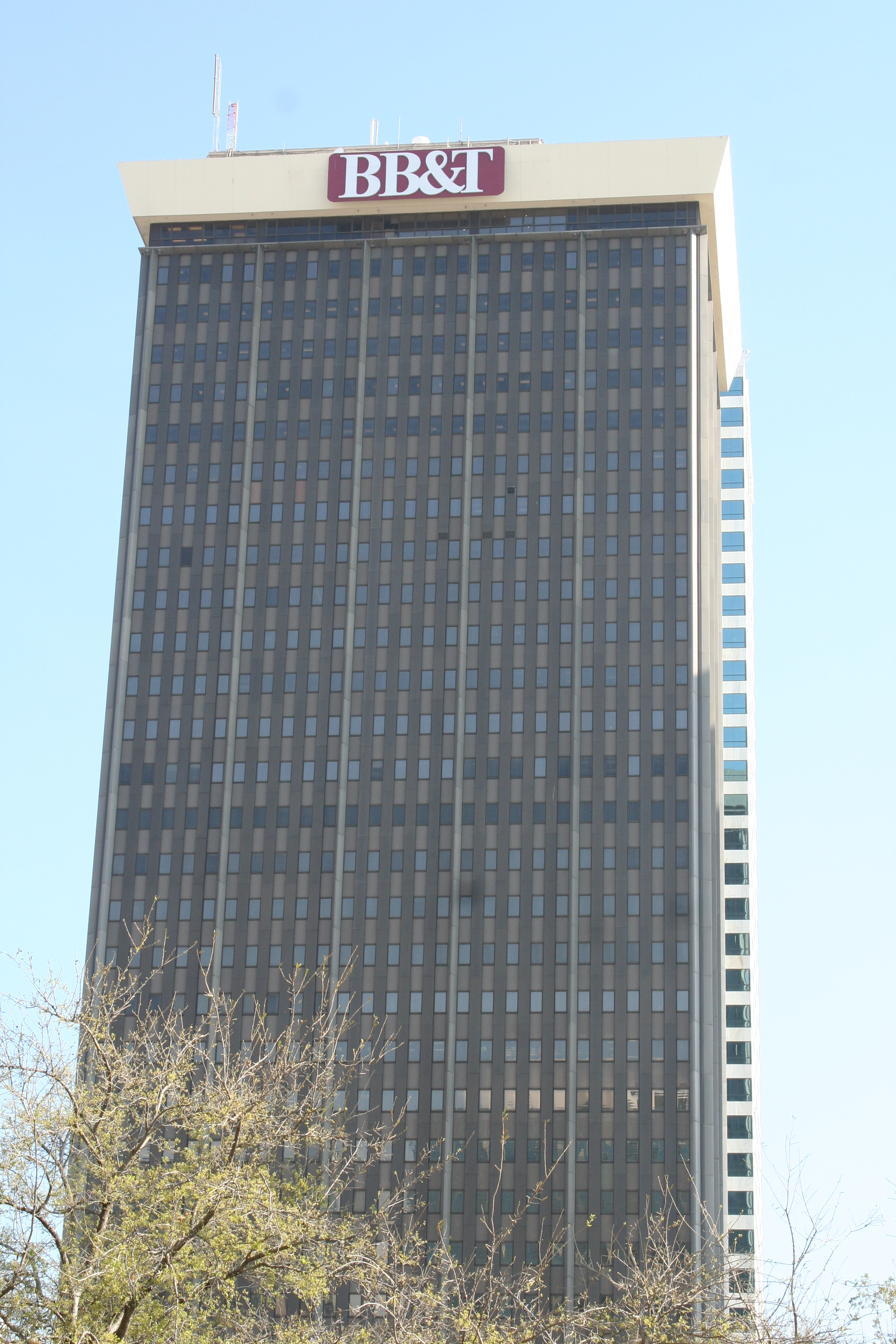
BB&T bank building is one of the financial businesses downtown

The downtown business district of Tampa is located immediately east of the Hillsborough River, and southwest of the Ybor City Historic District. Downtown includes the Tampa Theatre, Rivergate Tower, Tampa Museum of Art, Glazer Children's Museum, Florida Museum of Photographic Arts, Kress building, Straz Performing Arts Center, SunTrust building. Tampa International Airport is located approximately 4 miles (6 km) west-northwest of the downtown area, and easily connected to most parts of the city by three Interstate Highways, maximizing its accessibility. The largest industrial sections of town are located to the north of the airport and east of the city limits, while most of the residential areas of the city are located to the southwest, northwest, northeast and west of downtown.

Another major business district is the Westshore Business District, located east of Tampa Bay and south of Tampa International Airport. Currently, Westshore has more than 11 million square feet (1,000,000 m^{2}) of commercial office space, 4,000 businesses with nearly 100,000 employees, 32 hotels, 2 major shopping malls (International Plaza and Bay Street and WestShore Plaza). The city of Tampa has 165 parks with 2,286 acres (9 km^{2}) within its borders.

== Architecture ==
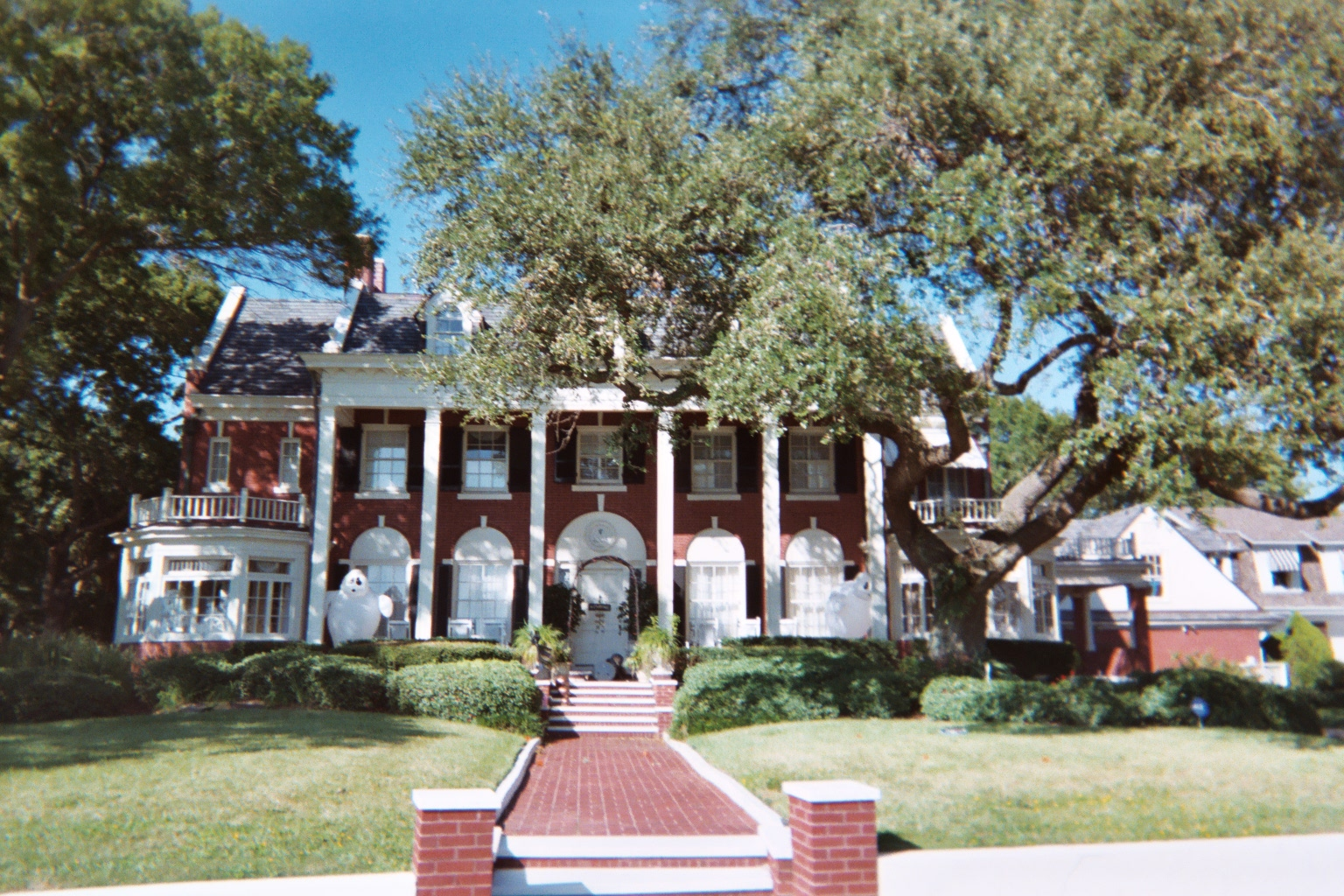
Colonial house in Hyde Park

The city's architecture contains a blend of old and new. The neighborhoods of Seminole Heights, Tampa Heights, and Hyde Park neighborhoods are historic preservation districts featuring mostly Victorian homes and buildings.

=== Tampa Bay Hotel ===
In 1891, Henry B. Plant built a lavish 500+ room, 1/4-mile-long (400 m), US$2.5 million eclectic/Moorish Revival-style luxury resort hotel called the Tampa Bay Hotel among 150 acres (60 ha) of manicured gardens along the banks of the Hillsborough River. Plant's resort featured a race track, a heated indoor pool, a golf course, a 2,000-seat auditorium, tennis courts, stables, hunting and fishing tours, and electric lights and telephones in every room, plus the first elevator in town and exotic art collectibles which Plant had shipped in from around the world.

The Tampa Bay Hotel was relatively prosperous for about a decade. The resort hosted thousands of guests and many celebrities of the era, but was only filled to capacity during the Spanish–American War (see below). Henry Plant died in 1899, and his heirs sold the facilities to the city of Tampa in 1904. The city operated the hotel and used the grounds as a community gathering place until 1932, when the resort was closed, remodeled, and reopened as the University of Tampa a year later.

== Neighborhoods and districts ==
The city is divided into many neighborhoods, many of which were towns and unincorporated communities that were annexed by the growing city. Generally, the city is divided into the following areas: Downtown Tampa, New Tampa, West Tampa, East Tampa, North Tampa, and South Tampa.

=== Surrounding communities ===
Northwest: Citrus Park, Oldsmar, Palm Harbor, Tarpon Springs, Carrollwood, Northdale, New Port Richey, Port Richey, Odessa, East Lake, Keystone, Holiday, Dunedin, Trinity, Bayonet Point, Connerton, Beacon Square, Elfers, Jasmine Estates, Hudson, Shady Hills, Spring Hill	North: Lutz, Land o' Lakes, University Area, Cheval, Lake Magdalene, Saint Leo, San Antonio, Wesley Chapel	Northeast: Temple Terrace, Thonotosassa, Wesley Chapel South, Mango, New Tampa, Pebble Creek, Dade City, Lacoochee, Zephryhills, Crystal Springs
West: Westchase, Town 'n' Country, Egypt Lake, Leto, Clearwater, Largo, Clearwater Beach, Belleair, Feather Sound, Harbor Bluffs, Safety Harbor	Tampa	East: Brandon, Gibsonton, Seffner, Valrico, Dover, Plant City, East Tampa, Progress Village, Bloomingdale, Del Rio, Palm River, Orient Park
Southwest: St. Petersburg, St. Pete Beach, Indian Rocks Beach, Pinellas Park, Tierra Verde, Gulfport, Seminole, Treasure Island, Bay Pines, Kenneth City, South Pasadena, Madeira Beach	South: Apollo Beach, Anna Maria, Bradenton, Ellenton, Lakewood Ranch, Florida, Longboat Key, Memphis, Palmetto, Parrish, Sarasota, Siesta Key, Sun City Center, Venice	Southeast: Balm, Boyette, FishHawk, Gibsonton, Keysville, Lithia, Riverview, Ruskin, Sun City Center, Wimauma

=== East Tampa ===
On the eastern portion of the city lies residential neighborhoods of College Hill, Jackson Heights-Belmont Heights, Ybor City, East Ybor, Southeast Seminole Heights, Northeast Community, Northview Hills, Live Oaks Square, Rivergrove, Grant Park, South Nebraska, Woodland Terrace and the industrial section of Gary, just east of downtown. The historic section of Ybor City is also located within this district.

== Davis Islands and Harbour Island ==
Besides the financial district, two upscale residential neighborhoods are Davis Islands and Harbour Island.

=== South Tampa ===
On the southern portion of the city lies residential neighborhoods of Ballast Point, Fair Oaks - Manhattan Manor, Gandy-Sun Bay South (or just Sun Bay South), Golf View, Palma Ceia, South Westshore, Bayshore Beautiful, Bayshore Gardens, Belmar Shore, Port Tampa, Golfview, New Suburb Beautiful, and Virginia Park. The region also contains portions of Sunset Park and Oscawana.

=== West Tampa ===
On the western portion of the city lies residential neighborhoods of Armenia Gardens Estates, Beach Park, Beach Park Isles, Bon Air, Carver City-Lincoln Gardens, Culbreath Bayou, Culbreath Isles, Drew Park, Gray Gables, Lowry Park, Mid-Peninsula, Midtown, North Bon Air, North Hyde Park, Oakford Park, Palma Ceia West, Parkview, Plaza Terrace, Ridgewood River, Riverbend, Riverside Heights, South Seminole Heights, Wellswood, West Tampa, Westshore Palms.

In the West Tampa District, the sublets include Bowman Heights, MacFarlane Park, Northeast Macfarlane, Marina Club, and Old West Tampa.

The West Tampa region also contain parts of Lowry Park North, Southeast Seminole Heights, Sunset Park and Tampa Heights.

=== North Tampa/New Tampa ===
On the northern portion of the city lies residential neighborhoods of Forest Hills, Sulphur Springs, Temple Crest, Terrace Park, University Square, and North Tampa (neighborhood).

Meanwhile, with characteristics of its own, the New Tampa district contains several upscale neighborhoods. They include Hunter's Green, West Meadows, Hunter's Key, and Tampa Palms.

== Tallest buildings ==
The tallest buildings in Tampa are all in downtown.

Building	Height (meters)	Stories	Year Completed
100 North Tampa (formally AmSouth Building)	176	42	1992
Bank of America Tower	176	42	1986
One Tampa City Center	164	38	1981
SunTrust Financial Centre	160	36	1992
Element	140	34	2009
Park Tower	140	36	1973
Rivergate Tower (known locally as the beer can building)	138	32	1988

== Skyline ==
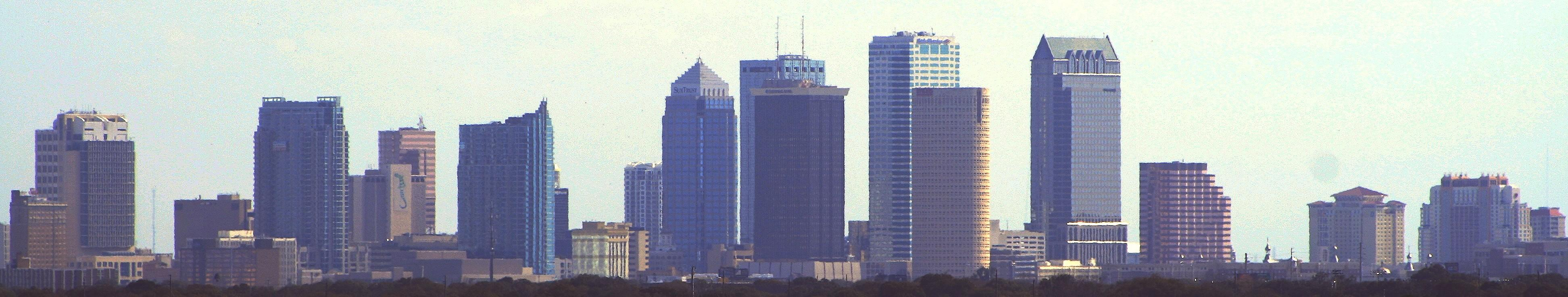
Tampa skyline panorama facing east.
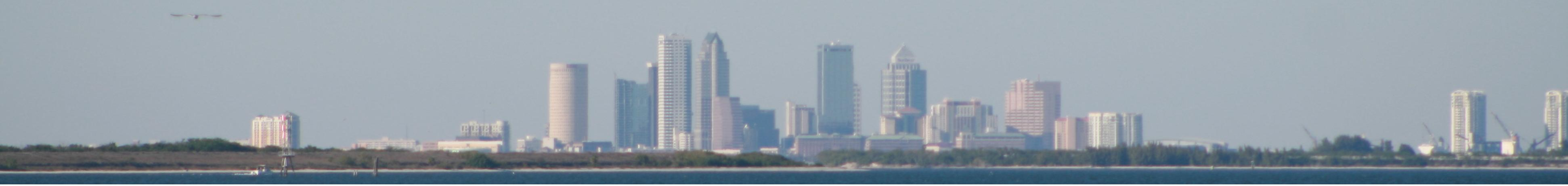
Downtown Tampa skyline from Apollo Beach

== Transportation infrastructure ==
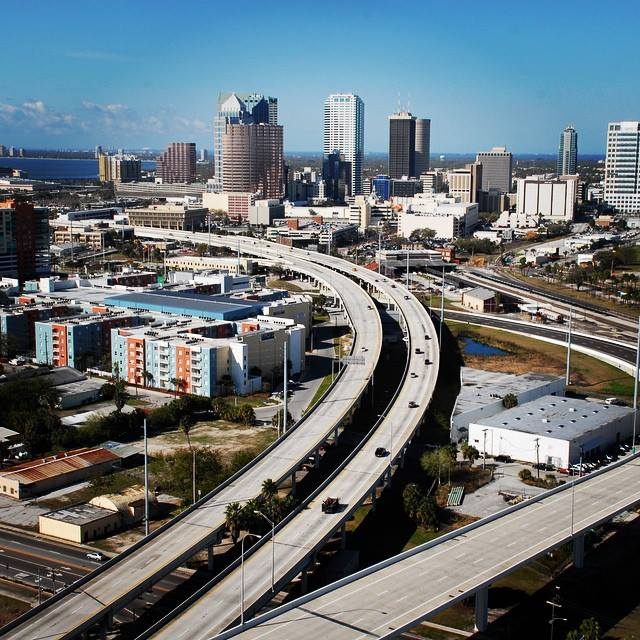
The Lee Roy Selmon Crosstown Expressway entering downtown

Along the city's western shore, three bridges span Old Tampa Bay carrying vehicular traffic to and from Pinellas County: the Howard Frankland Bridge (I-275), the Courtney Campbell Causeway (SR 60), and the Gandy Bridge (US 92).

Tampa is served by two major limited access toll road expressways. From its suburban eastern terminus of Brandon, the Lee Roy Selmon Expressway (SR 618) enters Tampa by way of a bridge crossing the Tampa Bypass Canal. It is a major commuter artery into downtown and continues down the South Tampa peninsula, ultimately reaching its western terminus at Gandy Boulevard (U.S. Route 92) near MacDill Air Force Base.

The Veterans Expressway (SR 589) begins at the city's western edge near the Tampa International Airport, connecting to SR 60's westbound Courtney Campbell Causeway and eastbound Memorial Highway. The Veterans Expressway leaves the city limits heading north to the suburbs of Carrollwood, Northdale, Westchase, Citrus Park, Cheval, and Lutz. Before leaving Hillsborough County, SR 589 becomes the Suncoast Parkway, which continues northward into Pasco and Hernando Counties.

Three Interstate Highways pass within the city limits. Interstate 4 originates from Tampa's Malfunction Junction, where it intersects Interstate 275. I-275 is a main artery into the city from Pinellas County, and continues into downtown and northward through neighborhoods like Seminole Heights and Sulphur Springs before leaving Tampa to reunite with Interstate 75 at the Pasco county line. Immediately south of this junction, I-75 crosses through the city neighborhood of New Tampa.

Other main arteries within the city include major surface roads like Hillsborough Avenue, Dale Mabry Highway, Bruce B. Downs Boulevard, Busch Boulevard, Nebraska Avenue, Florida Avenue, Fowler Avenue, Kennedy Boulevard, Adamo Drive, and Dr. Martin Luther King Jr. Boulevard.

== Other infrastructure ==
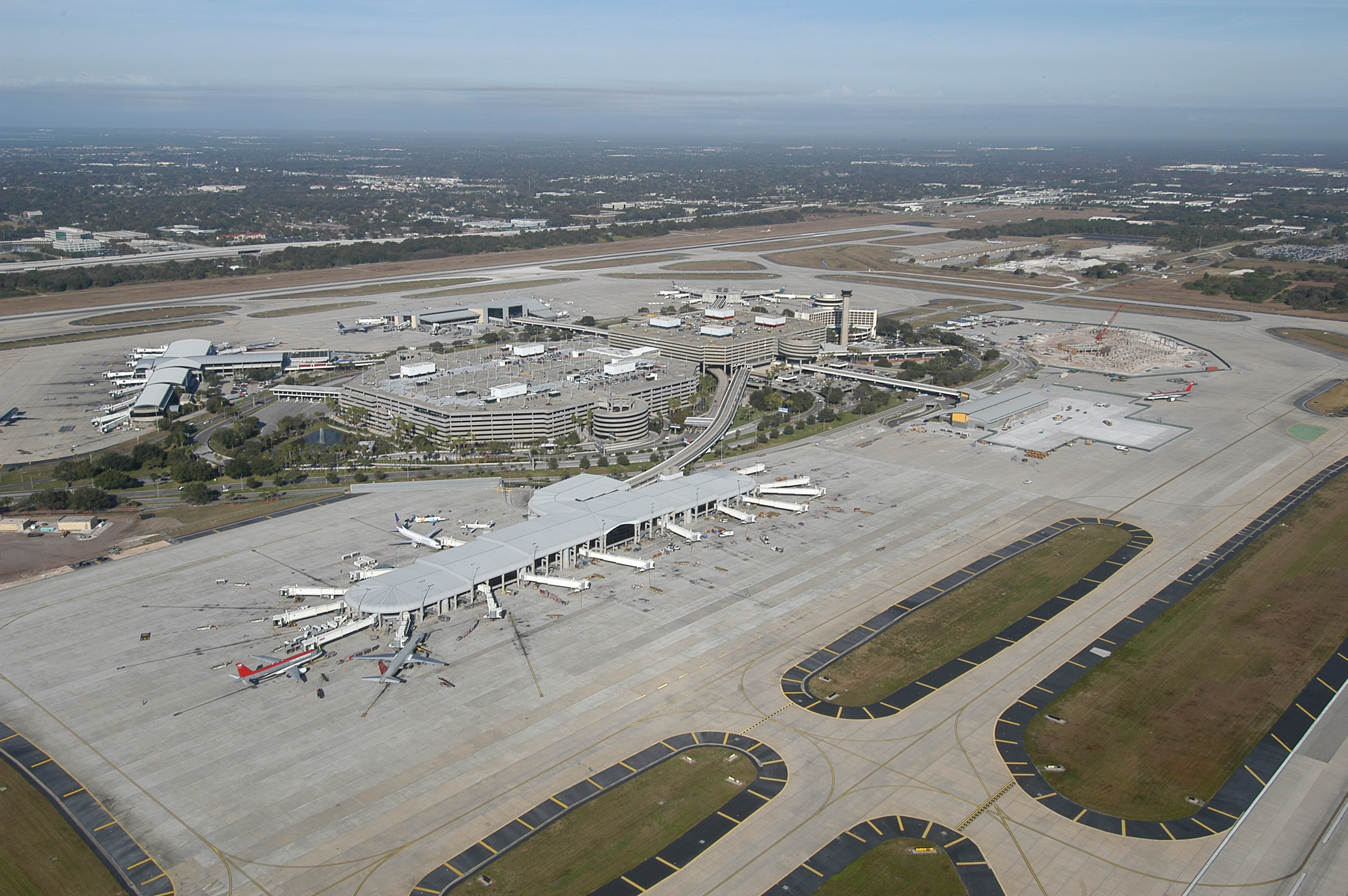
Tampa International Airport

=== Airports ===
- Tampa International Airport (IATA: TPA, ICAO: KTPA) is Tampa's main airport and primary location for passenger commercial airline service into the Tampa Bay area. During 2008, it was the 26th-busiest airport in North America. The airport is a consistent favorite in surveys of the industry and the traveling public. The readers of Condé Nast Traveler have frequently placed Tampa International in their list of Best Airports, ranking it #1 in 2003, and #2 in 2008 A survey by Zagat in 2007 ranked Tampa International first among U.S. airports in overall quality.
- Peter O. Knight Airport (IATA: TPF, ICAO: KTPF) is a small general aviation terminal located on Davis Islands near downtown.
- Tampa Executive Airport (IATA: VDF, ICAO: KVDF), formerly known as Vandenberg Airport, is another option for general aviation fliers. The airport is located east of Tampa in Hillsborough County, near the I-4/I-75 interchange.
- St. Petersburg-Clearwater International Airport (IATA: PIE, ICAO: KPIE) lies just across the bay from Tampa International Airport. Though mainly a general aviation facility, the airport has become an increasingly popular location for passenger service by discount and charter carriers.

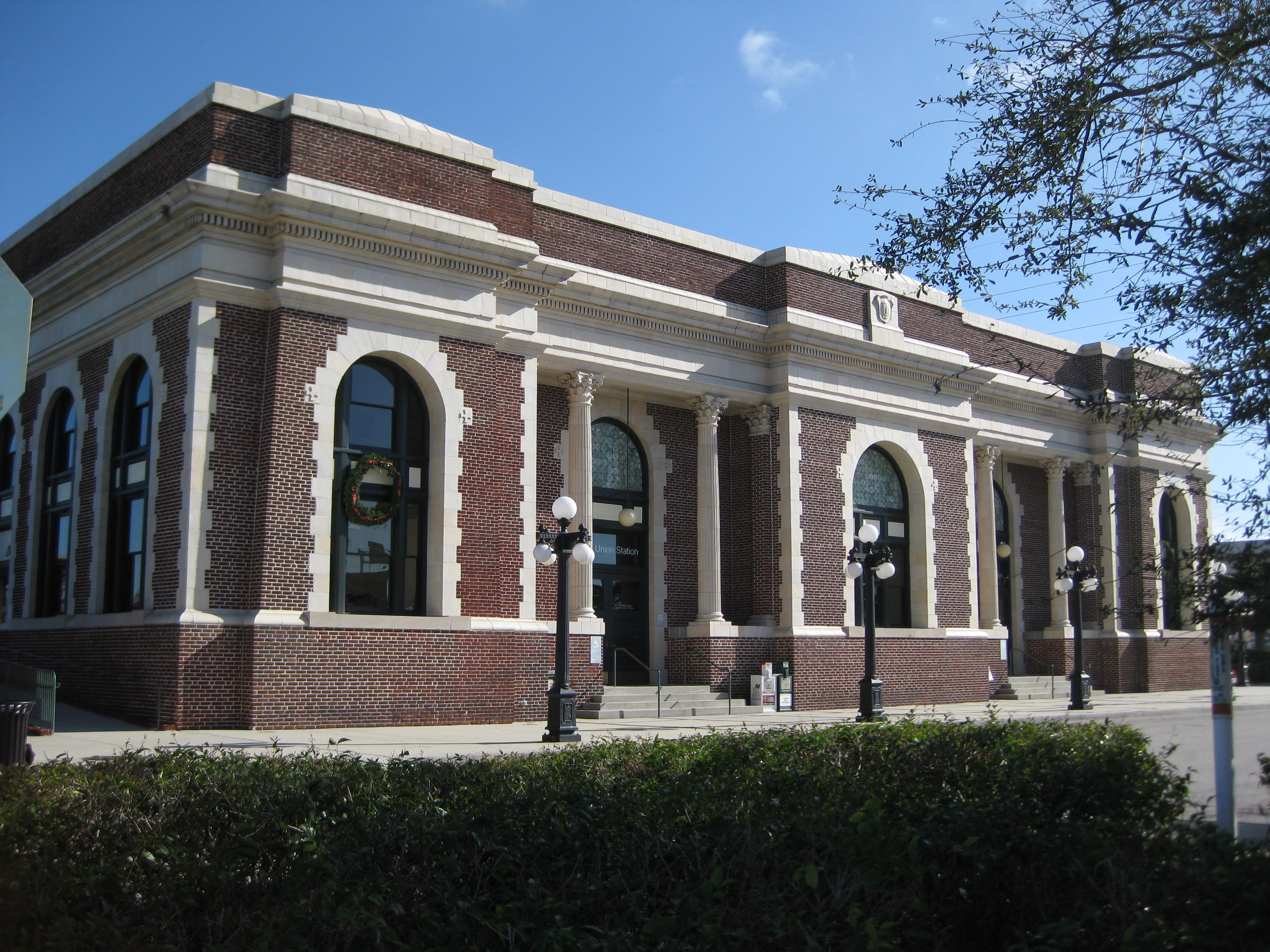
Tampa Union Station

=== Railroads ===
The railroad legacy brought to Tampa by Henry Plant continues to serve the city. Uceta Rail Yard was established by Plant System corporate descendant, Atlantic Coast Line Railroad, in the Gary industrial sector on Tampa's east side, near Brandon. It continues to service CSX as a storage and intermodal freight transport facility today. Freight and container cargo operations at the city's seaports also depend upon dockside rail facilities.

Tampa's intercity passenger rail service has since 1912 been based out of Tampa Union Station. The historic facility, adjacent to downtown between the Channel District and Ybor City, is serviced by Amtrak today. Amtrak's Silver Star calls on Tampa twice daily: number 91 southbound to Miami and number 92 northbound for New York City.

Union Station also serves as the transfer hub for Amtrak Thruway service, offering bus connections to several cities in Southwest Florida, as well as to Orlando for transfers to the northbound Silver Meteor.

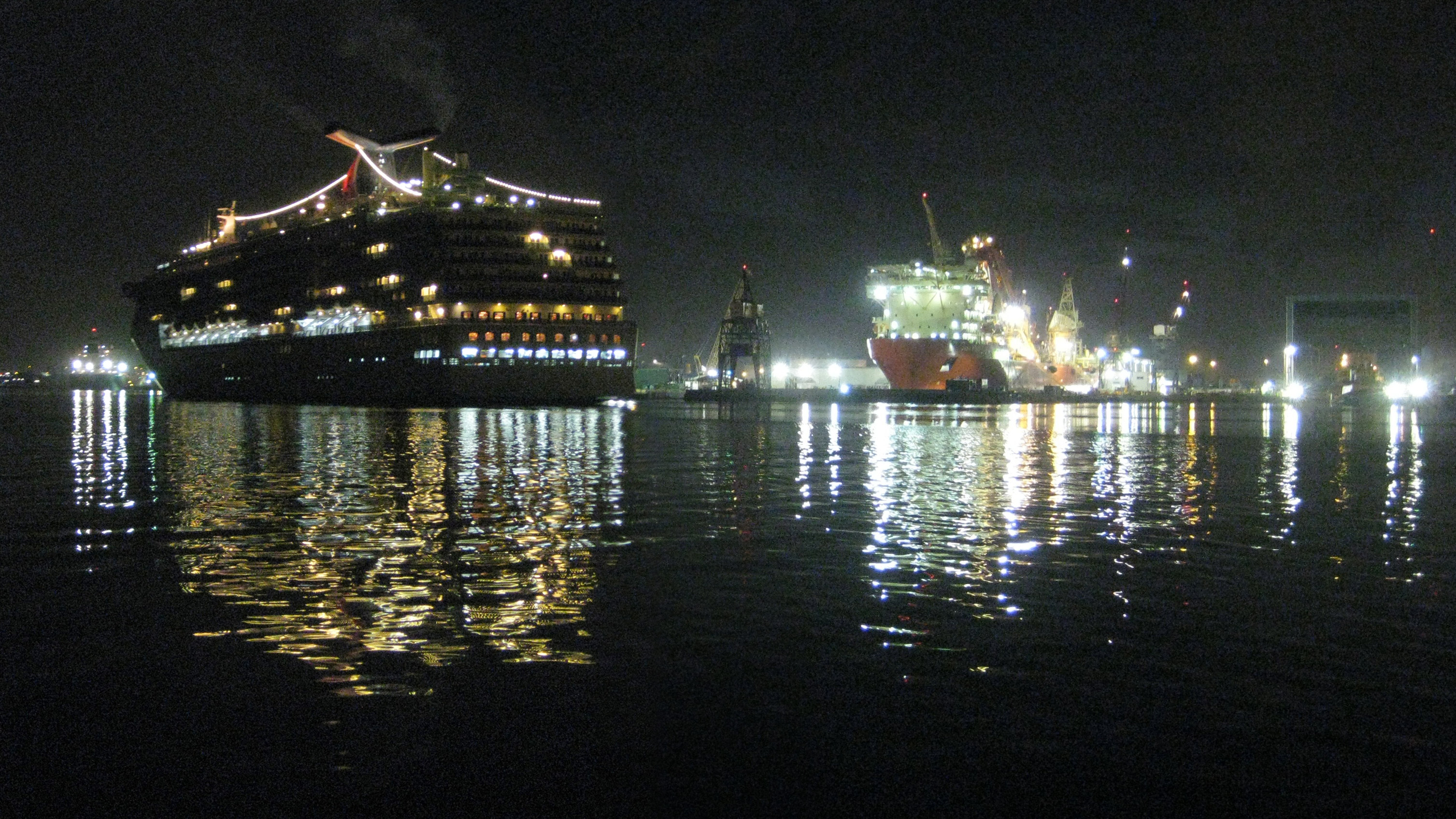
Early morning at the Port of Tampa

=== Seaports ===
Since Tampa Bay was first spotted by Spanish explorers in the 16th century, sailors have admired its wide, sheltered beauty. But it had a problem; it is naturally very shallow - less than 30 feet (9 m) deep almost everywhere and well less than that in many places near the coast, including the approach to the small town of Tampa. By the late 19th century, typical cargo ships had grown large enough that they were not able to navigate upper Tampa Bay and reach the ports of Tampa at all.

In 1899, however, the US Congress authorized the dredging of a 27' deep channel to Port Tampa, Henry Plant's rail-to-ship facility just west of Tampa. In 1917, another channel was dredged out to the Port of Tampa proper, instantly making Tampa an important shipping location.

The bay bottom is very sandy and the ship channels need constant dredging to keep them navigable to the largest modern cargo ships. Every year, the US Army Corps of Engineers dredge up enough sediment from the bay to fill Raymond James Stadium 10 times.

Today, the Port of Tampa is the largest port in Florida in throughput tonnage, making it one of the busiest commercial ports in North America. Petroleum and phosphate are the lead commodities, accounting for two-thirds of the 37 million tons of total bulk and general cargo handled by the port in 2009.

The Tampa Port Authority currently operates three cruise ship terminals in Tampa's Channel District. The Port of Tampa is home port year round for Carnival Cruise Lines' MS Carnival Inspiration and MS Carnival Legend. Tampa in 2010 will also be the seasonal home to Holland America Line's MS Ryndam, as well as Royal Caribbean International's MS Grandeur of the Seas and MS Radiance of the Seas. Cruise itineraries from Tampa visit the Eastern and Western Caribbean islands, Belize, and Mexico.

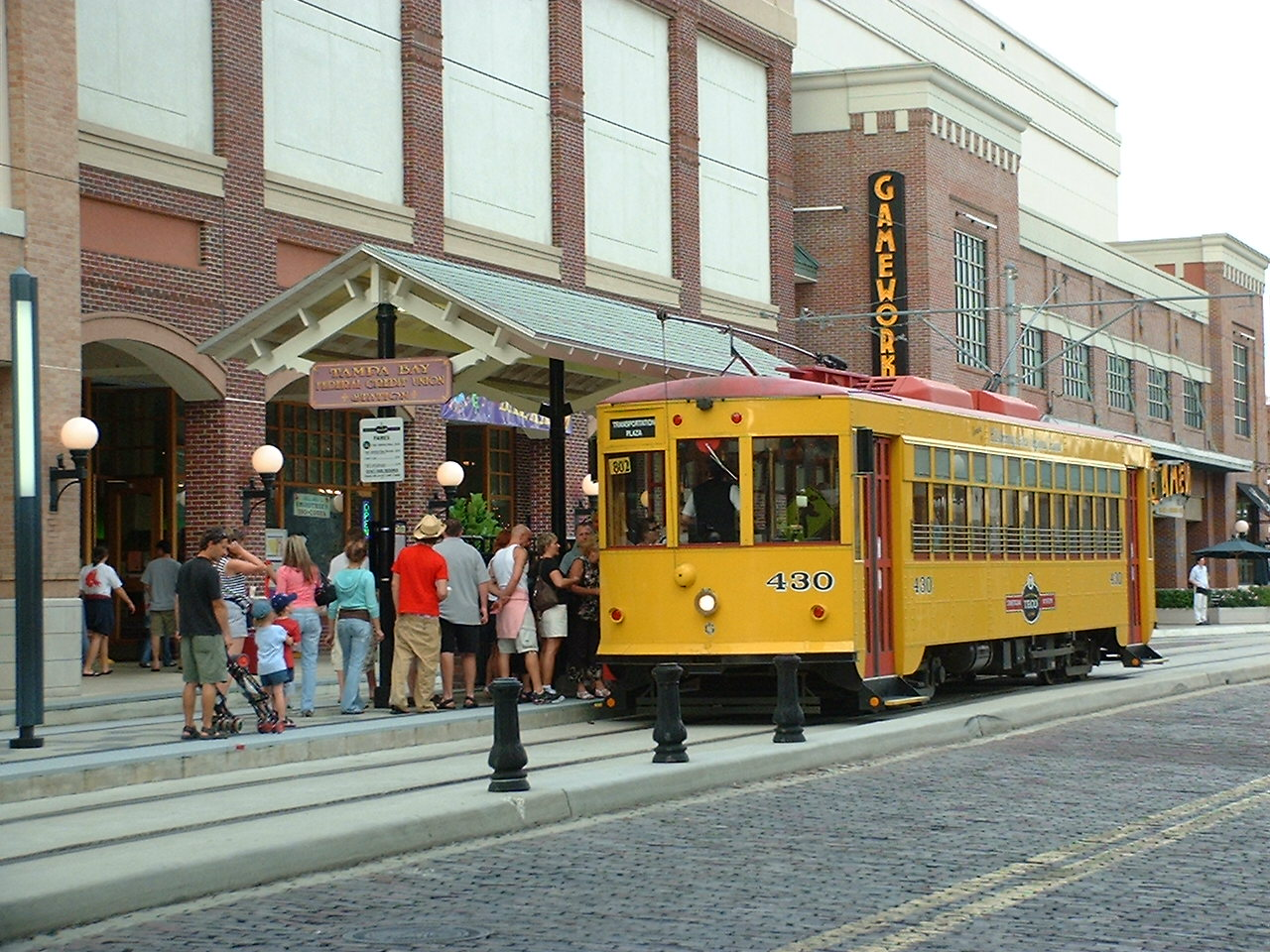
A TECO streetcar picking up passengers in Ybor City.

=== Mass Transit ===
Mass transit within Tampa is operated by the Hillsborough Area Regional Transit Authority (HART), and includes a public bus system and a streetcar line. HART has a signed transit deal with the University of South Florida, allowing students to ride for free on most bus routes, while students from other schools may receive discounted fares.

In October, 2002, the TECO Line Streetcar brought electric streetcar service back to Tampa for the first time in over half a century. The line operates from ten stations along a 2.4 mile (3.9 km) route, connecting Ybor City, the Channel District, the Tampa Convention Center, and downtown Tampa. The TECO Line Streetcar extension along Franklin Street to the Fort Brooke Parking Garage was completed in December 2010.

Drawing inspiration from the streetcars that traversed Tampa between the late 19th and mid 20th centuries, the TECO line cars include varnished wood interiors and other nostalgic appointments. Though they may appear old-fashioned, the modern fleet of cars are wheelchair accessible and air conditioned, offering increased comfort for Tampa in the 21st century.

== See also ==
- Neighborhoods in Tampa, Florida
