= Green ARTery =

Green ARTery is a greenway and trailway plan to connect neighborhoods in Tampa, Florida. The trails are bounded by the Hillsborough River to the North and West, McKay Bay and Old Tampa Bay to the South, and 40th Street to the East. Neighborhoods included in the ARTery include Old Seminole Heights, Southeast Seminole Heights, South Seminole Heights, Woodland Terrace, River Grove, Live Oaks Square, Lake Minihaha & Rogers Golf Course, Hampton Terrace, VM Ybor, East Tampa, Historic Ybor, Ybor Heights, East Ybor, Palmetto Beach, Downtown Tampa, Central Park, Tampa Heights, Ridgewood Park, Riverside Heights, and Channelside (Tampa).

The Green ARTery includes multi-use paths, park trails, neighborhood greenways and trailheads along a section of the Hillsborough River and through existing parks and trails. The system includes facilities for walkers, bicyclists, rollerbladers, kayakers, standup paddleboarders, and canoers. The group wants to connect existing sections in 20 central Tampa neighborhoods with bike and pedestrian trails. The proposed loop encloses 20 square miles in Seminole Heights, Ybor, downtown Tampa, and Channelside (Tampa). Impetus for the plan comes from Hillsborough County's being ranked highest in Florida for bicycle fatalities. The plan has the support of Tampa's city's Parks & Recreation Department and Mayor Bob Buckhorn. Completion of the pathways is slated for 2020.

== Parks along Green ARTery ==
- Curtis Hixon Park, downtown Tampa
- Cotanchobee Fort Brooke Park, Tampa central business district along water
- McKay Bay Nature Park

== Website ==
- Green ARTery website
