= Belmont Heights, Tampa =

Belmont Heights
- Neighborhood
- Location within the state of Florida
- Coordinates: 28°0′N 82°26′W
- Country: United States
- State: Florida
- County: Hillsborough
- City: Tampa
- Time zone: UTC-5 (Eastern (EST))
  - Summer (DST): UTC-4 (EDT)
- Area code: 813

Belmont Heights is a neighborhood within the district of East Tampa, which represents District 5 of the Tampa City Council. Demographically, The neighborhood did not report separately.

== Geography ==
Belmont Heights is located at latitude 27.992 north and longitude -82.425. The elevation is 52 feet above sea level. Its boundaries are roughly Southeast Seminole Heights(15th Street) to the west, Live Oaks Square (Hillsborough Avenue) to the north, Jackson Heights (30th Street) to the east, and V.M. Ybor and College Hill (21st Avenue)to the south.

== See also ==
- East Tampa
