= Old Seminole Heights =

- Neighborhood
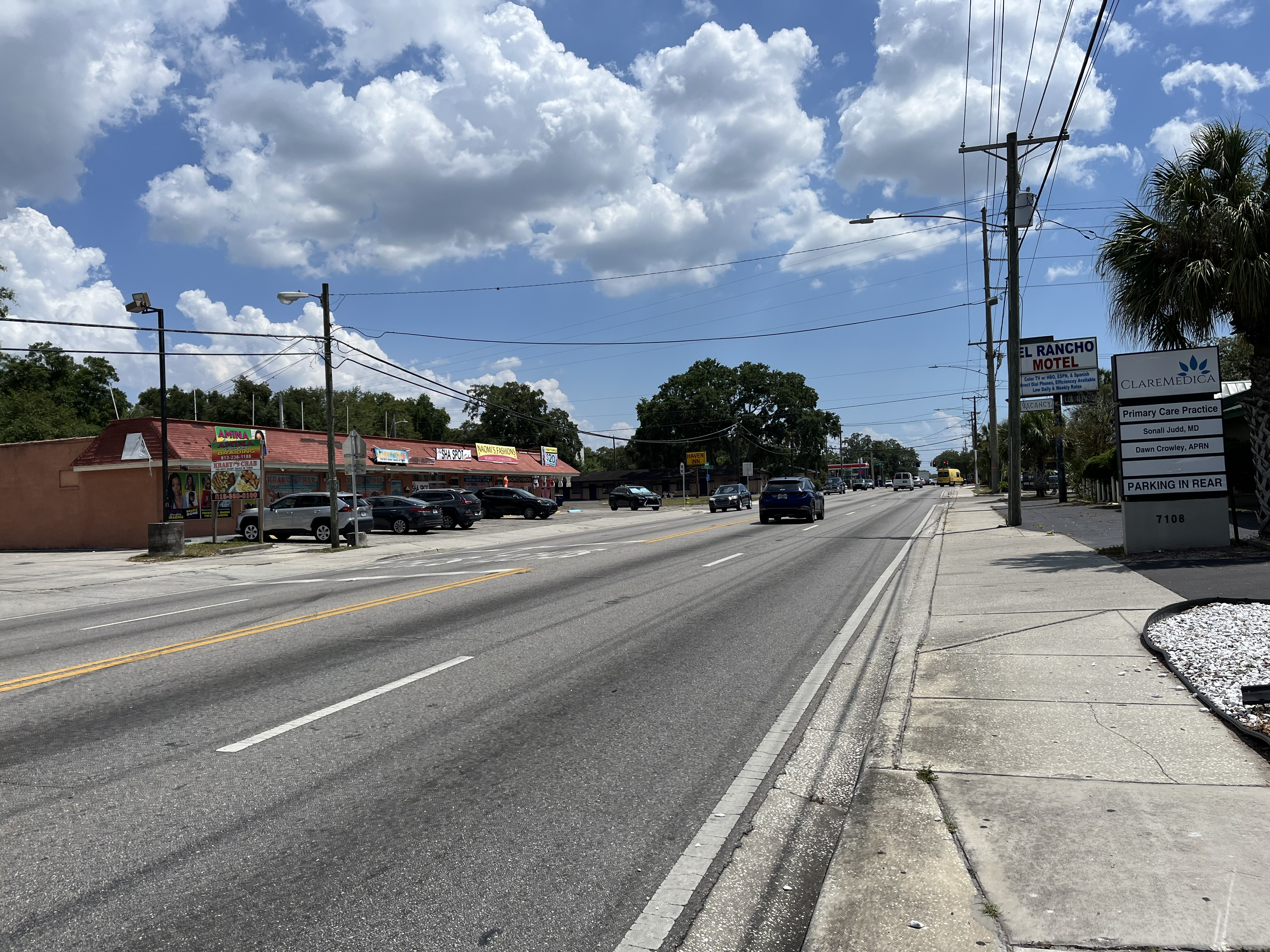

- Location within the state of Florida
- Coordinates: 28°0′19″N 82°27′8″W
- Country: United States
- State: Florida
- County: Hillsborough
- City: Tampa

Population (2010)
  - Total: 14,729
- Time zone: UTC-5 (Eastern (EST))
  - Summer (DST): UTC-4 (EDT)
- ZIP codes: 33603, 33604, and 33610
- Area code: 813

Old Seminole Heights is a neighborhood within the city limits of Tampa, in the U.S. state of Florida. The neighborhood is one of three which comprise the greater Seminole Heights district within the city. As of the 2010 census the neighborhood had a population of 14,729. The ZIP Codes serving the area are 33603, 33604, and 33610.

== Geography ==
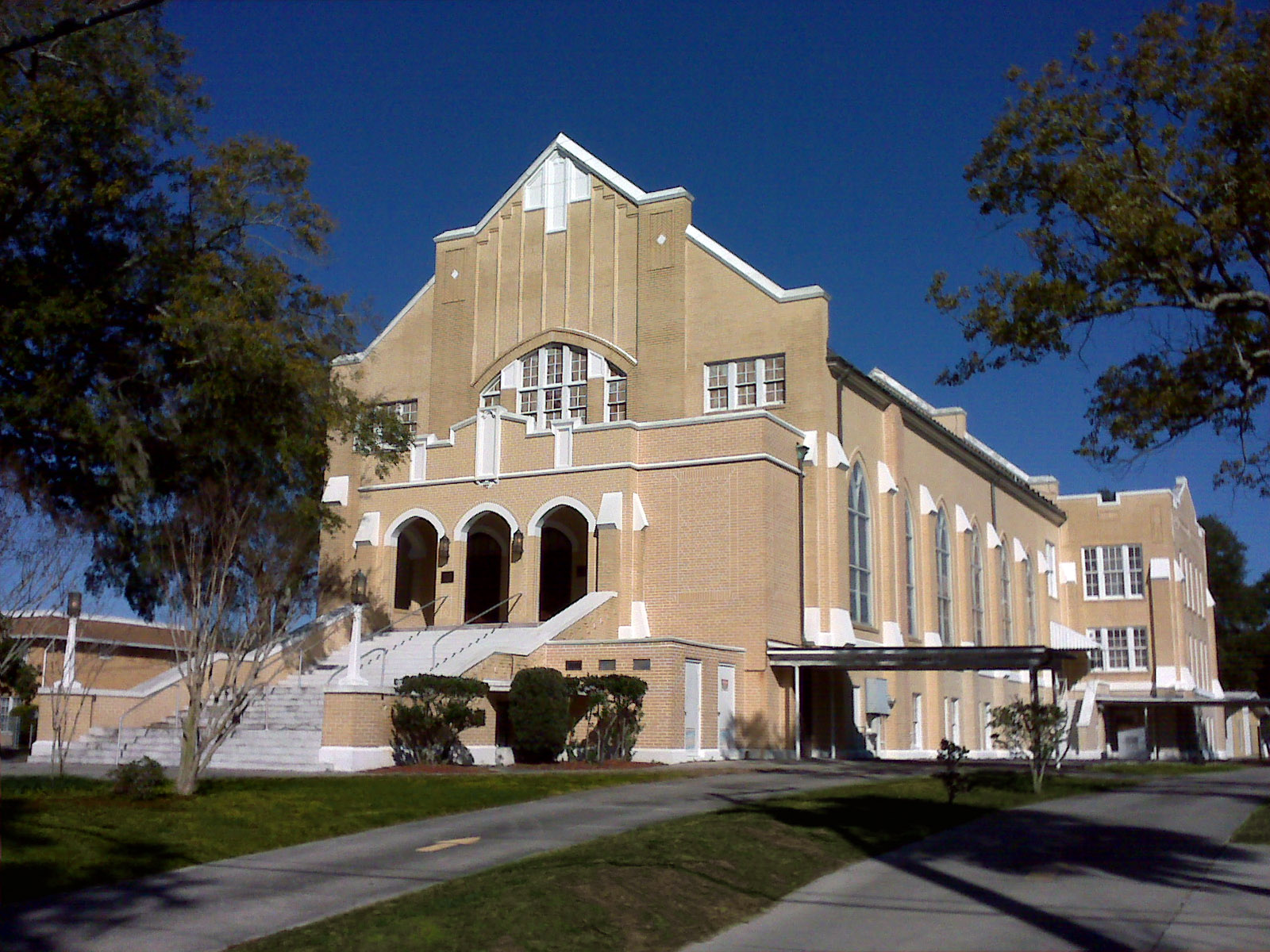
Seminole Heights Methodist Church is a prominent landmark in the Old Seminole Heights neighborhood.

Old Seminole Heights' boundaries are the separate neighborhood of Seminole Heights East to the east, Hillsborough River to the west and north, Sulphur Springs to the north, and Hillsborough Avenue to the south, with the exception of the area between Florida Avenue and I-275, where a rectangular section extends the southern boundary south of Hillsborough Avenue to Dr. Martin Luther King Jr. Boulevard.

The neighborhood is located in the northern edge of the area within Tampa known as Seminole Heights. Old Seminole Heights is the largest of the three distinct city of Tampa neighborhoods within the Seminole Heights district, the other two being South Seminole Heights and Southeast Seminole Heights.

Prominent neighborhood landmarks within Old Seminole Heights include Hillsborough High School, Memorial Middle School, Seminole Heights Elementary School, Seminole Heights United Methodist Church, St. Paul's Lutheran Church, and the Seminole Heights Garden Center, a city of Tampa park.

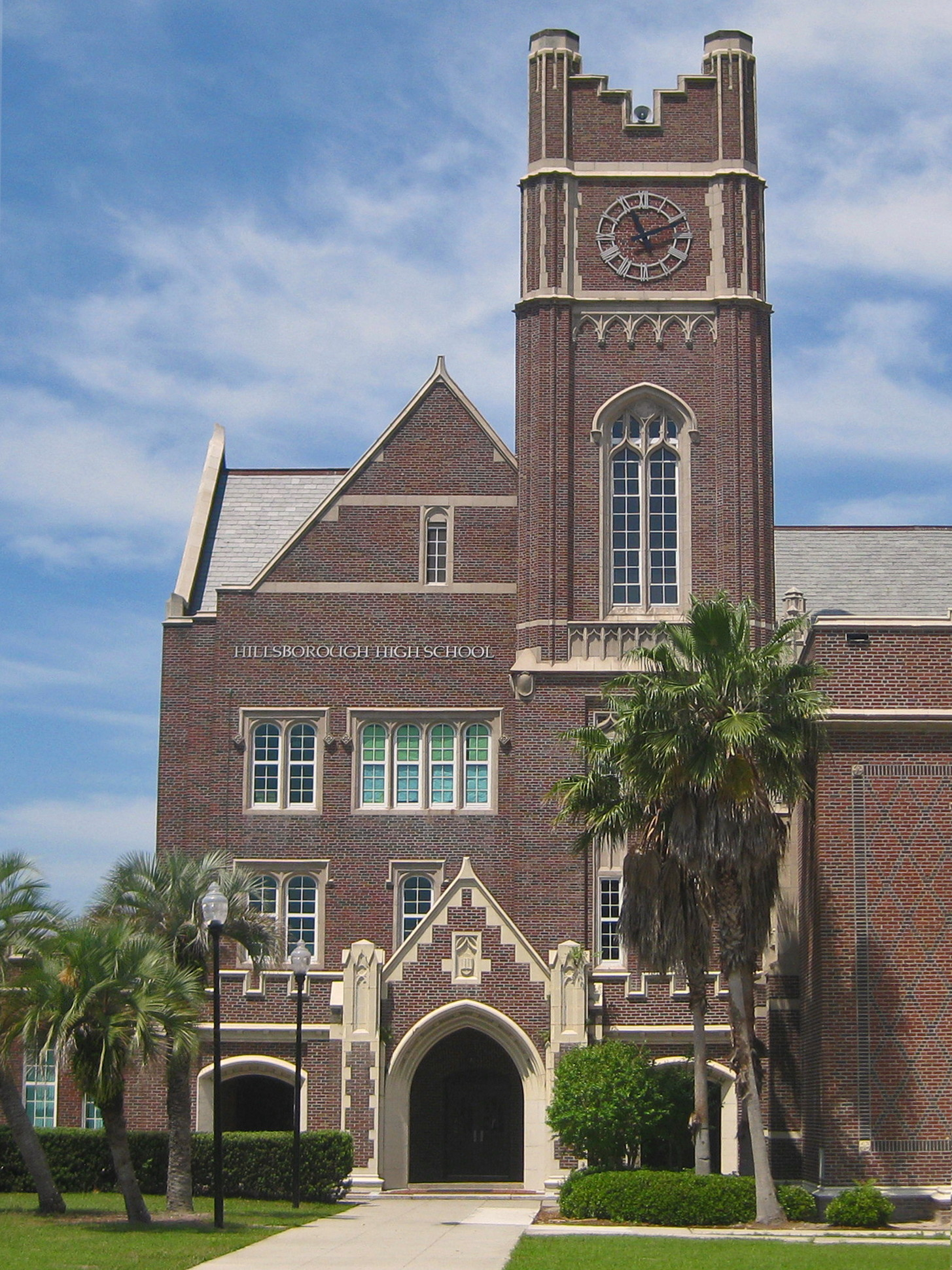
The campus for Hillsborough High School is located within Old Seminole Heights.

== Demographics ==
Source: Hillsborough Community Atlas

As of the census of 2010, there were 14,729 people and 6,199 households residing in the neighborhood. The population density was 4,185/mi^{2}. The racial makeup of the neighborhood was 69% White, 22% African American, 1% Native American, 1% Asian, 4% from other races, and 3% from two or more races. Hispanic or Latino of any race were about 22% of the population.

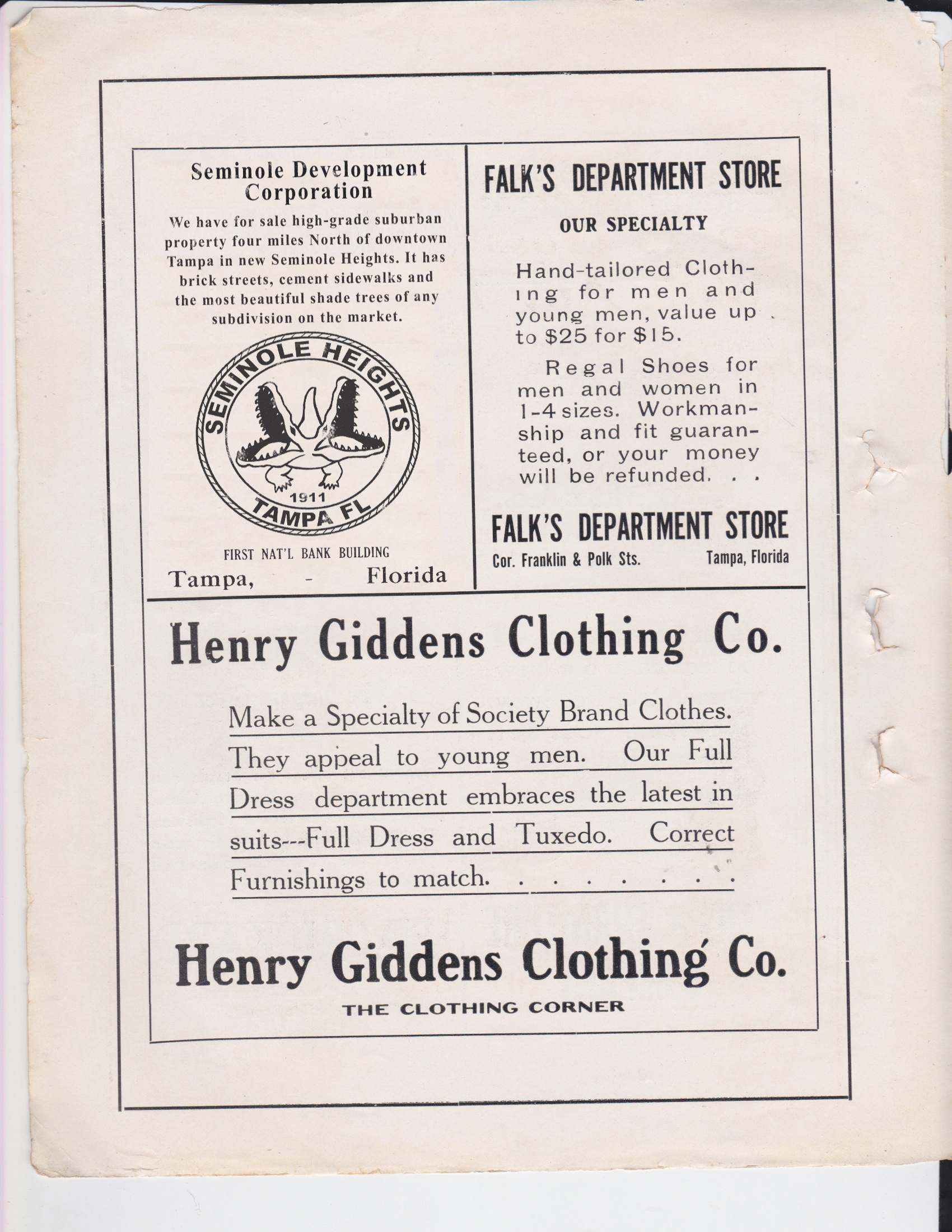
T Roy Young's Seminole Development Corporation Advertisement from the 1912 Hillsborough High School Yearbook with two headed alligator

There were 6,199 households, out of which 23% had children under the age of 18 living with them, 33% were married couples living together, 17% had a female householder with no husband present, and 13% non-families. 31% of all households were made up of individuals.

In the neighborhood the population was spread out, with 22% under the age of 18, 24% from 18 to 34, 24% from 35 to 49, 20% from 50 to 64, and 10% who were 65 years of age or older. For every 100 females, there were 95.6 males.

The per capita income for the neighborhood was $16,641. About 16% of the population were below the poverty line.

== Historic Districts ==
Old Seminole Heights contains two areas designated as U.S. Historic Districts and listed with the National Register of Historic Places. They are the Seminole Heights Residential District and Hampton Terrace Historic District.

Seminole Heights Residential District is also designated as a Local Historic District by the city of Tampa.

== See also ==
- Seminole Heights
- Neighborhoods in Tampa, Florida
- Seminole Heights Residential District
- Hampton Terrace Historic District
