= Seminole Heights Residential District =

Historic district in Florida, United States

- U.S. National Register of Historic Places
- U.S. Historic district
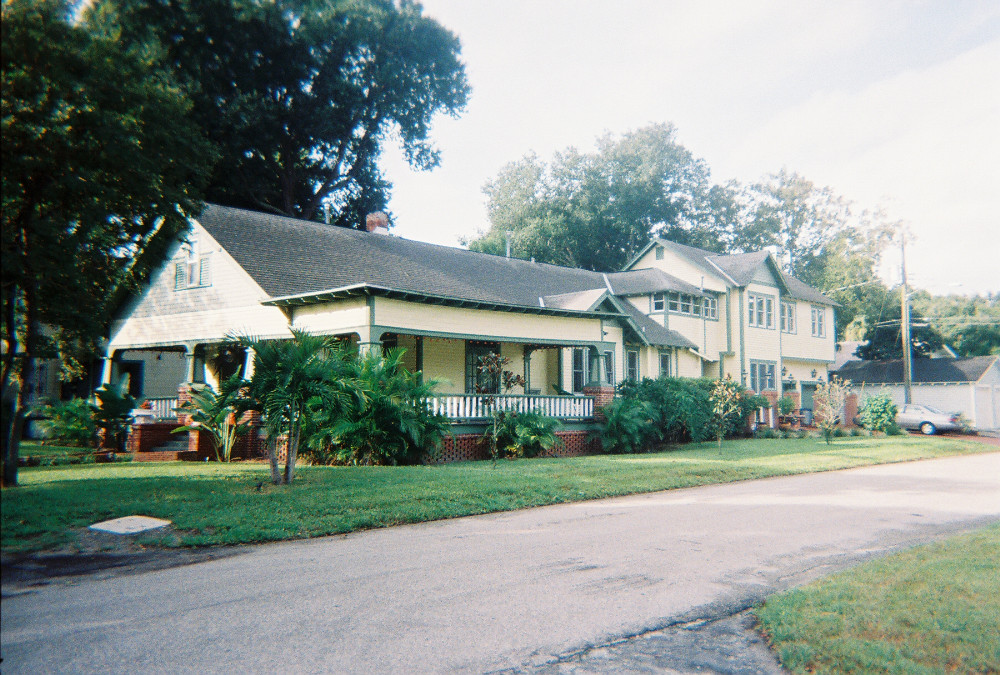
- House in district

- Location within Florida Location within the United States
- Location: Roughly bounded by Osborne, Florida, Hanna, and Cherokee Aves., Tampa, Florida
- Coordinates: 27°59′45″N 82°27′25″W
- Area: 170 acres (69 ha)
- Built: 1912 - 1928
- Architectural style: Bungalow/Craftsman, Gothic Revival
- NRHP reference No.: 93000751
- Added to NRHP: August 5, 1993

The Seminole Heights Residential District, known also as the Seminole Heights Historic District, is a U.S. and Local Historic District located in Tampa, Florida. The district is roughly bounded by Hanna Avenue to the north, Cherokee Avenue and I-275 to the east, Florida Avenue to the west, and Osborne Avenue to the south.

== National District ==
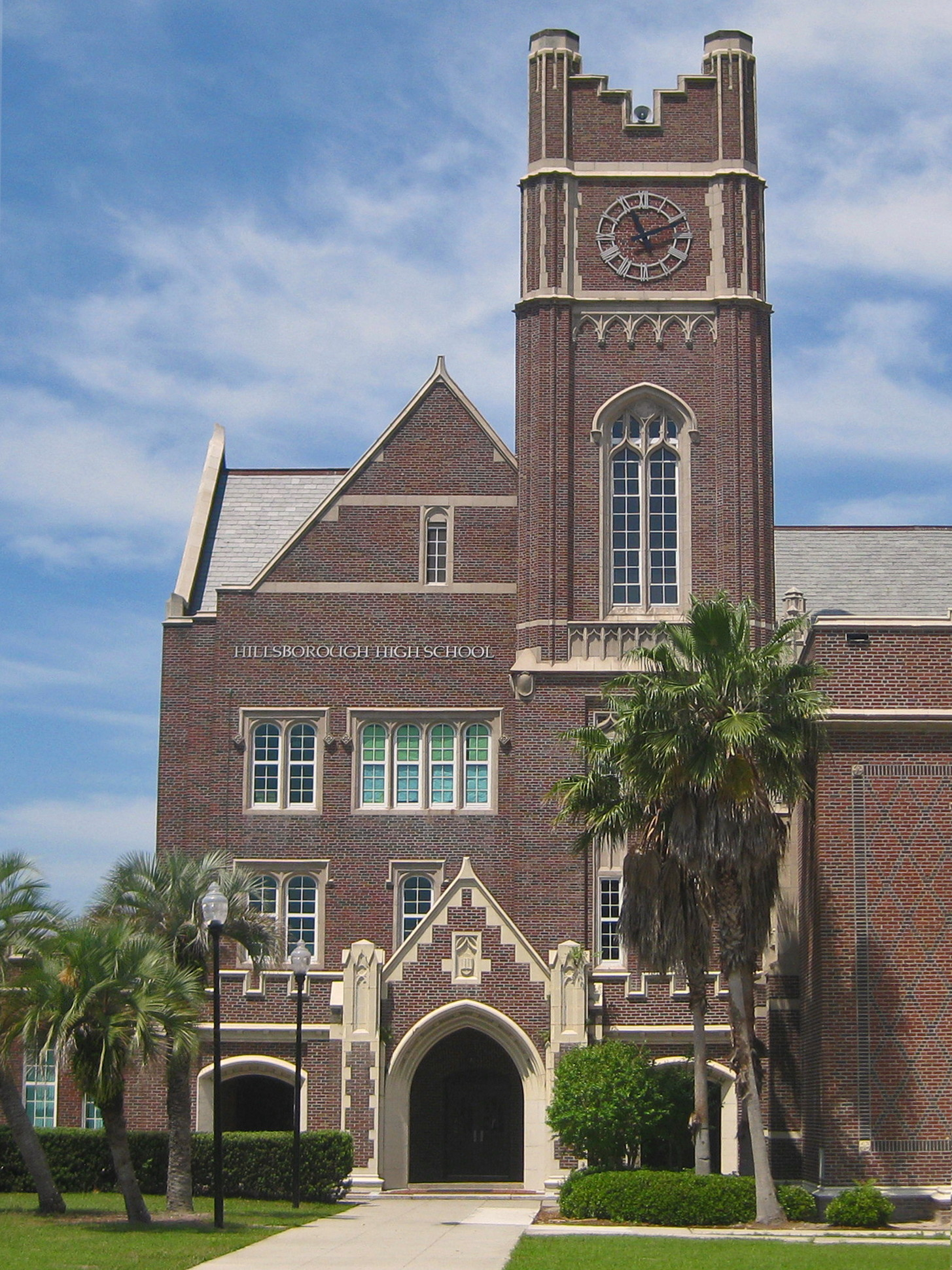
Hillsborough High School

Seminole Heights Residential District was designated a U.S. Historic District upon its inclusion in the National Register of Historic Places on August 5, 1993. The district encompasses 1,700 acres (6.9 km^{2}), and includes 325 buildings identified as contributing structures based on their historical and architectural significance to the district. Most of the buildings are private homes, but despite the "Residential" moniker, the district also includes public and community structures such as Seminole Heights United Methodist Church and Hillsborough High School. The later two are examples of Gothic Revival style, one of the architectural styles for which the district is recognized. Another style, which is represented in the neighborhood's numerous bungalows, is American Craftsman. All the contributing buildings in Seminole Heights Historic District date from the early 20th century, and the district is noted for historical significance from the period of 1912 - 1928.

The historic district is a part of the city's Old Seminole Heights neighborhood, one of three distinct neighborhoods within the greater Seminole Heights section of Tampa. Old Seminole Heights is home to two nationally recognized historic districts, of which Seminole Heights Residential District was the first. Hampton Terrace Historic District received its designation in 1999.

== Local District ==
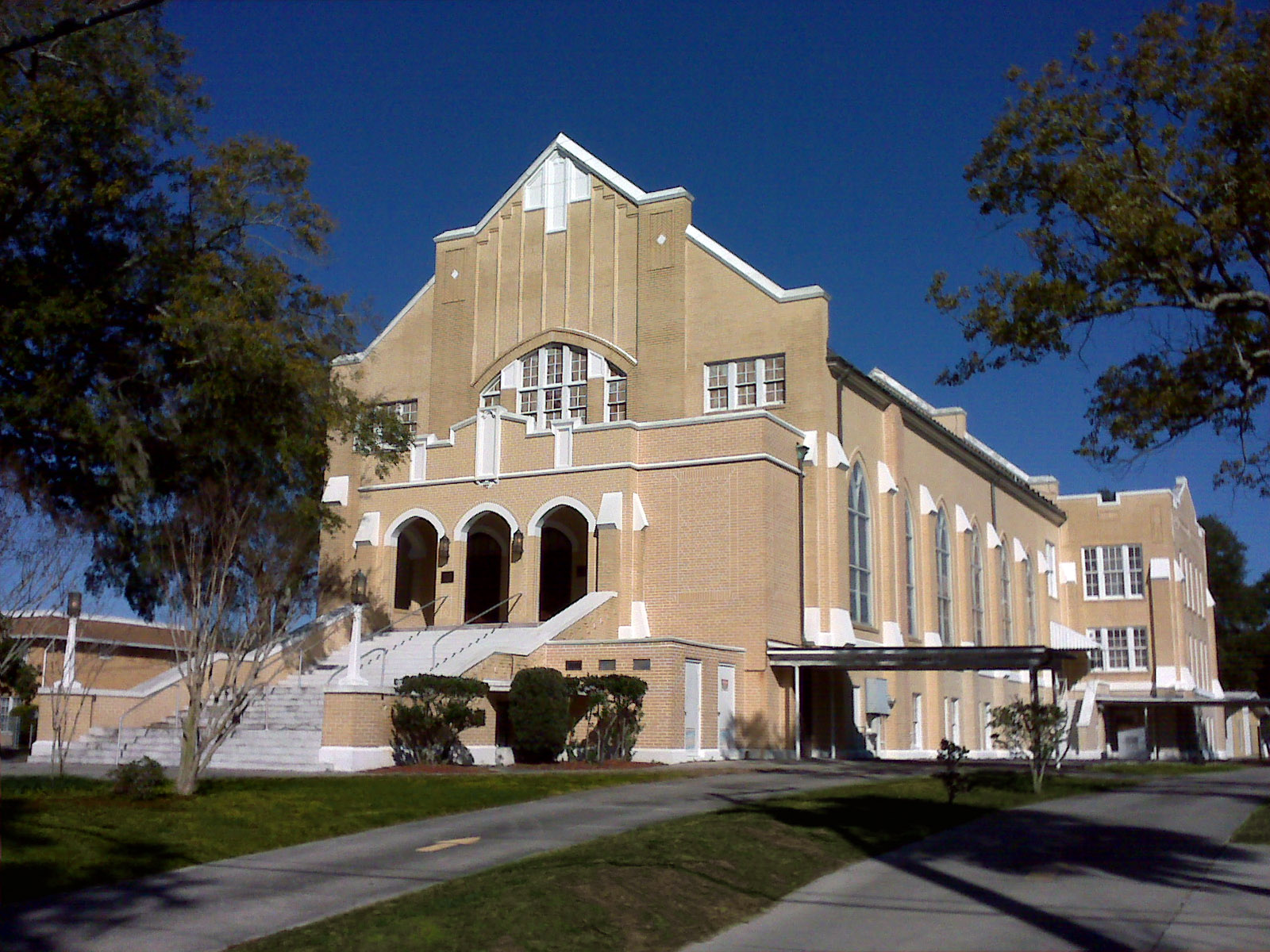
Seminole Heights Methodist Church

In addition to its status at the national level, Seminole Heights Historic District was declared a Local Historic District by the City of Tampa Architectural Review Commission on March 16, 1995. It is one of four Local Historic Districts within the city, and the only one in Seminole Heights. Local district boundaries cover the same area defined by the national district, between Hanna and Osborne Avenues, and Florida and Cherokee Avenues/I-275. Unlike the rough pattern followed by the national district, the local boundaries are absolute, thus including a slightly larger area and approximately 26 additional historic buildings. The Local District adds a second area east of I-275 which is bounded north to south by Henry and Hillsborough Avenues, and by the properties on both sides of Miami Avenue in the east to Taliaferro Avenue in the west. Approximately 28 historic structures are included in this smaller addition.
