= River Grove (disambiguation) =

River Grove may refer to:

- River Grove (Tampa), a neighborhood within the City of Tampa, Florida, United States
- River Grove, Illinois, a village in Illinois, United States
  - River Grove station
- Rivergrove, Oregon, a city in Oregon, United States
