= Belmont Heights =

Belmont Heights may refer to:

- Belmont Heights, Long Beach, California, a neighborhood
- Belmont Heights, Tampa, a neighborhood in East Tampa, Florida
