= Woodland Terrace =

- Neighborhood
- Location within the state of Florida
- Coordinates: 28°0′20″N 82°25′14″W
- Country: United States
- State: Florida
- County: Hillsborough
- City: Tampa

Population (2000)
  - Total: 959
- Time zone: UTC-5 (Eastern (EST))
  - Summer (DST): UTC-4 (EDT)
- ZIP codes: 813

Woodland Terrace is a neighborhood within the city limits of Tampa, Florida. As of the 2000 census the neighborhood had a population of 959. The ZIP Code serving the neighborhood is 33610.

== Geography ==
Woodland Terrace boundaries are Live Oaks Square to the south, Northeast Community to the east, 30th Street to the west, and River Grove to the north.

== Demographics ==
Source: Hillsborough County Atlas

At the 2010 census there were 858 people living in the neighborhood. The population density was 1,133/mi^{2}. The racial makeup of the neighborhood was 8% White, 89% African American, 0% Native American, 0% Asian, 1% from other races, and 2% from two or more races. Hispanic or Latino of any race were 9%.

Of the 343 households 38% had children under the age of 18 living with them, 41% were married couples living together, 30% had a female householder with no husband present, and 2% were non-families. 22% of households were made up of individuals.

The age distribution was 30% under the age of 18, 19% from 18 to 34, 20% from 35 to 49, 17% from 50 to 64, and 17% 65 or older. For every 100 females, there were 75.3 males.

The per capita income for the neighborhood was $16,699. About 15% of the population were below the poverty line, 35% of those are under the age of 18.

== Transportation ==
The community is served primarily by three HARTline bus lines:

- Line 5 - Downtown Tampa to U.A.T.C. (via 40th Street)
- Line 18 - Downtown Tampa to U.A.T.C. (via 30th Street)
- Line 41 - Netpark to Hanley/Waters Plaza (via 30th Street and Hanna Avenue)

== See also ==
- Neighborhoods in Tampa, Florida
