= South Seminole Heights =

- Neighborhood
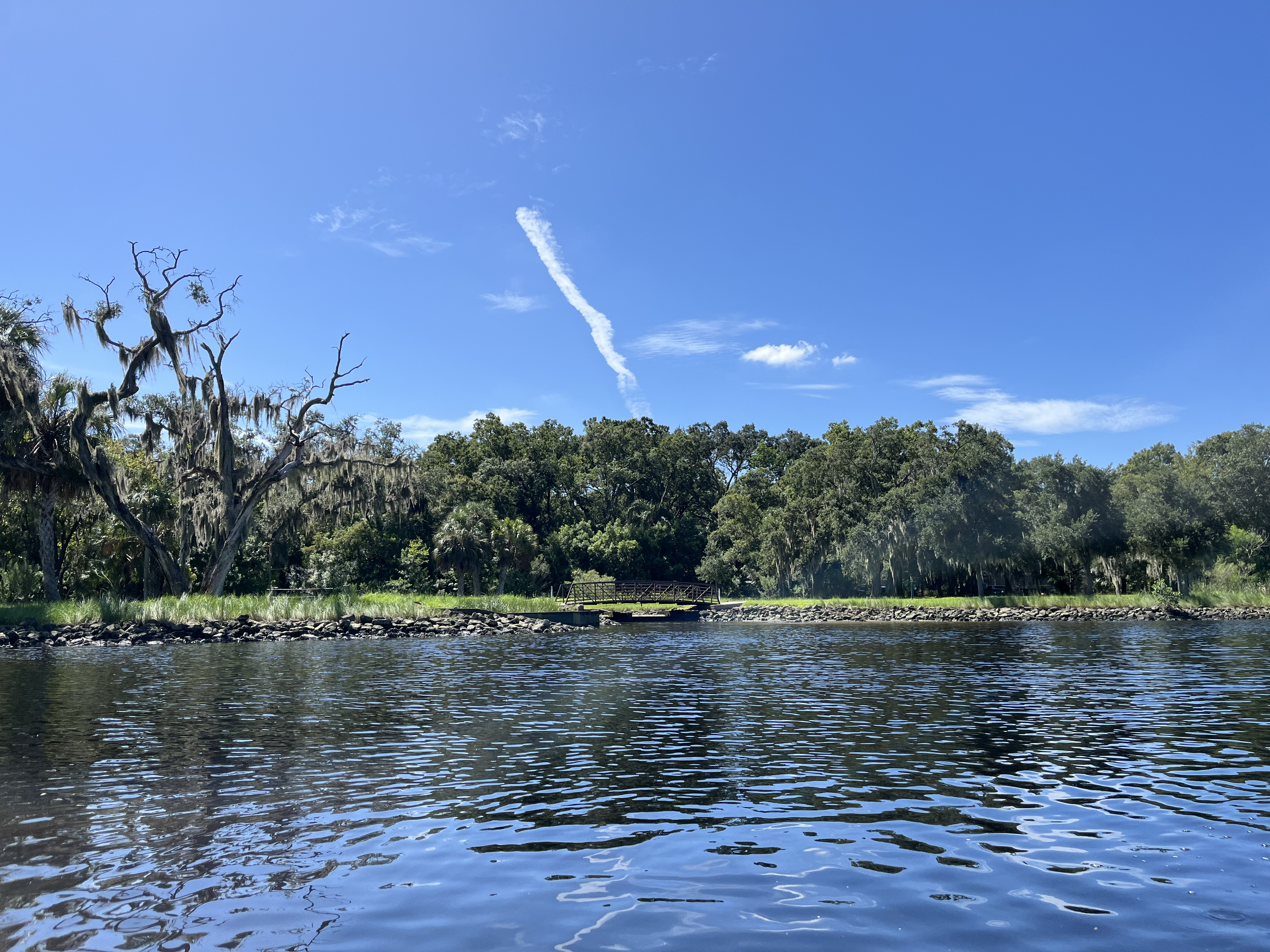

- Location within the state of Florida
- Coordinates: 27°59′19″N 82°27′53″W
- Country: United States
- State: Florida
- County: Hillsborough
- City: Tampa

Population (2000)
  - Total: 3,177
- Time zone: UTC-5 (Eastern (EST))
  - Summer (DST): UTC-4 (EDT)
- ZIP codes: 33603
- Area code: 813

South Seminole Heights is a neighborhood within the city limits of Tampa, Florida. As of the 2000 census the neighborhood had a population of 3,177. The ZIP Code serving the area is 33603.

== Geography ==
South Seminole Heights boundaries are Florida Avenue to the east, Hillsborough River to the west, Dr. Martin Luther King Jr. Boulevard to the south, and Hillsborough Avenue to the north. The neighborhood is located in the southwestern edge of the Seminole Heights district.

== Demographics ==
Source: Hillsborough County Atlas

At the 2000 census there were 3,177 people and 1,351 households residing in the neighborhood. The population density was 5,250/mi^{2}. The racial makeup of the neighborhood was 71.0% White, 15.0% African American, 0.0% Native American, 2.0% Asian, 8.0% from other races, and 4.0% from two or more races. Hispanic or Latino of any race were about 23.0%.

Of the 1,351 households 30% had children under the age of 18 living with them, 40% were married couples living together, 10% had a female householder with no husband present, and 12% non-families. 31% of households were made up of individuals.

The age distribution was 25% under the age of 18, 28% from 18 to 34, 26% from 35 to 49, 13% from 50 to 64, and 9% 65 or older. For every 100 females, there were 100 males.

The per capita income for the neighborhood was $15,263. About 28% of the population were below the poverty line. Of those, none are under the age of 18.

== See also ==
- Seminole Heights
- Neighborhoods in Tampa, Florida
