= River Grove (Tampa) =

- Neighborhood
- Location within the state of Florida
- Coordinates: 28°0′27″N 82°25′15″W
- Country: United States
- State: Florida
- County: Hillsborough
- City: Tampa

Population (2000)
  - Total: 949
- Time zone: UTC-5 (Eastern (EST))
  - Summer (DST): UTC-4 (EDT)
- ZIP codes: 33604 and 33610
- Area code: 813

River Grove (or Rivergrove) is a neighborhood within the city limits of Tampa, Florida. It along with Woodland Terrace and Live Oaks Square are commonly referred to by residents as Comanche, a name derived from a street that goes through the neighborhoods. As of the 2000 census the neighborhood had a population of 949. The ZIP Codes serving the neighborhood are 33604 and 33610.

== Geography ==
River Grove boundaries are Hillsborough River to the north, Woodland Terrace to the south, 30th Street to the west, and Northeast Community to the east.

== Demographics ==
Source: Hillsborough County Atlas

As of the census of 2010, there were 901 people living in the neighborhood. The population density was 5,020/mi^{2}. The racial makeup of the neighborhood was 12% White, 84% African American, 0% Native American, 0% Asian, 1% from other races, and 2% from two or more races. Hispanic or Latino of any race were 12% of the population.

There were 369 households, out of which 34% had children under the age of 18 living with them, 33% were married couples living together, 30% had a female householder with no husband present, and 1% were non-families. 31% of all households were made up of individuals.

In the neighborhood the population was spread out, with 29% under the age of 18, 20% from 18 to 34, 20% from 35 to 49, 16% from 50 to 64, and 16% who were 65 years of age or older. For every 100 females, there were 73.6 males.

The per capita income for the neighborhood was $15,568. About 18% of the population were below the poverty line, 28% of those under age 18.

== See also ==
- Neighborhoods in Tampa, Florida
