= McKay Bay =

Northeastern corner of Tampa Bay, Florida

Coordinates: 27.9378°N 82.4236°W

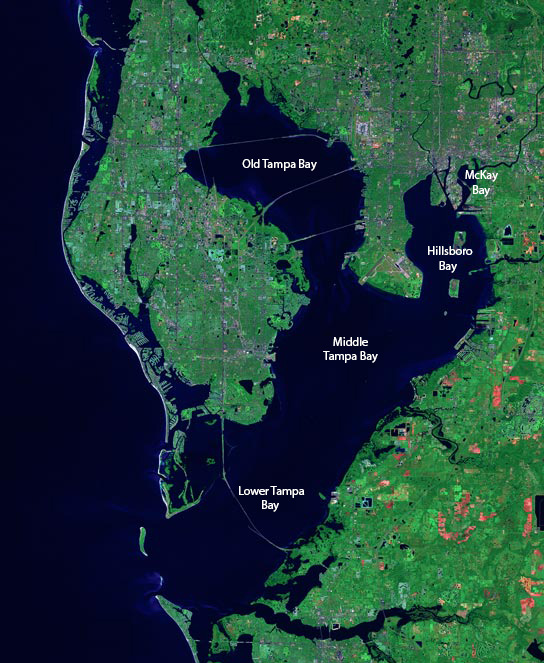
Map of Tampa Bay

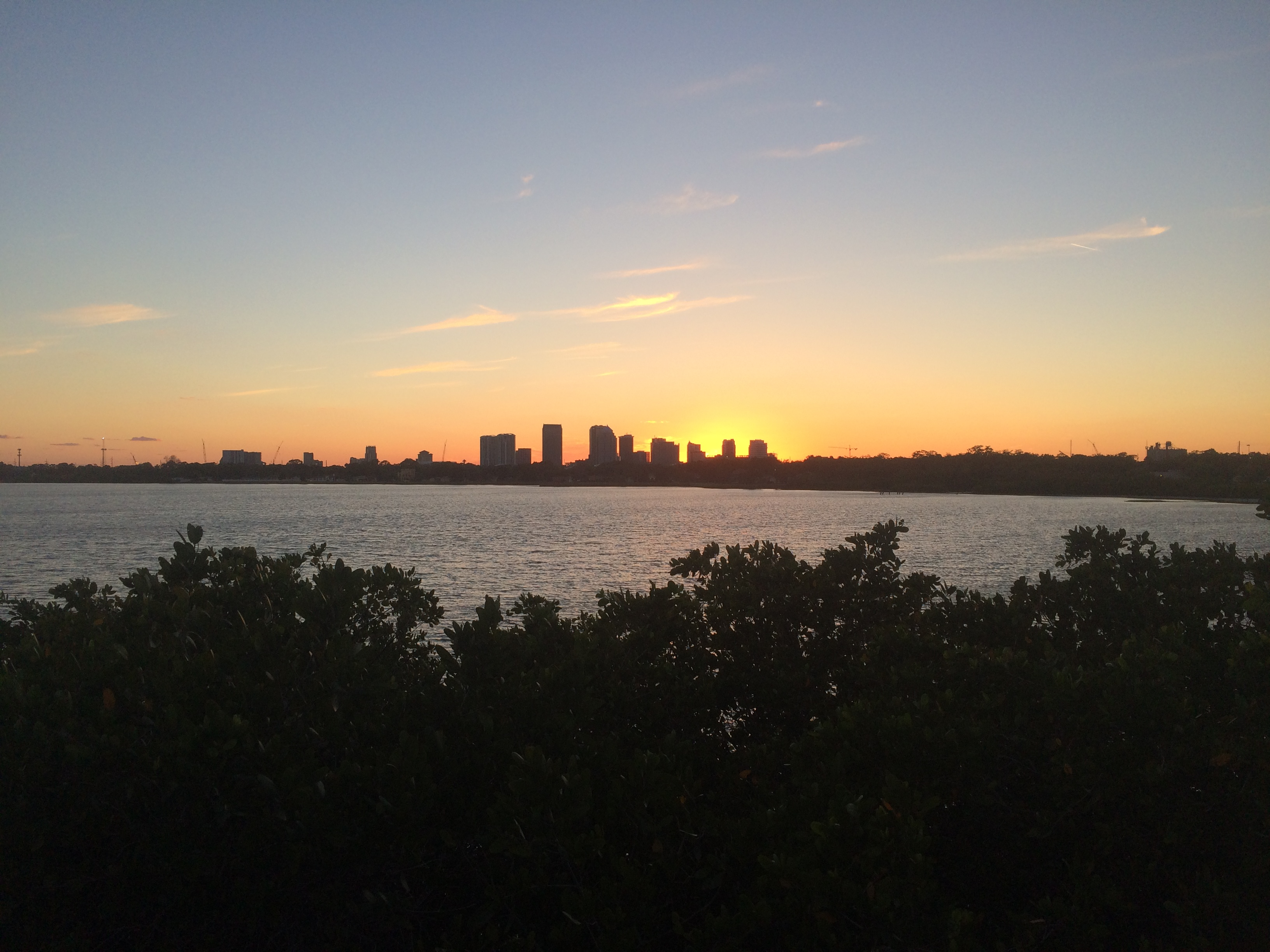
Looking west at dusk across McKay Bay towards downtown Tampa

McKay Bay is the northeastern most arm of Tampa Bay, a large estuary on Florida's west coast. McKay Bay is brackish and shallow with the exception of a dredged shipping channel connecting key port facilities of Tampa, Florida to the rest of the bay. It is named after James McKay Sr., an early mayor of Tampa and the father and grandfather of later mayors.

Historically, McKay Bay was much wider and very shallow, with broad muddy salt marshes that were submerged at high tide. As Tampa grew and the shipping industry became a key component of the local economy in the early 20th century, city officials, developers, and shipping interests dramatically altered Tampa Bay and McKay Bay in particular. From the 1920s through the 1950s, at least half of its former expanse was filled with dredged materials to expand Hooker's Point and increase the available land for warehouses and other shipping facilities at Port Tampa Bay. The outlet to the rest of Tampa Bay was also narrowed considerably, and McKay Bay's main source of fresh water, Six Mile Creek, was turned into a flood control canal for the Hillsborough River, severely impacting the environment.

Since the 1990s, Tampa's city government along with other governmental and non-profit organizations have made efforts to improve water quality and restore coastal habitat in and around McKay Bay. Some shorelines were restored, water circulation improved, and mangroves planted to encourage the return of coastal wetlands. At low tide, parts of McKay Bay are again a feeding ground for migratory waterfowl, shorebirds and wading birds, including American avocet, black-necked stilts, black skimmers, pelicans, Northern shovelers, canvasbacks, green-winged teals, ruddy ducks, and glossy ibis.

Near the shore are the McKay Bay Greenway, which runs through the area on the east side of McKay Bay and connects to the Tampa Bypass Canal, and McKay Bay Nature Park, a 38-acre city facility featuring park a boardwalk, nature trails, and an observation tower that doubles as an education pavilion. The area is part of the Great Florida Birding Trail.

The area also includes the McKay Bay Resource Recovery Plant, a waste-to-energy plant that burns much of Tampa's solid waste to generate electricity.
