= Seminole Heights United Methodist Church =

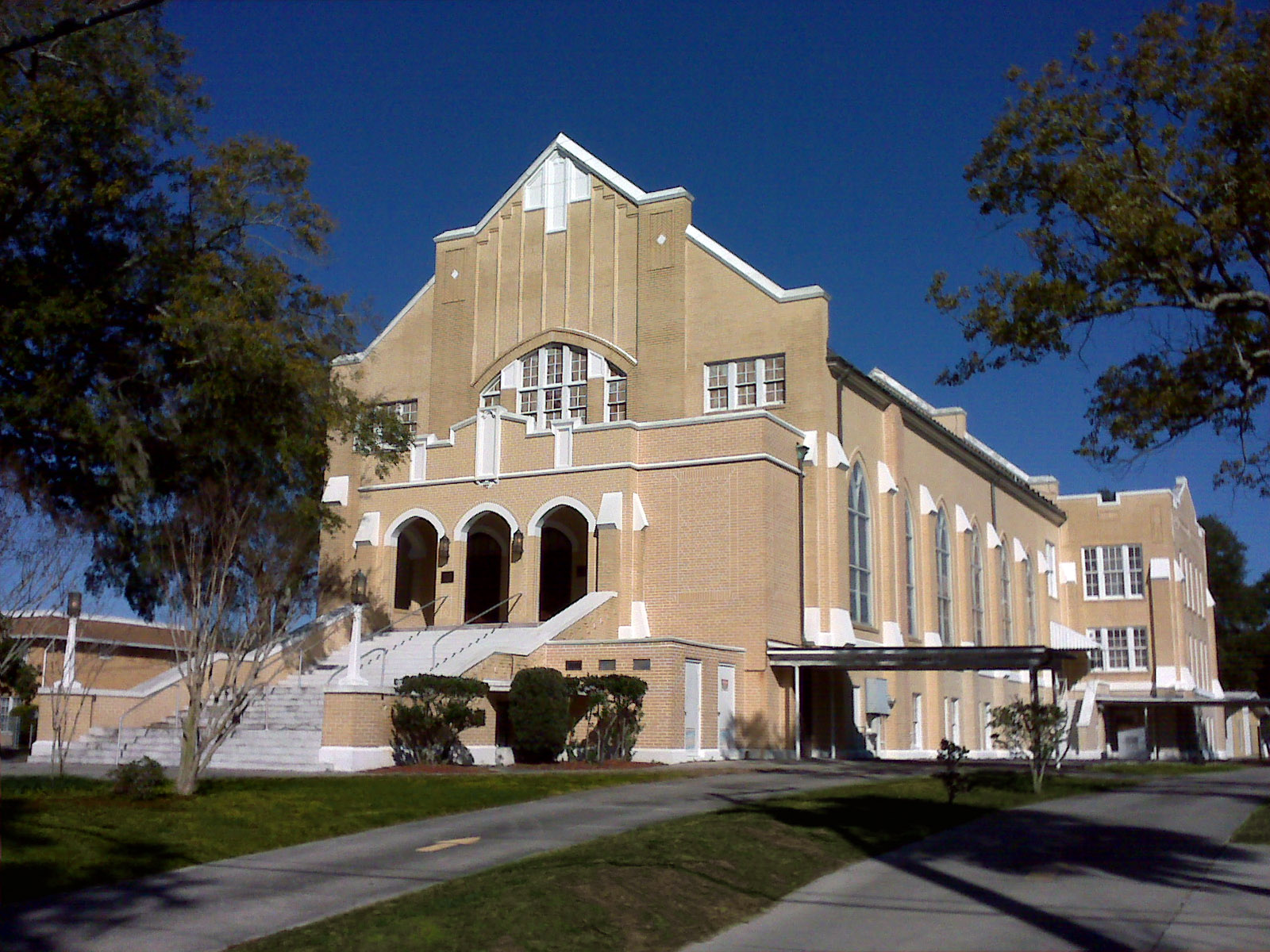

Religion
- Affiliation: United Methodist Church
- District: Gulf Central District
- Province: Southeastern Jurisdiction
- Leadership: Rev. Nicki Taylor, Pastor
- Status: Active church

Location
- Location: 6111 North Central Avenue, Tampa, Florida
- Interactive map of Seminole Heights; United Methodist Church
- Territory: Florida Annual Conference

Website
- www.semheights.com
- Seminole Heights United Methodist Church
- U.S. Historic district – Contributing property
- Location within Florida Location within the United States
- Coordinates: 28°0′10″N 82°27′17″W
- Built: 1927
- Architect: Frank A. Winn, Jr.
- Part of: Seminole Heights Residential District (ID93000751)
- Designated CP: August 5, 1993

Seminole Heights United Methodist Church, also referred to as Seminole Heights Methodist or Seminole Heights UMC, is an active Methodist congregation and a historic, Gothic Revival style church building constructed in 1927 in the Old Seminole Heights neighborhood of Tampa, Florida. The building is one of the contributing structures within the Seminole Heights Residential District, a U.S. National and Local Historic District. Seminole Heights United Methodist Church is located at 6111 Central Avenue, at the southeast corner of the intersection of Central and Hanna Avenues.

== Architecture ==
The site where the church is located was originally the site of Seminole Heights Elementary School. The school would eventually be relocated to its present campus directly across Hanna Avenue, which cleared the way for construction of a church facility on the school's former lot. Aside from being very close in age and location, Seminole Heights' namesake Elementary School and Methodist Church buildings also share in common their primary building material, yellow brick.

The sanctuary was designed by one of the highly regarded architects of Tampa, Frank A. Winn, Jr. Winn is responsible for several prominent area structures, some of which have been recognized individually by the National Register of Historic Places. The Old Lutz Schoolhouse is one such example. In 1927, the year Seminole Heights Methodist Church was built, the Methodist Church in nearby Tampa Heights completed a three-story Sunday school building, also designed by Winn.

Winn chose to design the Seminole Heights Methodist Church in Gothic Revival style. Today, the value of Frank Winn's design, as contributed by Seminole Heights United Methodist Church, is one reason why Gothic Revival is one of the architectural styles for which Seminole Heights Residential District is recognized.

From the front of the building, a tiered stairway ascends to the main floor where a portico with three arched openings precedes the main entry. Inside, the sanctuary is expansive and open, lit on either side by twelve towering stained glass windows. Between each window and along each corner the building is supported by buttress-like exterior pilasters. The elevated main floor allows for a lookout-style basement ("Allen Hall") below, a rare feature for local architecture. The yellow brick masonry is accented with white cast concrete detailing, and the building is topped by a steeply pitched gable roof.

== Function ==
=== Church ===
The congregation of Seminole Heights United Methodist is an active church within the Florida Annual Conference of the United Methodist Church, a Protestant Christian denomination. Its members meet for worship services each Sunday, with additional meetings during the week for Bible study, youth and children's programs, music rehearsals, and congregational dinners. Seminole Heights UMC sponsors special events throughout the year, such as outdoor movie nights, flea markets, craft bazaars, and church conferences, in addition to seasonal events such as an Easter Egg hunt, a pumpkin patch in the fall, and several community events around Christmas. The church also operates a pre-school and day care from an adjacent building to the rear of the historic sanctuary.

=== Community space ===
In addition to its capacity as a religious house, the building plays host to community-organized events. Seminole Heights Elementary School uses the sanctuary for annual concerts. The building is also the site of regular meetings by Twelve-Step groups and community organizations such as the Old Seminole Heights Neighborhood Association, which regularly uses the church building for its general membership meetings.
