= Del Rio, Florida =

- Unincorporated community
- Location within Florida Location within the United States
- Coordinates: 28°00′33″N 82°23′59″W
- Country: United States
- State: Florida
- County: Hillsborough
- Elevation: 46 ft (14 m)
- Time zone: UTC-5 (Eastern (EST))
  - Summer (DST): UTC-4 (EDT)
- ZIP codes: 33617
- Area code: 813
- GNIS feature ID: 1867134

Del Rio is an unincorporated, urban community in Hillsborough County, Florida, United States. It lies between Tampa and Temple Terrace, near the Hillsborough River.

The community is known as "The Fishbowl" to locals because many streets in the area are named for fish. Del Rio is included within the East Lake-Orient Park census-designated place.

== Description ==
Historical population
Census	Pop.	Note	%±
1980	7,409		—
1990	8,248		11.3%

Tampa bounds Del Rio to the west, the Hillsborough River to the north, U.S. Route 92 to the south, and 56th Street (SR 583) to the east. The 40th Street Bridge on County Road 585A travels over the Hillsborough River in Del Rio.

== History ==
Del Rio was a purpose-built community created in the 1950s and 1960s as one of the suburbs of Tampa. The community multiplied during the 1960s and 1970s. Its peak population according to the Census was 8,248 in 1990. It is a part of the Northeast Community.

== Schools serving the area ==
- Robles Elementary School
- C. Leon King High School
