= Connerton, Florida =

- Census-designated place
- Location in Pasco County and the state of Florida
- Coordinates: 28°18′09″N 82°27′45″W
- Country: United States
- State: Florida
- County: Pasco

Area
  - Total: 13.34 sq mi (34.54 km^{2})
  - Land: 12.95 sq mi (33.54 km^{2})
  - Water: 0.39 sq mi (1.00 km^{2})
- Elevation: 75 ft (23 m)

Population (2020)
  - Total: 5,282
  - Density: 407.9/sq mi (157.49/km^{2})
- Time zone: UTC-5 (Eastern (EST))
  - Summer (DST): UTC-4 (EDT)
- Area code: 813
- GNIS feature ID: 2583337

Connerton is a census-designated place in Pasco County, Florida, United States, off U.S. 41. Its population was 5,282 as of the 2020 census.

== History ==
The Conner family owned and operated Conner Ranch, a working cattle ranch set on the 8,000 acres that now makes up Connerton. The family sold the land in early 2000 to a developer who originally planned to build more than 15,000 homes and up to three golf courses. The original plan was later modified to protect much of the natural lands. Development began a couple years later with the first homes being sold in 2005. The development was stunted with the downturn in the housing market after a small portion of the full scale residential development was built out. As of 2012 construction plans were once again moving ahead.In 2019, Lennar Homes became the majority land owner in Connerton after purchasing the remaining undeveloped land for $26 million.

== Demographics ==
Historical population
Census	Pop.	Note	%±
2020	5,282		—
U.S. Decennial Census

Connerton first appeared as a census designated place in the 2010 U.S. census.

=== 2020 census ===
As of the 2020 census, Connerton had a population of 5,282. The median age was 34.3 years. 26.7% of residents were under the age of 18 and 7.4% of residents were 65 years of age or older. For every 100 females there were 121.6 males, and for every 100 females age 18 and over there were 127.0 males age 18 and over.

69.1% of residents lived in urban areas, while 30.9% lived in rural areas.

There were 1,160 households in Connerton, of which 54.7% had children under the age of 18 living in them. Of all households, 74.5% were married-couple households, 7.8% were households with a male householder and no spouse or partner present, and 12.1% were households with a female householder and no spouse or partner present. About 9.4% of all households were made up of individuals and 4.2% had someone living alone who was 65 years of age or older.

There were 1,218 housing units, of which 4.8% were vacant. The homeowner vacancy rate was 1.7% and the rental vacancy rate was 14.1%.

Racial composition as of the 2020 census
Race	Number	Percent
White	3,853	72.9%
Black or African American	438	8.3%
American Indian and Alaska Native	6	0.1%
Asian	183	3.5%
Native Hawaiian and Other Pacific Islander	3	0.1%
Some other race	212	4.0%
Two or more races	587	11.1%
Hispanic or Latino (of any race)	887	16.8%
