= Wesley Chapel South, Florida =

- Unincorporated community
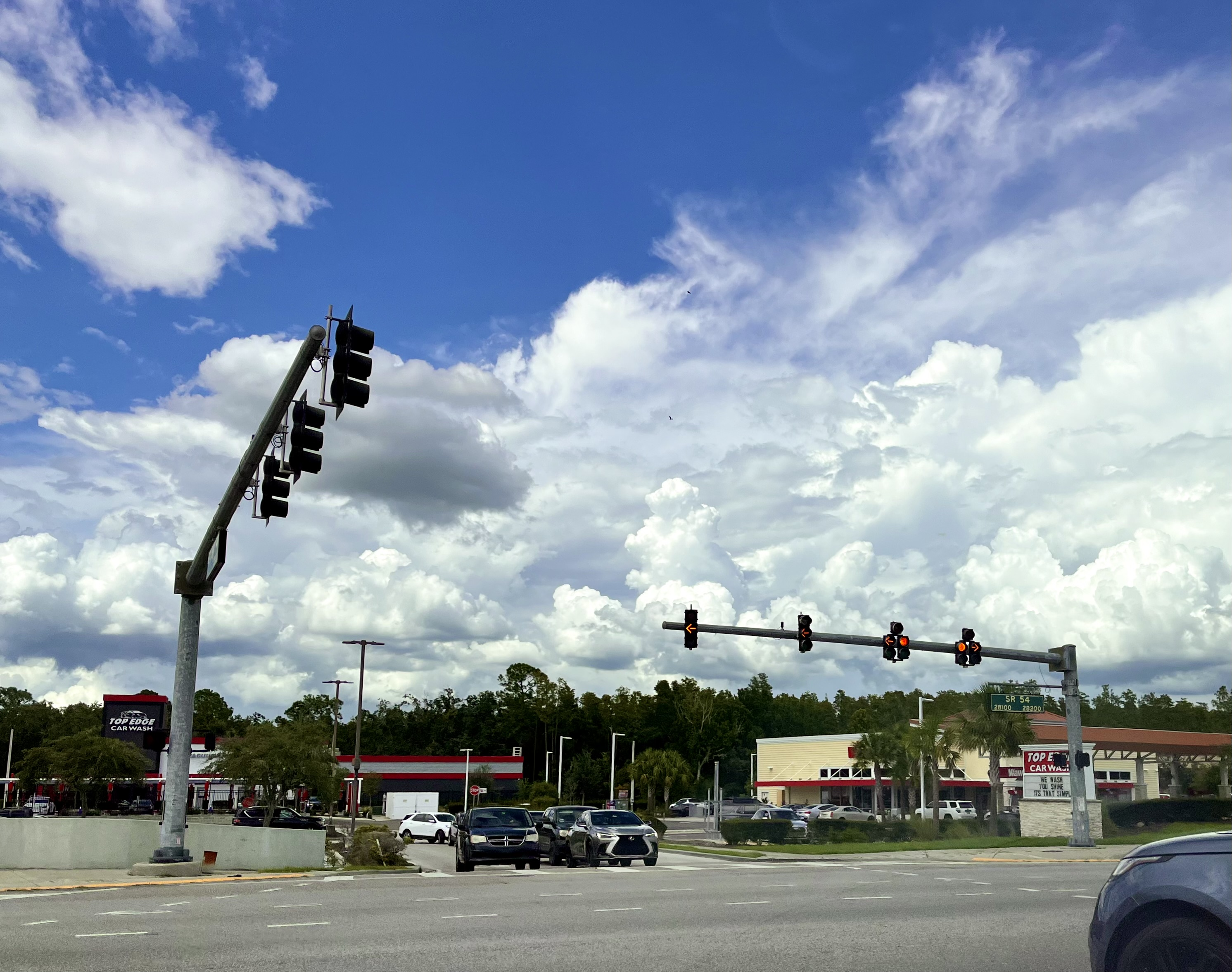

- Location in Pasco County and the state of Florida
- Coordinates: 28°14′49″N 82°19′02″W
- Country: United States
- State: Florida
- County: Pasco

Area
  - Total: 11.2 sq mi (28.9 km^{2})
  - Land: 11.1 sq mi (28.8 km^{2})
  - Water: 0.039 sq mi (0.1 km^{2})
- Elevation: 92 ft (28 m)

Population (2000)
  - Total: 3,245
  - Density: 291/sq mi (112.3/km^{2})
- Time zone: UTC-5 (Eastern (EST))
  - Summer (DST): UTC-4 (EDT)
- FIPS code: 12-75887
- GNIS feature ID: 2402997

Wesley Chapel South is an unincorporated community in Pasco County, Florida, United States. The population was 3,245 at the 2000 census.

== Geography ==
Wesley Chapel South is actually north of its namesake.

According to the United States Census Bureau, the CDP has a total area of 11.2 square miles (28.9 km^{2}), of which 11.1 square miles (28.8 km^{2}) is land and 0.04 square mile (0.1 km^{2}) (0.27%) is water.

== Demographics ==
As of the 2000 census, there were 3,245 people, 1,264 households, and 968 families residing in the CDP. The population density was 291.5 inhabitants per square mile (112.5/km^{2}). There were 1,508 housing units at an average density of 135.5 per square mile (52.3/km^{2}). The racial makeup of the CDP was 93.16% White, 1.45% African American, 0.55% Native American, 1.85% Asian, 0.99% from other races, and 2.00% from two or more races. Hispanic or Latino of any race were 6.35% of the population.

There were 1,264 households, out of which 32.1% had children under the age of 18 living with them, 66.1% were married couples living together, 6.4% had a female householder with no husband present, and 23.4% were non-families. 17.5% of all households were made up of individuals, and 5.0% had someone living alone who was 65 years of age or older. The average household size was 2.57 and the average family size was 2.90.

In the CDP, the population was spread out, with 23.2% under the age of 18, 5.4% from 18 to 24, 30.8% from 25 to 44, 29.1% from 45 to 64, and 11.5% who were 65 years of age or older. The median age was 40 years. For every 100 females, there were 100.1 males. For every 100 females age 18 and over, there were 99.8 males.

The median income for a household in the CDP was $53,828, and the median income for a family was $60,481. Males had a median income of $41,188 versus $30,864 for females. The per capita income for the CDP was $31,399. About 5.5% of families and 6.6% of the population were below the poverty line, including 3.2% of those under age 18 and 7.8% of those age 65 or over.
