= Seminole Heights =

- Interactive map of Seminole Heights
- Coordinates: 28.001131°N 82.454487°W
- Country: United States
- State: Florida
- County: Hillsborough
- City: Tampa
- Founded: 1911

Population (2000 census)
  - Total: 24,567
- Time zone: UTC-5 (Eastern)
  - Summer (DST): UTC-4 (Eastern)

Seminole Heights is a historic neighborhood and district located in central Tampa. It is bounded on the west by Florida Avenue, on the north by Hanna Avenue, on the east by Interstate 275 and on the south by Osborne Avenue. It includes many early 20th century bungalow homes and historic buildings. It was an early residential area of Tampa connected by streetcar. The area had an economic downturn in the late 20th century marked by increased crime, but has since seen a resurgence with new restaurants, brew pubs and independent businesses opening up. The neighborhood's historic homes, eclectic shops and gourmet restaurants are an increasing draw.. Until recently, Seminole Heights had a reputation as a gay neighborhood/gay village. Since then, it has undergone gentrification.

As of the 2000 census, the district had a population of 24,567.

== Description ==
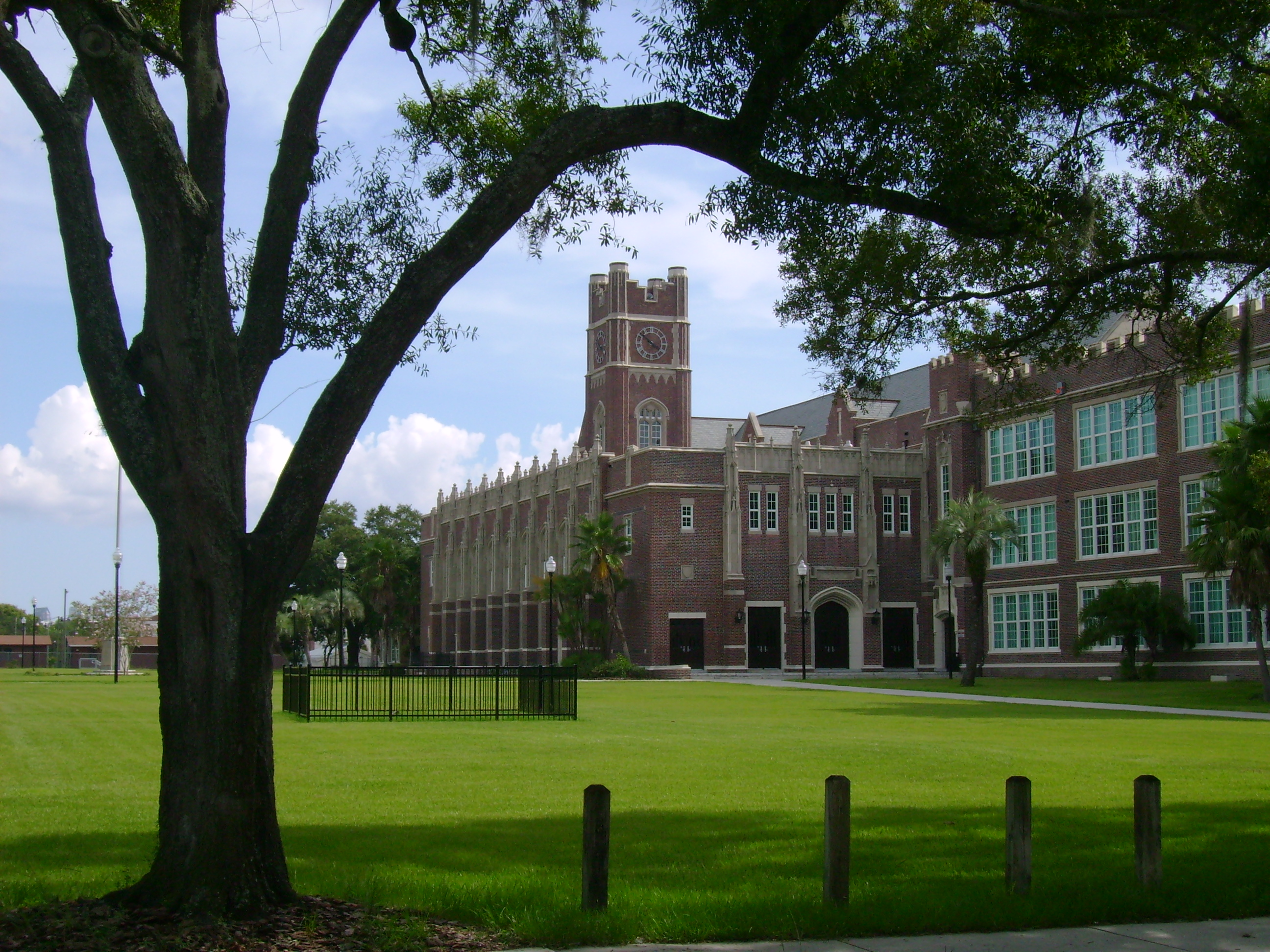
Gothic Style Hillsborough High School in Old Seminole Heights was built in 1927

Homes on Central Ave

Seminole Heights is known for its historic craftsman style bungalows from the early 20th century. Many buildings in the neighborhood existed in the early 1900s, including the Seminole Heights Methodist Church, Seminole Heights Elementary School, Broward Elementary, Hillsborough High School, and St. Paul Lutheran Church. The Seminole Heights Garden Center, a neighborhood park, is used for community events such as art festivals and picnics. Seminole Heights has the longest stretch of Riverfront parkland in the city of Tampa. Rivercrest, Epps, and several pocket parks provide access to the Hillsborough River.

In recent years Seminole Heights has experienced rising property values and a decrease in crime. The area is popular among young professionals and their families who are seeking an alternative to master planned communities. The area contains two designated historical districts including Seminole Heights (local and national designation) and Hampton Terrace (national designation). Seminole Heights is considered gentrified, although it had a local status as an LGBT village.

In 2003, Southeast Seminole Heights was named Best Neighborhood in America by Neighborhoods, USA (NUSA).

In July 2009, This Old House magazine ranked Seminole Heights among the best places to buy an old house for: families, green thumbs, cottages and bungalows, single women homebuyers, porch sitters, walkers, and the south. Overall, Seminole Heights was in the top eight of editors picks.

In 2014, Seminole Heights made international headlines when a "local naturalist" sent a picture of a two headed alligator to a local newspaper, which ran the image as its cover story. The alligator was allegedly captured by local trappers and taxidermied for display at Ella's Folkart Cafe. The authenticity of the creature has often come under question. Since the story in 2014, it has been the subject of art murals, flags, tee-shirts and other ephemera related to the neighborhood.

In 2016, the creature made news again when the community art project, Urban Art Attack, funded the building of a two headed alligator statue on Nebraska Ave.

== History ==
Seminole Heights was born in 1911. T. Roy Young had 40 acres (160,000 m^{2}) to develop Tampa's first suburb three miles (5 km) north of downtown. He called it Seminole Heights.

Ten years earlier Tampa's population had reached 26,000. A trolley line connected Sulphur Springs to downtown, making travel to the suburbs possible and inviting. The streetcar made it possible to live in one area of town and work in another.

Young recognized this potential. His Seminole Development Corporation property encompassed a rectangle bordered by Hillsborough Avenue, Central Avenue, Wilder Avenue and Florida Avenue. The houses built here were mostly bungalow, oriented east-to-west and started at $5,000.

Other developments quickly followed. By 1912, the Mutual Development Company owned by Milton and Giddings Mabry and the Dekle Investment Company owned by Lee and James Dekle surveyed and platted land adjacent to Seminole Heights forming the Suwanee Heights subdivision. Bounded by Henry Avenue, Hillsborough Avenue, Central Avenue and Florida Avenue, Suwanee Heights was also a restricted subdivision. Like the original Seminole Heights, houses required the same east–west orientation but started at $1,400.

During the "Florida Bloom" years (roughly 1919–1929), more development came to areas north and east of the original subdivisions. Of course, with this development came the merchants seeing an opportunity to provide welcome goods and services to the residents. Some of those early businesses have faded away. However, many current Seminole Heights businesses have been open for more than 50 years.

In 2017 the area had the Seminole Heights serial killer.

== Areas ==
The Greater Seminole Heights District covers a larger area. The west and north boundaries extend to the Hillsborough River; the east boundary extends to 22nd St; and the south boundary extends to Hillsborough Avenue, and further to Martin Luther King Jr. Blvd on the west side of 15th St.

The greater Seminole Heights area has a resident population 23,141 living in 9,433 households as of 2009. The median household income is $47,817. The median age is 37. The area is projected to grow 5.89% during 2009–2014. 47% of the population has some college level education or higher. Seventy percent 70% of the homes are owner occupied. (Source:SiteReports.com)

Seminole Heights consists of three distinct neighborhoods:

- Old Seminole Heights (pop. 15,062)
- South Seminole Heights (pop. 3,160)
- Southeast Seminole Heights (pop. 3,384)

source for population figures: The Planning Commission

== Education ==
Schools within Seminole Heights include:

- Cleveland Elementary
- Hillsborough High School - Website
- Broward Elementary
- Edison Elementary
- Seminole Elementary
- Memorial Middle School
- Pepin Academies

== See also ==
- Hampton Terrace Historic District
- Seminole Heights Residential District
- Riverside Heights
- Tampa Heights
- West Tampa
