= Jackson Heights, Tampa =

Jackson Heights
- Neighborhood
- Location within the state of Florida
- Coordinates: 27°51′19″N 82°30′35″W
- Country: United States
- State: Florida
- County: Hillsborough
- City: Tampa
- Time zone: UTC-5 (Eastern (EST))
  - Summer (DST): UTC-4 (EDT)

Jackson Heights is a neighborhood within the district of East Tampa, which represents District 5 of the Tampa City Council. Demographically, The neighborhood did not report separately. Jackson Heights boundaries are roughly 40th Street to the east, Hillsborough Avenue to the north, and 30th Street to the west.

== See also ==
- East Tampa
