= Hampton Terrace Historic District =

Historic district in Florida, United States

- U.S. National Register of Historic Places
- U.S. Historic district
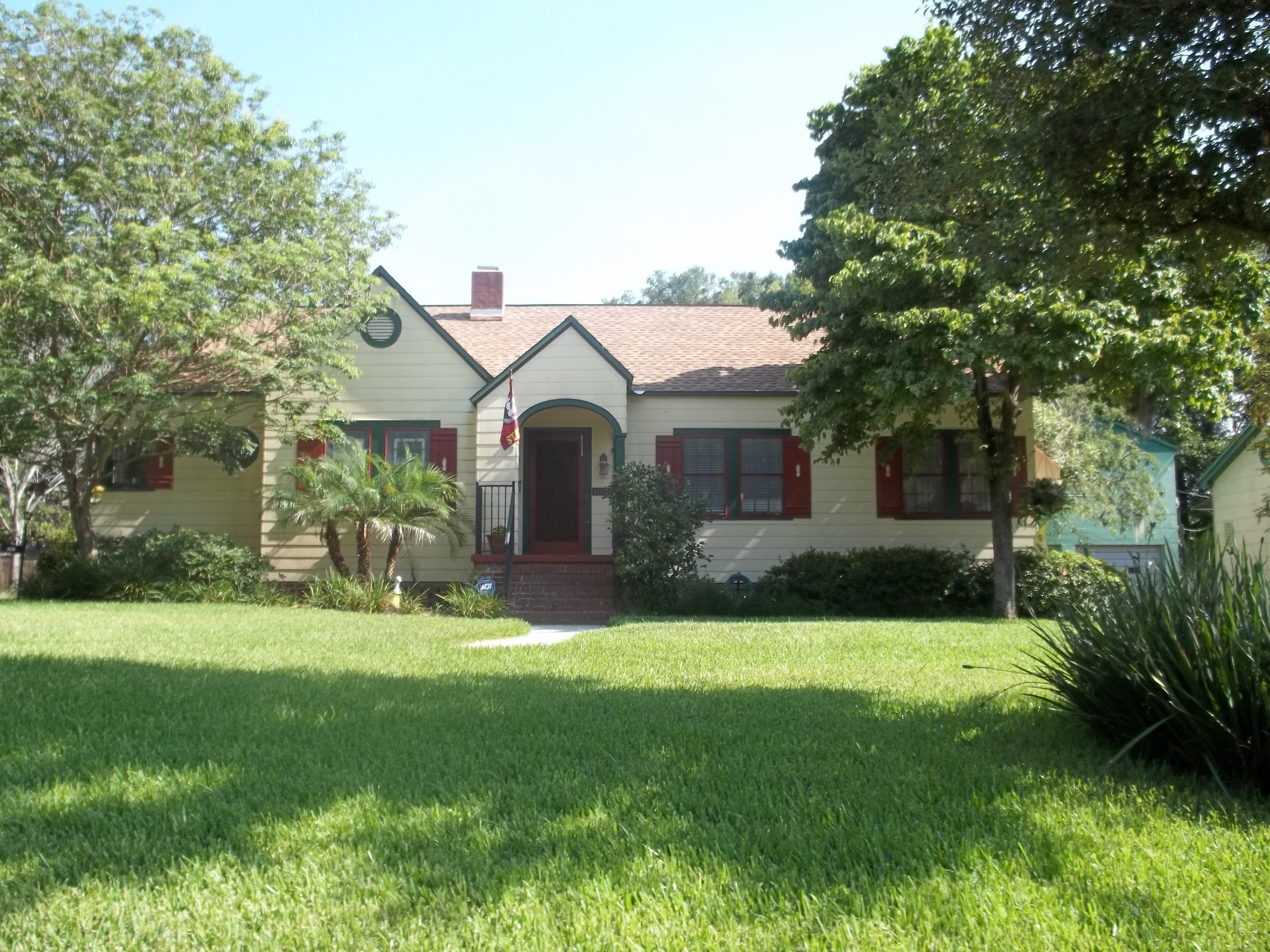

- Location within Florida Location within the United States
- Location: Roughly bounded by Hanna Ave., 15th St., Hillsborough Ave., and Nebraska Ave., Tampa, Florida
- Coordinates: 27°59′58″N 82°26′50″W
- Area: 115 acres (47 ha)
- Architectural style: Bungalow/Craftsman
- NRHP reference No.: 99000045
- Added to NRHP: January 27, 1999

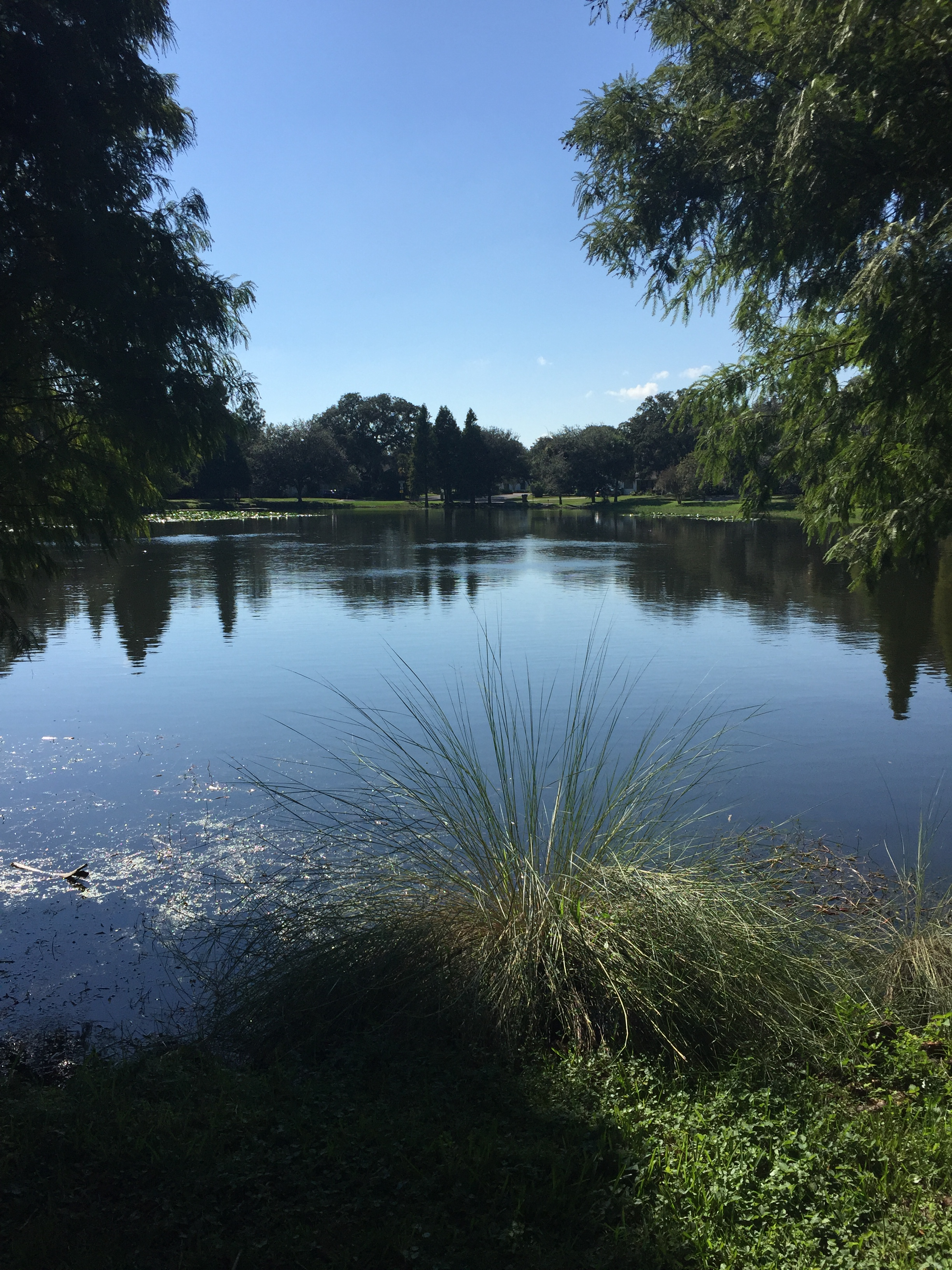
Lake Roberta, within the historic district.

The Hampton Terrace Historic District, originally called the Lakewood Manor Subdivision, is a U.S. historic district located in the Old Seminole Heights neighborhood of Tampa, Florida. The district is roughly bounded by Hanna Avenue to the north, 15th Street to the east, Nebraska Avenue to the west, and Hillsborough Avenue to the south. Hampton Terrace Historic District was so designated by its inclusion in the National Register of Historic Places on January 27, 1999.

The Hampton Terrace district encompasses 1,150 acres (4.7 km^{2}), and the neighborhood's boundaries are Hanna Ave, 15th St, Hillsborough Ave, and Nebraska, and includes Lake Roberta. The area contains about 470 contributing structures, all of which are private residences. The structures are considered historically significant examples of residential styles like the bungalow, and architectural influences including American Craftsman Style.
