= East Tampa =

- Neighborhood
- Location within the state of Florida
- Coordinates: 27°58′25″N 82°26′8″W
- Country: United States
- State: Florida
- County: Hillsborough
- City: Tampa

Population (2010)
  - Total: 16,355
- Time zone: UTC-5 (Eastern (EST))
  - Summer (DST): UTC-4 (EDT)
- ZIP codes: 33605 and 33610
- Area code: 813

East Tampa is a district within the city limits of Tampa, Florida. As of the 2010 census the neighborhood had a population of 16,355. The ZIP Codes serving the neighborhood are 33605 and 33610. The district is about four miles northeast of Downtown Tampa.

== Geography ==
East Tampa boundaries are roughly Hillsborough Avenue to the north, 15th Street to the west, Interstate 4 to the south, and 40th Street to the east.

== History ==
The area has been the location of several riots.

== Demographics ==
Source: Hillsborough County Atlas

As of the census of 2010, there were 16,355 people and 5,565 households residing in the neighborhood. The population density was 4,447/mi^{2}. The racial makeup of the neighborhood was 10% White, 84% Black or African American, less than 1% Native American, less than 1% Asian, less than 2% from other races, and 2% from two or more races. Hispanic or Latino of any race were 11% of the population.

There were 5,565 households, out of which 31% had children under the age of 18 living with them, 22% were married couples living together, 18% had a female householder with no husband present, and 17% were non-families. 27% of all households were made up of individuals.

In the neighborhood the population was spread out, with 31% under the age of 18, 22% from 18 to 34, 18% from 35 to 49, 17% from 50 to 64, and 13% who were 65 years of age or older. For every 100 females, there were 87.4 males.

The per capita income for the neighborhood was $11,133. About 33% of the population were below the poverty line, including 47.0% of those under age 18 and 9.0% of those age 65 or over.

== Areas within East Tampa ==
East Tampa consists of three distinct areas:

- Belmont Heights
- College Hill
- Jackson Heights

== Education ==
East Tampa is served by Hillsborough County Public Schools, which serves Hillsborough County. Schools which are located within the neighborhood are as follows:

=== Elementary ===
- Edison
- Lockhart
- Lomax
- Potter

=== Middle ===
- Andrew J. Ferrell Middle Magnet School
- Benjamin Franklin Middle Magnet School
- Orange Grove Middle Magnet School
- Nathan B. Young Middle Magnet School

=== High ===
- Middleton High School

== See also ==
- Neighborhoods in Tampa, Florida
