= Northeast Community =

- Neighborhood
- Location within the state of Florida
- Coordinates: 28°0′10″N 82°24′43″W
- Country: United States
- State: Florida
- County: Hillsborough
- City: Tampa

Population (2010)
  - Total: 1,663
- Time zone: UTC-5 (Eastern (EST))
  - Summer (DST): UTC-4 (EDT)
- ZIP codes: 33604, 33610, and 33617
- Area code: 813

Northeast Community is a neighborhood within the city limits of Tampa, Florida. As of the 2010 census the neighborhood had a population of 1,663. The ZIP Codes serving the neighborhood are 33604, 33610, and 33617.

== Geography ==
Northeast Community boundaries are roughly the Hillsborough River to the north, 40th Street to the west, Hillsborough Avenue to the south and Del Rio to the east.

== Demographics ==
Source: Hillsborough County Atlas

At the 2010 census there were 1,663 people and 613 households residing in the neighborhood. The population density was 5,195/mi^{2}. The racial makeup of the neighborhood was 15% White, 78% African American, 0% Native American, 2% Asian, 4% from other races, and 5% from two or more races. Hispanic or Latino of any race were 12%.

Of the 613 households 33% had children under the age of 18 living with them, 26% were married couples living together, 35% had a female householder with no husband present, and 7% were non-families. 25% of households were made up of individuals.

The age distribution was 30% under the age of 18, 24% from 18 to 34, 19% from 35 to 49, 18% from 50 to 64, and 11% 65 or older. For every 100 females, there were 82.1 males.

The per capita income for the neighborhood was $12,716. About 31% of the population were below the poverty line, including 20.0% of those under age 18 and 9.0% of those age 65 or over.

== Transportation ==
The community is served primarily by two HARTline bus lines:

- Line 5 - Downtown Tampa to U.A.T.C. (via 40th Street)
- Line 34 - Netpark to Hanley/Waters Plaza (via Hillsborough Avenue)

== See also ==
- Neighborhoods in Tampa, Florida
