= McKay Bay Nature Park =

Park in Tampa, Florida, U.S.

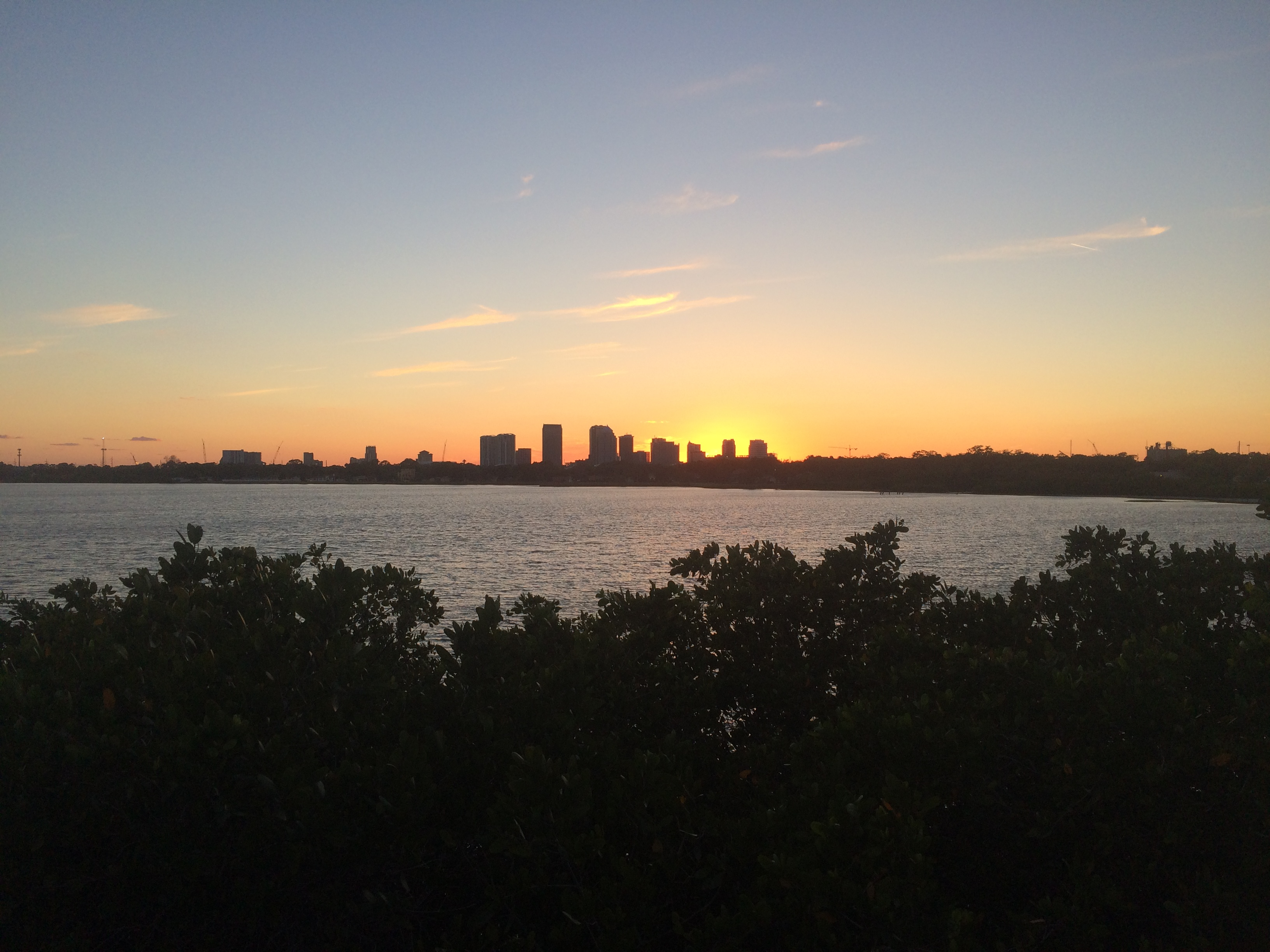
- Location: 134 North 34th Street
- Nearest city: Tampa, Florida
- Coordinates: 27.9521°N 82.4215°W
- Area: 38 acres (0.15 km^{2})
- Established: 1982

McKay Bay Nature Park is a 38-acre (15 ha) park in Tampa.

There is a 900-foot (270 m) boardwalk trail through mangroves and mudflats, an observation tower that doubles as an education pavilion, a paved 1.25-mile (2.01 km) multi-use trail and .5-mile (0.80 km) nature trail. Picnic tables and interpretive signage are offered. The boardwalks remain closed since 2015.

The park is part of the larger 62-acre (25 ha) McKay Bay Preserve. Many species of wading birds forage, particularly in winter months. Birds may also be viewed with spotting scopes from either the park's observation tower/education pavilion, located on the east side, or the bird-viewing station on the west side.

== McKay Bay Greenway ==
The complete McKay Bay Park and Greenway encompass about 200 acres (81 ha). The preserved area is operated in a partnership between the City of Tampa, Hillsborough County and the Southwest Florida Water Management District. The land was purchased using the Hillsborough County ELAP Program in 1990 and a smaller parcel on the Palm River was purchased in 2000 by ELAPP and the State of Florida Greenways and Trails Program. A large tract of land along the southeast shoreline is owned by the Southwest Florida Water Management District, and used as a spoil disposal area for the Tampa Bypass Canal.
