= Southeast Seminole Heights =

- Neighborhood
- Location within the state of Florida
- Coordinates: 27°59′25″N 82°26′45″W
- Country: United States
- State: Florida
- County: Hillsborough
- City: Tampa

Population (2000)
  - Total: 3,384
- Time zone: UTC-5 (Eastern (EST))
  - Summer (DST): UTC-4 (EDT)
- ZIP codes: 33603
- Area code: 813

Southeast Seminole Heights is a neighborhood within the Seminole Heights district of Tampa, Florida. As of the 2000 census the neighborhood had a population of 3,384. The ZIP Code of the neighborhood is 33603.

== Geography ==
Southeast Seminole Heights boundaries are Hillsborough Avenue to the north, Interstate 275 to the west, Dr. Martin Luther King Jr. Blvd. to the south and 15th Street to the east.

== Demographics ==
Source: Hillsborough County Atlas

At the 2000 census there were 3,384 people and 1,253 households residing in the neighborhood. The population density was 5,076/mi^{2}. The racial makeup of the neighborhood was 48% White, 42% African American, 1% Native American, 0.0% Asian, less than 7% from other races, and 3% from two or more races. Hispanic or Latino of any race were 23.0%.

Of the 1,253 households 39% had children under the age of 18 living with them, 31% were married couples living together, 18% had a female householder with no husband present, and 9% were non-families. 28% of households were made up of individuals. .

The age distribution was 28% under the age of 18, 23% from 18 to 34, 25% from 35 to 49, 13% from 50 to 64, and 10% 65 or older. The median age was 40 years. For every 100 females, there were 92.3 males.

The per capita income for the neighborhood was $12,906. About 44% of the population were below the poverty line, including 0.0% of those under age 18 and 7.0% of those age 65 or over.

== See also ==
- Neighborhoods in Tampa, Florida
