= College Hill (Tampa) =

- Neighborhood
- Location within the state of Florida
- Coordinates: 27°58′34″N 82°25′53″W
- Country: United States
- State: Florida
- County: Hillsborough
- City: Tampa

Population (2010)
  - Total: 703
- Time zone: UTC-5 (Eastern (EST))
  - Summer (DST): UTC-4 (EDT)
- ZIP codes: 33605 and 33610

College Hill is a neighborhood within the city limits of Tampa, Florida, in the United States. As of the 2010 census the neighborhood had a population of 703. However this includes only the subdivision of Belmont Heights Estates. Neighboring Ponce de Leon Estates is also part of this neighborhood the ZIP Codes serving the neighborhood are 33605 and 33610. The neighborhood is part of the East Tampa District. The neighborhood includes a new community of Belmont Heights Estates, which was built out in 2002 to replace substandard housing in the area.

== History ==
The first records show the area listed as A.F. Randall's College Hill Subdivision in 1887. The area was outside of the city limits of Tampa until 1927, and lacked water and sewer connections and most other basic services. The area was mostly rented to blacks, and became the largest black neighborhood in Tampa. College Hill was "practically the only place in Tampa where Negroes can buy building lots at present", wrote Benjamin Mays, director of the Tampa Urban League, in 1927.

The public housing projects College Hill Homes and Ponce de Leon Court played a major role in the area, beginning in the 1940s. They were torn down at the beginning of the twenty-first century The area has been the location of several riots. The area was heavily affected by the cocaine epidemic of the 1980s, causing heavy crime in the area.

== Geography ==
College Hill boundaries are 26th Avenue to the south, Dr. Martin Luther King Jr. Boulevard to the north, 29th Street to the east and 15th Street to the west. This area is the southern part of the Belmont Heights Neighborhood and is often considered to be part of it

== Demographics ==
Source: Hillsborough County Atlas

As of the 2010 census, there were 703 people and 217 households residing in the neighborhood. The population density was 4,991/mi^{2}. The racial makeup of the neighborhood was 4% White, 91% African American, 0% Native American, 0% Asian or Pacific Islander, 2% from other races and 3% from two or more races. Hispanic or Latino of any race were 8% of the population.

Of the 217 households 39% had children under the age of 18 living with them, 21% were married couples living together, 47% had a female householder with no husband present, and 3% were non-families. 22% of households were made up of individuals.

The age distribution was 35% under the age of 18, 23% from 18 to 34, 17% from 35 to 49, 16% from 50 to 64, and 12% 65 or older. For every 100 females, there were 89.8 males.

The per capita income for the neighborhood was $12,159. About 42% of the population were below the poverty line, 44% of those are under the age of 18.

== See also ==
- Neighborhoods in Tampa, Florida
