= Live Oaks Square =

- Neighborhood
- Location within the state of Florida
- Coordinates: 28°0′2″N 82°25′9″W
- Country: United States
- State: Florida
- County: Hillsborough
- City: Tampa

Population (2010)
  - Total: 2,005
- Time zone: UTC-5 (Eastern (EST))
  - Summer (DST): UTC-4 (EDT)
- ZIP codes: 33610
- Area code: 813

Live Oaks Square is a neighborhood within the city limits of Tampa, Florida. As of the 2010 census the neighborhood had a population of 2,005. The ZIP Code serving the neighborhood is 33610.

== Geography ==
Live Oaks Square boundaries are roughly Hanna Avenue to the north, 40th Street to the east, Hillsborough Avenue to the south and 30th Street to the west.

== Demographics ==
Source: Hillsborough County Atlas

At the 2010 census there were 2,005 people and 682 households residing in the neighborhood. The population density was 5,271/mi^{2}. The racial makeup of the neighborhood was 8% White, 86% African American, 1% Native American, 1% Asian, 2% from other races, and 3.0% from two or more races. Hispanic or Latino of any race were 9%.

Of the 682 households 30% had children under the age of 18 living with them, 28% were married couples living together, 37% had a female householder with no husband present, and 5% were non-families. 24% of households were made up of individuals.

The age distribution was 28% under the age of 18, 23% from 18 to 34, 18% from 35 to 49, 17% from 50 to 64, and 15% 65 or older. For every 100 females, there were 84.5 males.

The per capita income for the neighborhood was $14,475. About 21% of the population were below the poverty line, including 17.0% of those under age 18 and 13.0% of those age 65 or over.

== Transportation ==
The community is served primarily by three HARTline bus lines:

The following HARTline lines which serves the neighborhood:

- Line 5 - Downtown Tampa to U.A.T.C. (via 40th Street)
- Line 9 - Downtown Tampa to U.A.T.C. (via 30th Street)
- Line 34 - Netpark to Town 'n' Country (via Hillsborough Avenue)

== See also ==
- Neighborhoods in Tampa, Florida
