= Hillsborough Avenue =

Major east-west State Road and US Highway in Hillsborough County, Florida

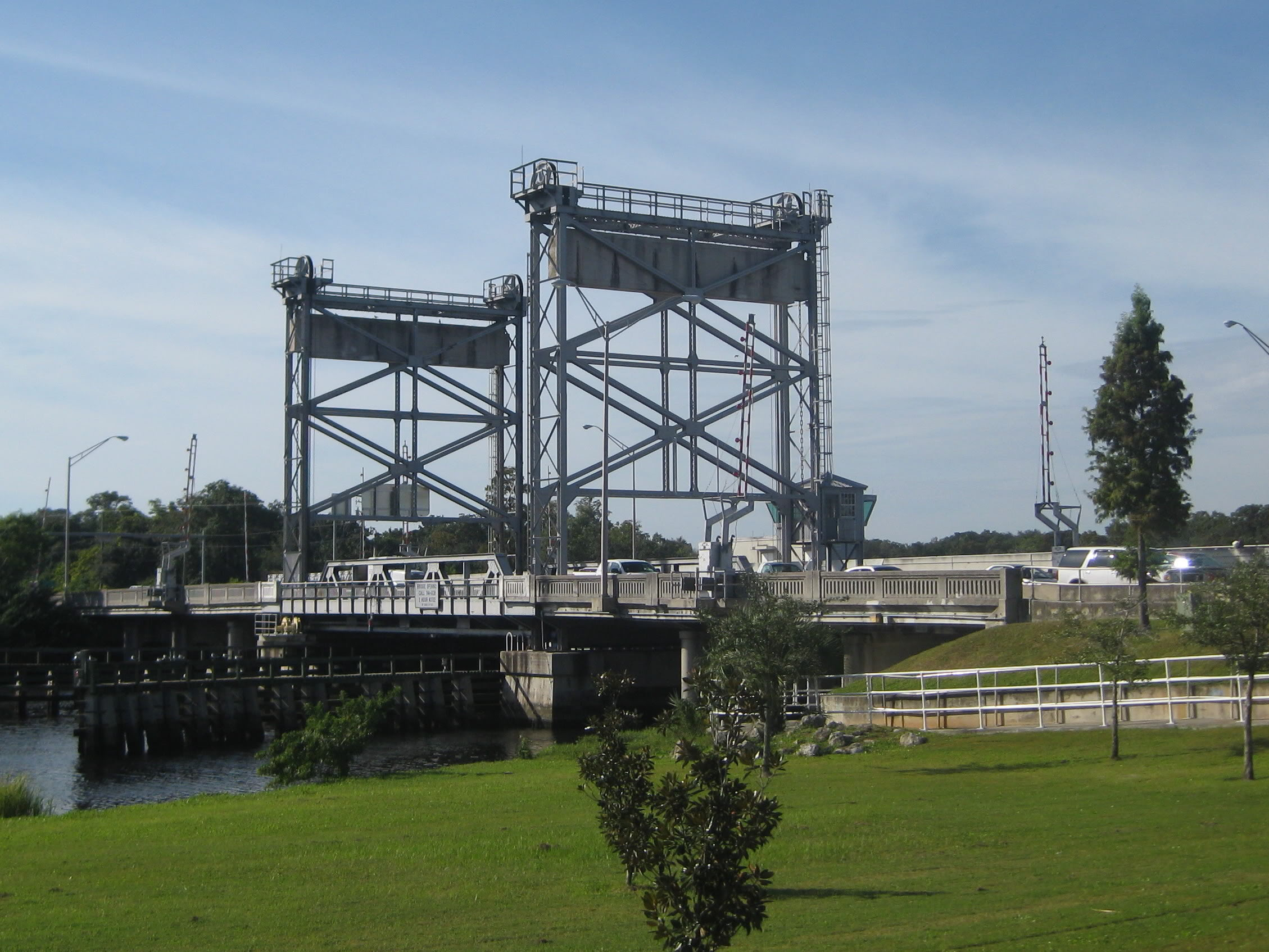
- Hillsborough Avenue Bridge
- West end: Hillsborough–Pinellas county line near Oldsmar
- Major junctions: SR 589 near Town 'n' Country US 92 / SR 580 (Dale Mabry Highway); I-275 US 41 (concurrency) in Tampa
- East end: I-4 in East Lake-Orient Park

Hillsborough Avenue is a major east–west arterial road in Hillsborough County, Florida, also designated as State Road 580, U.S. Highway 41 or U.S. Highway 92 in various places.

== Route description ==
Hillsborough Avenue runs from the Hillsborough/Pinellas county line, near Oldsmar to Interstate 4 in unincorporated Hillsborough County. This route takes it through the city of Tampa, where it crosses the Hillsborough River. The crossings of the Hillsborough River include and eastbound vertical lift bridge, and a westbound bascule bridge.

At Florida Avenue, US 92/Hillsborough Avenue crosses U.S. Business Route 41. Two blocks east of the interchange with Interstate 275, the road encounters the intersection with Nebraska Avenue, where an overlap with US 41 begins. South of US 92, Nebraska Avenue is Florida State Road 45. Along the way, the overlap between US 41 and 92 encounters a railroad crossing with the CSX Clearwater Subdivision. The US 41-92 overlap ends at North 40th Street where southbound US 41 turns right, and eastbound US 92 continues along Hillsborough Avenue The street runs along a bridge over the CSX Neve Spur then has an intersection with Florida State Road 583.

According to the Florida Department of Transportation, Hillsborough Avenue from Nebraska Avenue to 50th Street has increased in the number of accidents reported, up from 269 in 1999 to 351 in 2005.

== Landmarks ==
- Tampa International Airport
- Hillsborough River
- Seminole Hard Rock Hotel and Casino Tampa
