= Pedestrian crossings in Portland, Oregon =

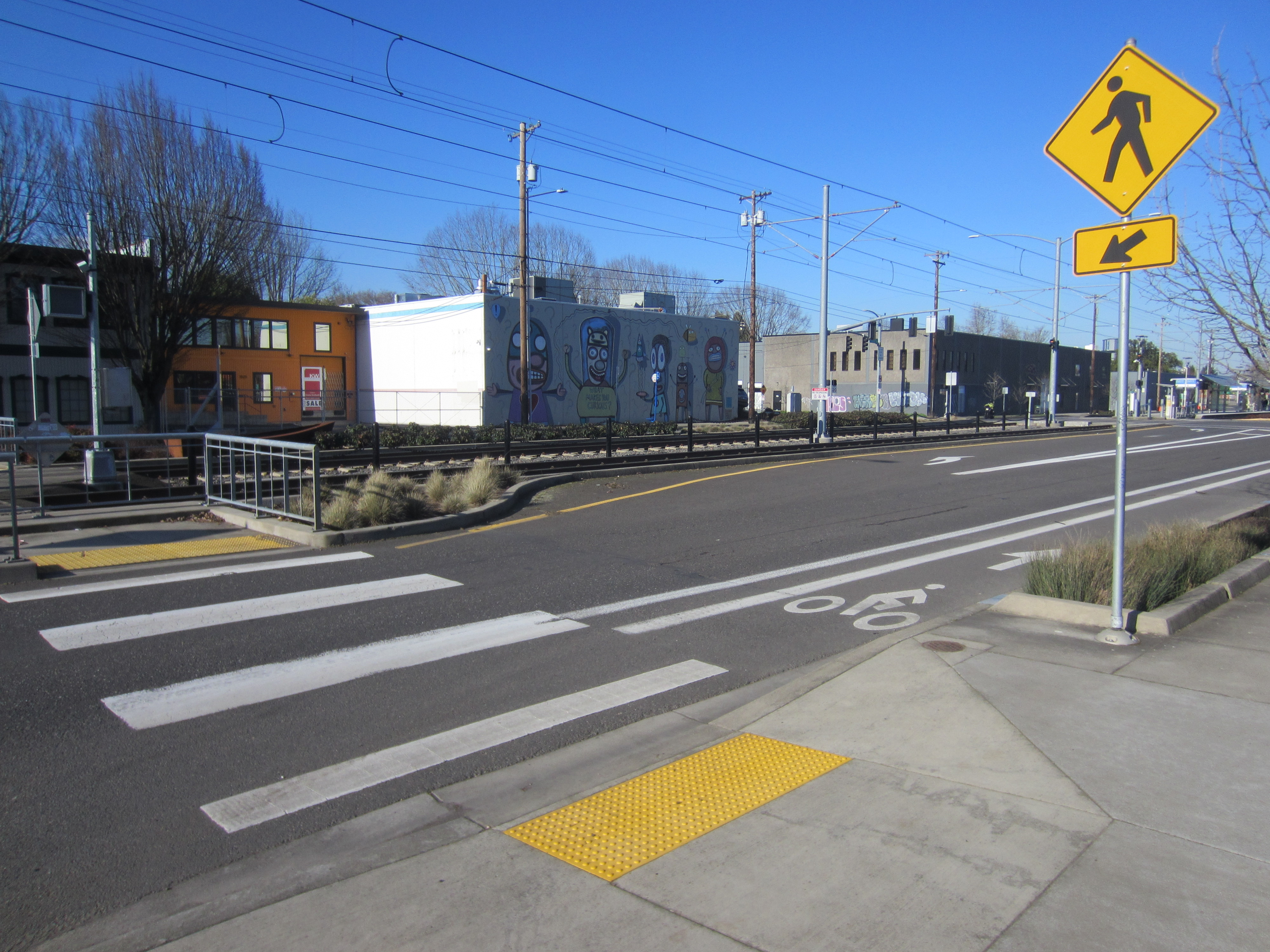
Pedestrian crossing in southeast Portland's Brooklyn neighborhood, 2021

In the American city of Portland, Oregon, pedestrian crossings are managed by the Oregon Department of Transportation (ODOT) and the Portland Bureau of Transportation (PBOT). There are fewer crosswalks on the city's east side, compared to downtown Portland and centrally located neighborhoods.

Lawsuits have been filed against the city because of deaths at pedestrian crossings, and Portland has seen the installation of artistic crossings as well as guerrilla crosswalks.

== History ==
In 2003, the Portland Bureau of Transportation (PBOT) tested "talking crosswalks". PBOT installed the city's first pedestrian scramble in northwest Portland's Pearl District in 2015. When the scramble opened, square dancers demonstrated how the crosswalks should be used.

Lawsuits have been filed against the city because of deaths at pedestrian crossings.

=== Safety enforcement ===
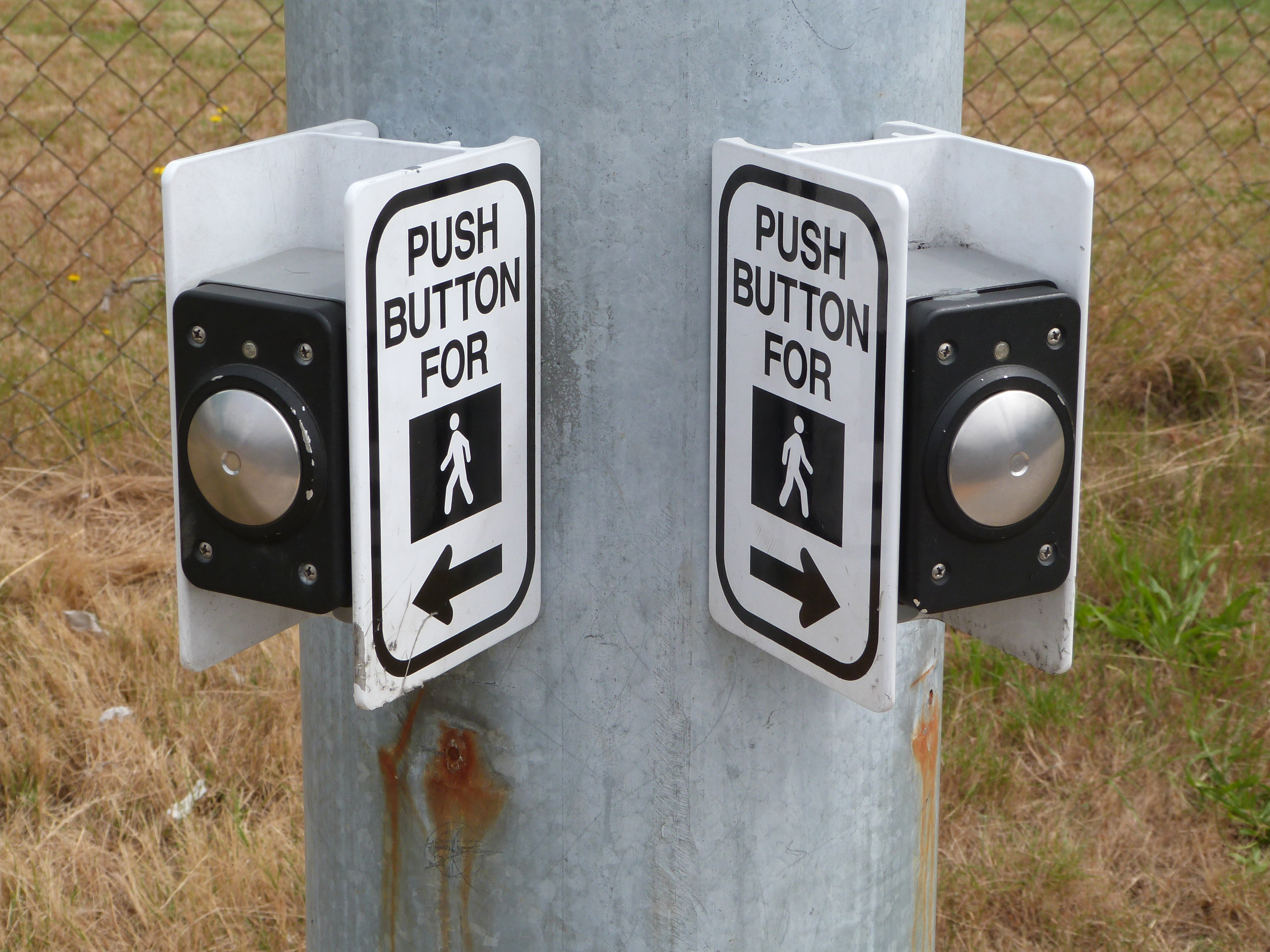
Pedestrian light call buttons on Hayden Island in north Portland, 2012

In 2023, the Oregon Department of Transportation (ODOT) announced plans to close 181 pedestrian crossings, including 53 in the Portland metropolitan area, citing safety concerns. ODOT has worked to install pedestrian-activated beacons throughout the metropolitan area, including along Southeast Powell Boulevard, Southwest Barbur, and the Tualatin Valley Highway.

In 2014, two Oregon state representatives secured funding for flashing beacons to enhance safety for pedestrians at 18 of east Portland's most dangerous intersections. PBOT has conducted crosswalk stings along 82nd Avenue to improve pedestrian safety. Improved crosswalks are being installed along the corridor, as of 2024.

== Artistic crossings ==
In 2015, the city installed two artistic crossings (or "creative crosswalks") with rain drops and umbrellas in Old Town Chinatown. Jake Kaempf of Ampersand Content helped with the weather-themed design. Requested by the Old Town Chinatown Community Association, the crosswalks were Portland's first artistic zebra crossings.

== Community activism ==
As of 2012, there was a Tumblr page dedicated to Portland's fading pedestrian crossings.

The pedestrian advocacy group Oregon Walks has asked Portland City Council to require PBOT to comply with Oregon's law forbidding vehicles from parking within 20 feet of a pedestrian crossing. Separately, a transportation activist filed a lawsuit against the city in 2020.

=== Guerilla crosswalks ===
The city has seen the installation of guerrilla crosswalks. In some cases, residents added markings following the death of a pedestrian. A guerrilla crosswalk was painted on East Burnside Street in 2008. In 2018, someone placed pedestrian crossing flags at an intersection in northeast Portland's Concordia neighborhood.

PDX Transformation, described as "a contingent of anonymous street safety advocates", has installed guerrilla crosswalks. The city has had to remove certain "do it yourself" ("DIY") markings for safety purposes.

== See also ==
- Crosswalks in North America
- Pedestrian crossings in Seattle
- Transportation in Portland, Oregon
