= New Suburb Beautiful =

- Neighborhood
- Location within the state of Florida
- Coordinates: 27°56′8″N 82°29′48″W
- Country: United States
- State: Florida
- County: Hillsborough
- City: Tampa

Population (2010)
  - Total: 921
- Time zone: UTC-5 (Eastern (EST))
  - Summer (DST): UTC-4 (EDT)
- ZIP codes: 33629

New Suburb Beautiful is a small neighborhood within the Hyde Park district of Tampa, Florida. As of the 2010 census the neighborhood had a population of 921. The ZIP Code neighborhood is 33629.

== Geography ==
New Suburb Beautiful's boundaries are roughly Morrison Avenue to the north, MacDill Avenue to the west, Prospect Road to the south, Howard Avenue to the east, and the Lee Roy Selmon Expressway diagonally to the Southeast. The roads start with Morrison Avenue in the North, then Jetton Avenue, Watrous Avenue, Sunset Drive, and Prospect Road. From east to west there is Howard Avenue, Moody Avenue, Georgia Avenue, Marti Street, and MacDill Avenue. The westerly portion is sometimes referred to as West New Suburb Beautiful.

== Demographics ==
Source: Hillsborough County Atlas

At the 2010 census there were 921 people and 340 households residing in the neighborhood. The population density was 7,609/mi^{2}. The racial makeup of the neighborhood was 97% White, 0% African American, 0.0% Native American, 1% Asian, 0% from other races, and 5% from two or more races. Hispanic or Latino of any race were 5%.

Of the 340 households 42% had children under the age of 18 living with them, 64% were married couples living together, 7% had a female householder with no husband present, and 7% were non-families. 20% of households were one person and 14.9% were one person aged 65 or older.

The age distribution was 30% under the age of 18, 13% from 18 to 34, 27% from 35 to 49, 21% from 50 to 64, and 11% 65 or older. The median age was 40 years. For every 100 females, there were 99.6 males.

The per capita income for the neighborhood was $38,548. About 3% of the population were below the poverty line, including 0.0% of those under age 18 and 1.0% of those age 65 or over.

== Neighborhood ==
Situated in the South Tampa region between Downtown Tampa and MacDill Air Force Base, the neighborhood is one of the smallest within the city limits of Tampa with 77 acres (310,000 m^{2}). It is also located between Bayshore Boulevard and Dale Mabry Highway. Plant High School serves its population.

== See also ==
- Neighborhoods in Tampa, Florida
- Alfred Swann, developer involved with the original Suburb Beautiful
- Eugene Hottsinger, developer involved with the original Suburb Beautiful subdivision.
