= Pedestrian crossings in Seattle =

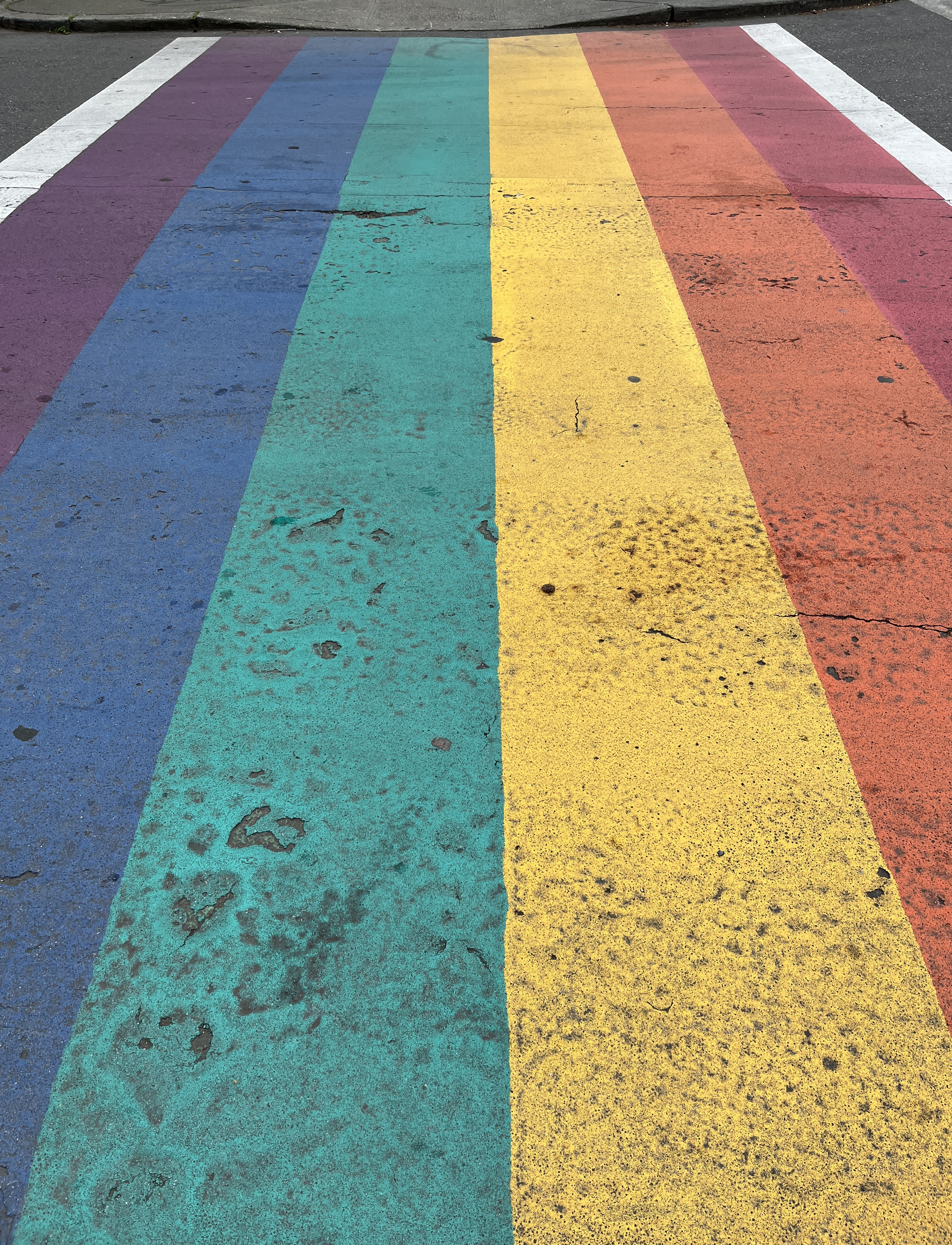
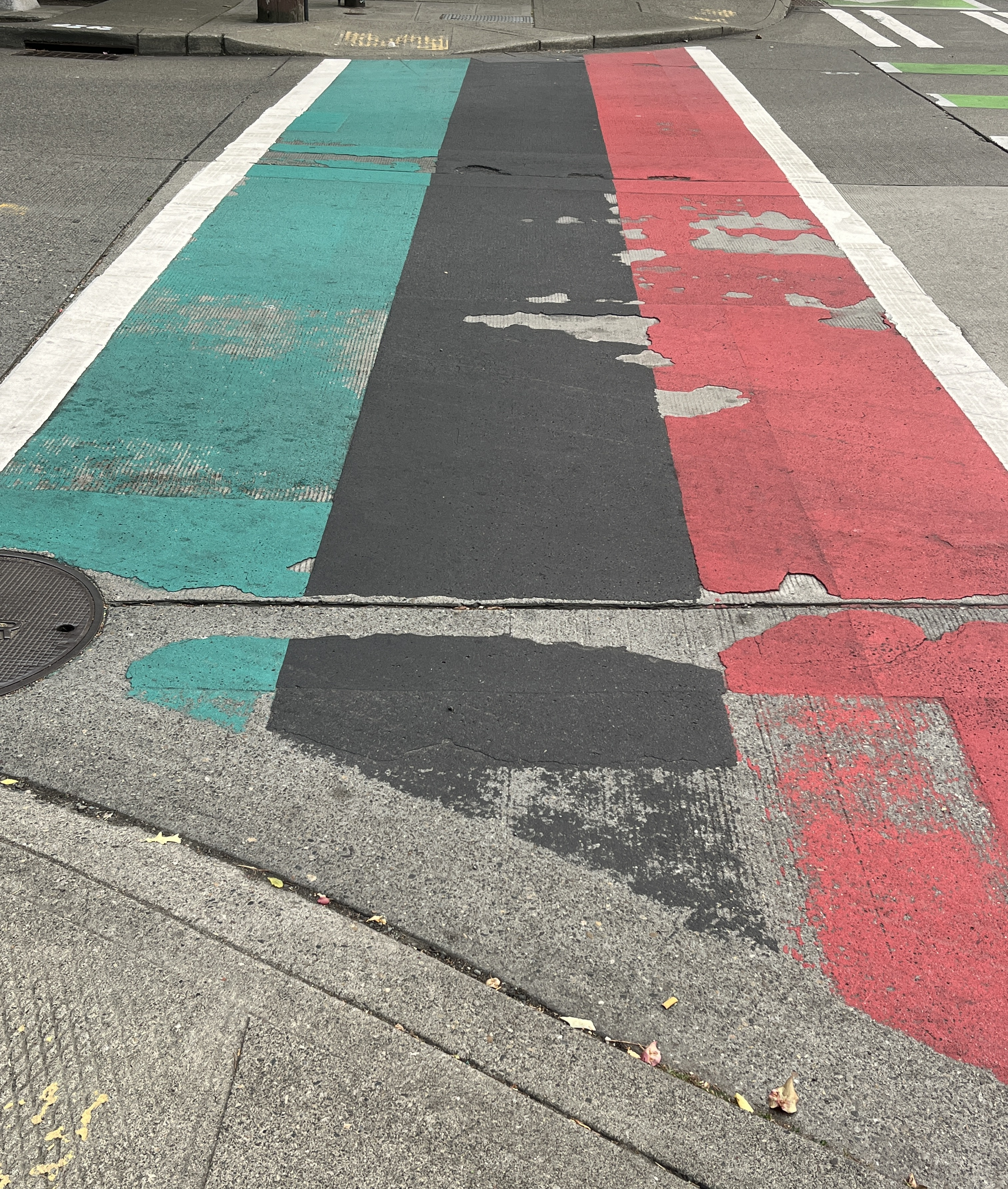
One of Seattle's rainbow crossings on Capitol Hill (left) and another pedestrian crossing painted with the colors of the pan-African flag in the Central District (right)

In Seattle, in the U.S. state of Washington, pedestrian crossings are managed by several government agencies, including the Seattle Department of Transportation (SDOT). Since privately funded rainbow crossings were installed on Capitol Hill in 2015, SDOT has sanctioned the installation of more than 40 artistic crosswalks. Works include "rainbow stripes and geometric designs created by local artists", according to The New York Times. SDOT's Community Crosswalks program considers community proposals. Seattle has also seen residents create guerilla crosswalks.

== Background ==
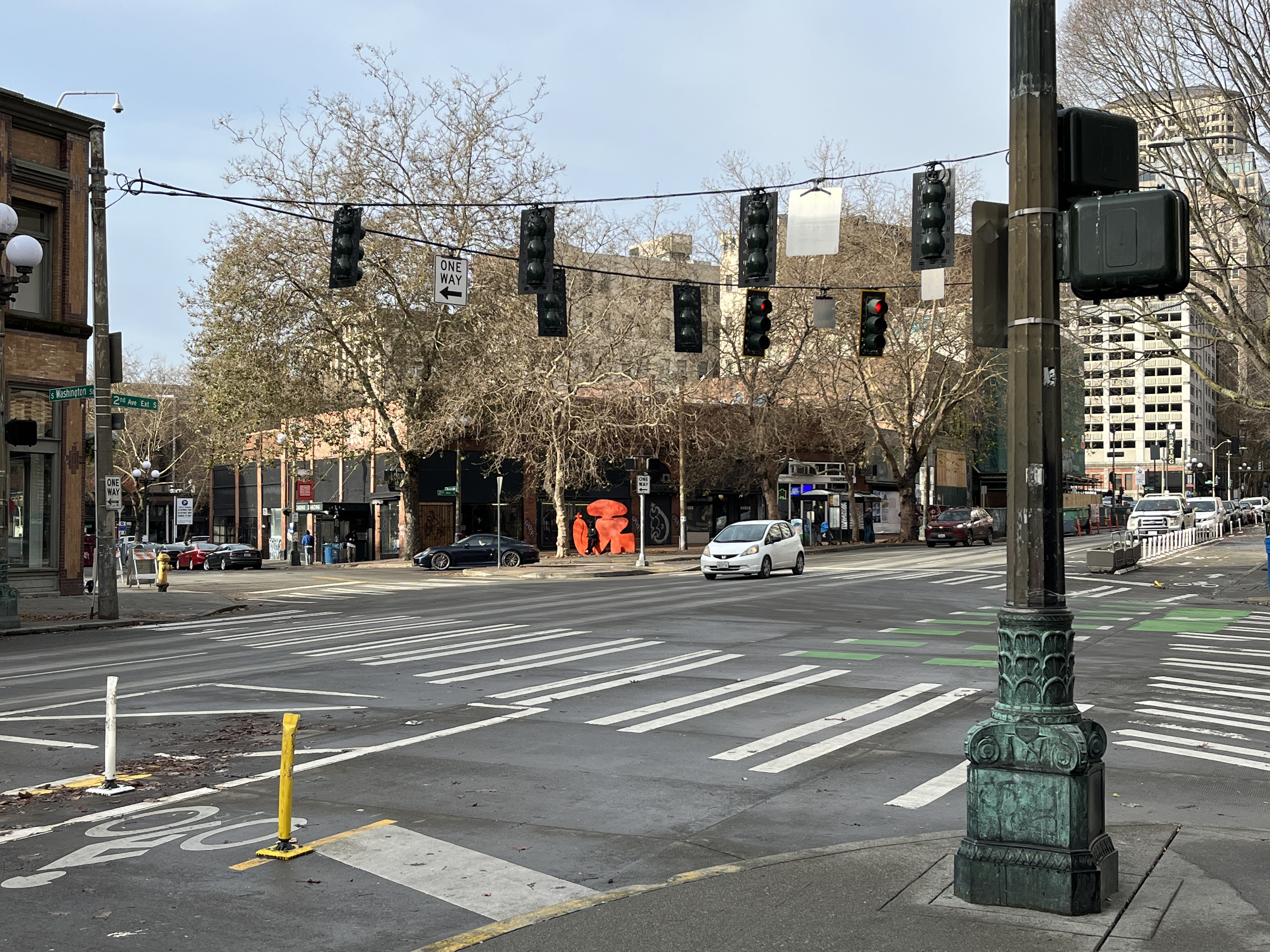
A typical pedestrian crossing with white stripes in Seattle in 2022

The Seattle Department of Transportation (SDOT) typically paints white stripes and uses thermoplastic for crosswalks. In 2014, the agency began testing methyl methacrylate (MMA) on crosswalks. The city's crosswalks are typically painted in a "piano key" pattern with two blocks of white spaced closely together. Crosswalks on state highways maintained by the Washington State Department of Transportation (WSDOT) use other patterns, including "ladder bars" with even spacing.

Following the installation of Seattle's rainbow crossings in 2015, SDOT and the Seattle Department of Neighborhoods (SDON) launched the Community Crosswalks program. According to KOMO-TV, "People can submit their own designs, but the design must include two white horizontal stripes. It also cannot include text or symbols. Designs will only be considered for locations that already have a marked crosswalk in place."

Washington state law requires drivers to stop for pedestrians at most intersections, painted or otherwise, unless posted signage specifically prohibits pedestrians from crossing. In 2022, an informal survey of 1,000 Seattleites completed by SDOT showed 70 percent of drivers said they stop for pedestrians at painted crosswalks. SDOT said less than 20 percent of drivers stopped for pedestrians during observations.

== Artistic crossings ==
=== Capitol Hill's rainbow crossings ===
In 2015, eleven rainbow crossings were installed at six intersections on Capitol Hill to commemorate and improve safety for members of the LGBT community. The privately funded crosswalks inspired the creation of other colorful pedestrian crossings throughout the city. The Federal Highway Administration and the U.S. Department of Transportation said the crosswalks were potentially unsafe. SDOT disagreed and has since sanctioned the installation of other artistic crossings.

=== Central District ===
Following Capitol Hill's rainbow crossings, multiple crosswalk painted red, black, and green appeared on Martin Luther King Jr. Way in the Central District. It was later revealed that community activists with the United Hood Movement had painted four crossings. According to Ellis Simani of the South Seattle Emerald, the crosswalks "[paid] homage to the Pan-African Flag, which serves as a symbol of pride, empowerment, and black liberation for many within the African American community". SDOT initially said in a statement, "While we are supportive of community building activities, we must ensure that the city's crosswalks remain recognizable and safe. We are reviewing what action should be taken." SDOT later worked with community members to paint multiple crossings with the colors of the pan-African flag in the Central District. The first crossing was painted at 23rd Avenue and Martin Luther King Jr. Way in March 2016. The crosswalk was remodeled when 10 more crossings were painted a few months later.

=== Phinney Ridge and Rainier Beach ===
By September 2015, painted crossings had appeared at Phinney Ridge and Rainier Beach. Piano keys were painted outside A-1 Piano on Phinney Ridge. In Rainier Beach, a crossing was painted using green, red, and yellow, which are the colors of the flag of Ethiopia. A Seattle Globist contributor wrote, "This effort seems to be a continuation of the pan-African flag-themed paint jobs that happened in the Central District a few weeks ago... According to a notes posted nearby, the aim was to raise concerns about gun violence, gentrification and incarceration."

=== Downtown ===
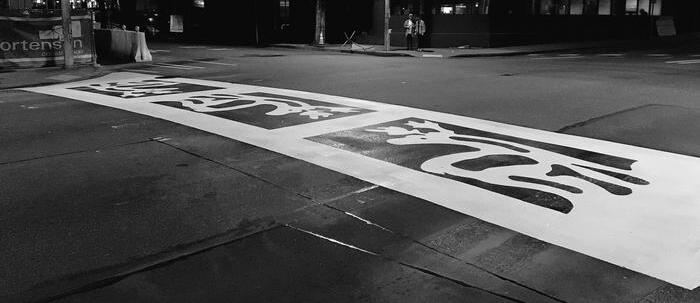
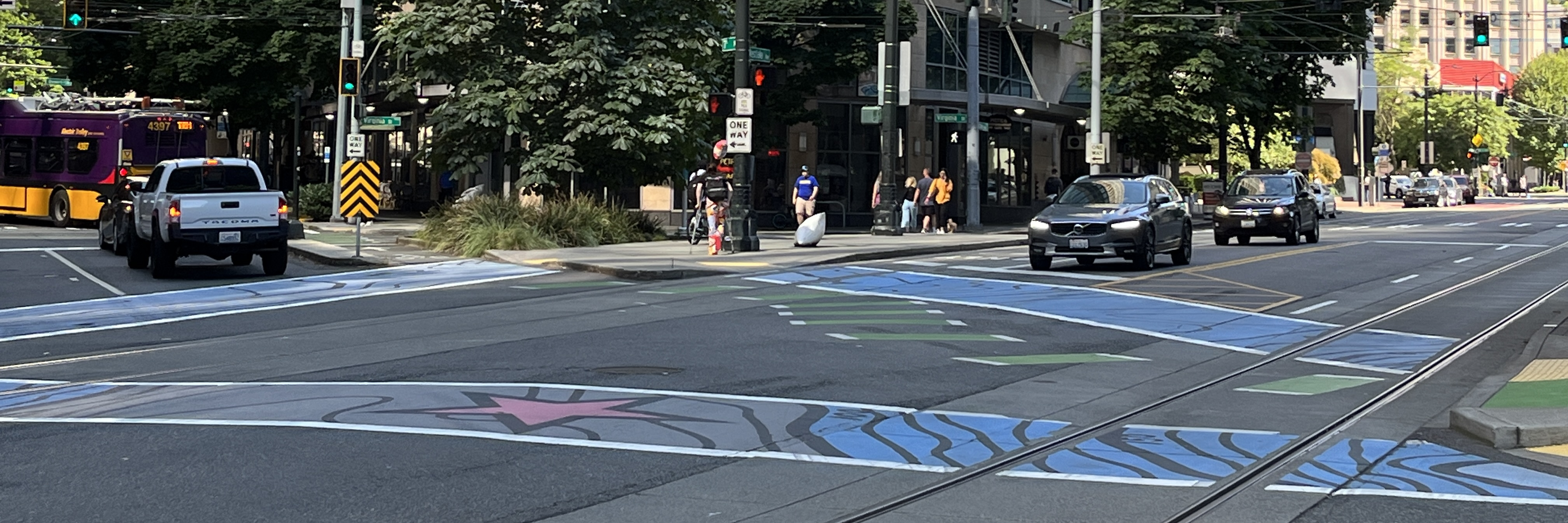
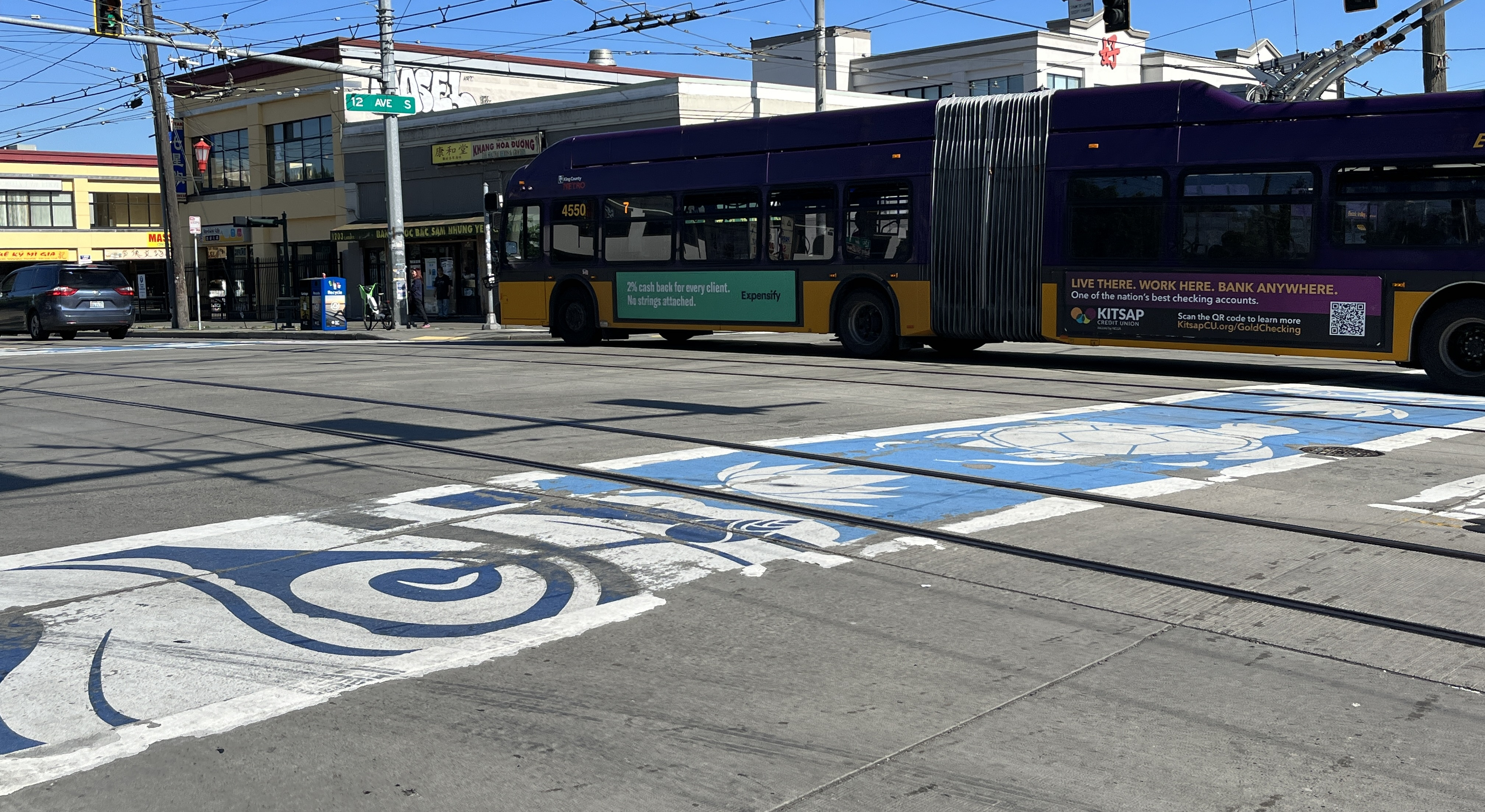
Among artistic pedestrian crossings in downtown Seattle are the memorial for John T. Williams (top), another the intersection of 7th and Westlake (middle), and one by Duy Vo in the Little Saigon part of the Chinatown–International District (bottom)

==== John T. Williams memorial ====
In 2016, a memorial crosswalk was painted at Boren Avenue and Howell Street in downtown Seattle to commemorate Native American woodcarver John T. Williams, who was killed by a police officer in 2010. The crossing was a collaboration between SDOT, SDON, and the Seattle Indian Health Board. A dedication ceremony for the artistic crosswalk, which features a repeated design of a "White Deer Person" and is intended to promote peace, was held in September.

==== 7th and Westlake ====
In 2017, artist Will Schlough designed four concepts for crosswalks at the intersection of 7th Avenue and Westlake Avenue. The project was spearheaded by the Downtown Seattle Association.

==== Chinatown–International District ====
In 2017, crosswalks designed by Vietnamese American artist Duy Vo were painted at the intersection of 12th Avenue South and South Jackson Street in the Little Saigon part of the Chinatown–International District. Known as the Little Saigon Community Crosswalks, the blue and white crossings depict a swimming turtle and lotus plants. According to the International Examiner:

Vo created a design meant to represent the Vietnamese American experience. The turtle has been present for centuries in Vietnamese mythology and is strongly associated with luck, longevity, and perseverance. The lotus symbolizes beauty and strength in the face of adversity. The blue water gradient is a nod to the ocean that borders Vietnam and depicts a sense of adaptability, a quality that Vietnamese immigrants and refugees had to embrace in order to rebuild their lives in new countries and cultures.

==== Alone Together ====
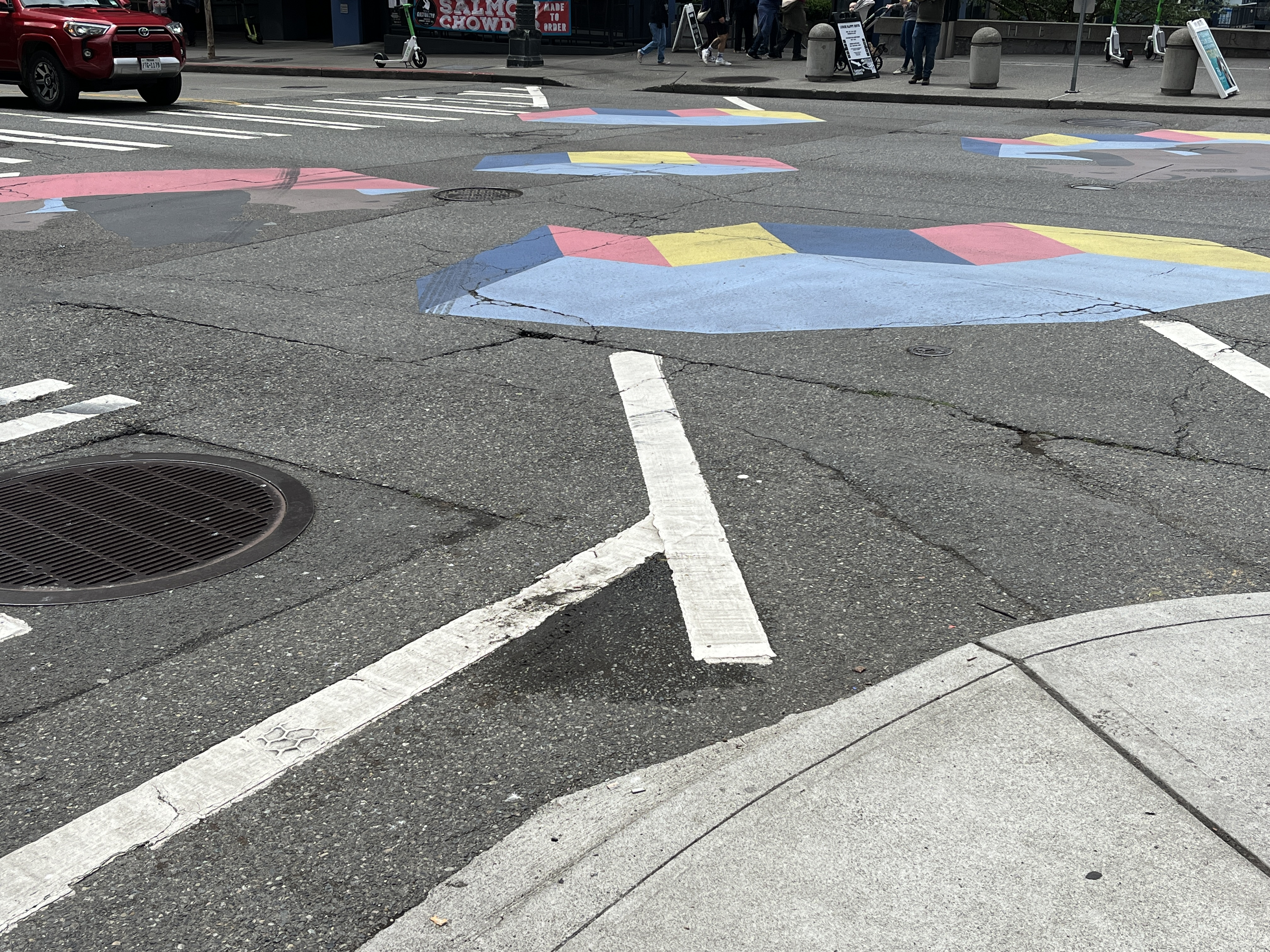
Alone Together in 2023

Juliana Kang Robinson's temporary public artwork Alone Together was installed at an all-walk intersection at University and 1st Avenue, near the Seattle Art Museum, in 2019. The work has six "separate but thematically connected" images. According to Madison Miller of the Mercer Island Reporter"

In Robinson's design, bears are the main character in the illustrated series of images. The images reference a Korean creation myth and serve as a reminder that people — like animals — share the same needs and strengths. Robinson's intent is to showcase that all people can find refuge and strength in togetherness and that all families belong together.

==== Pioneer Square ====
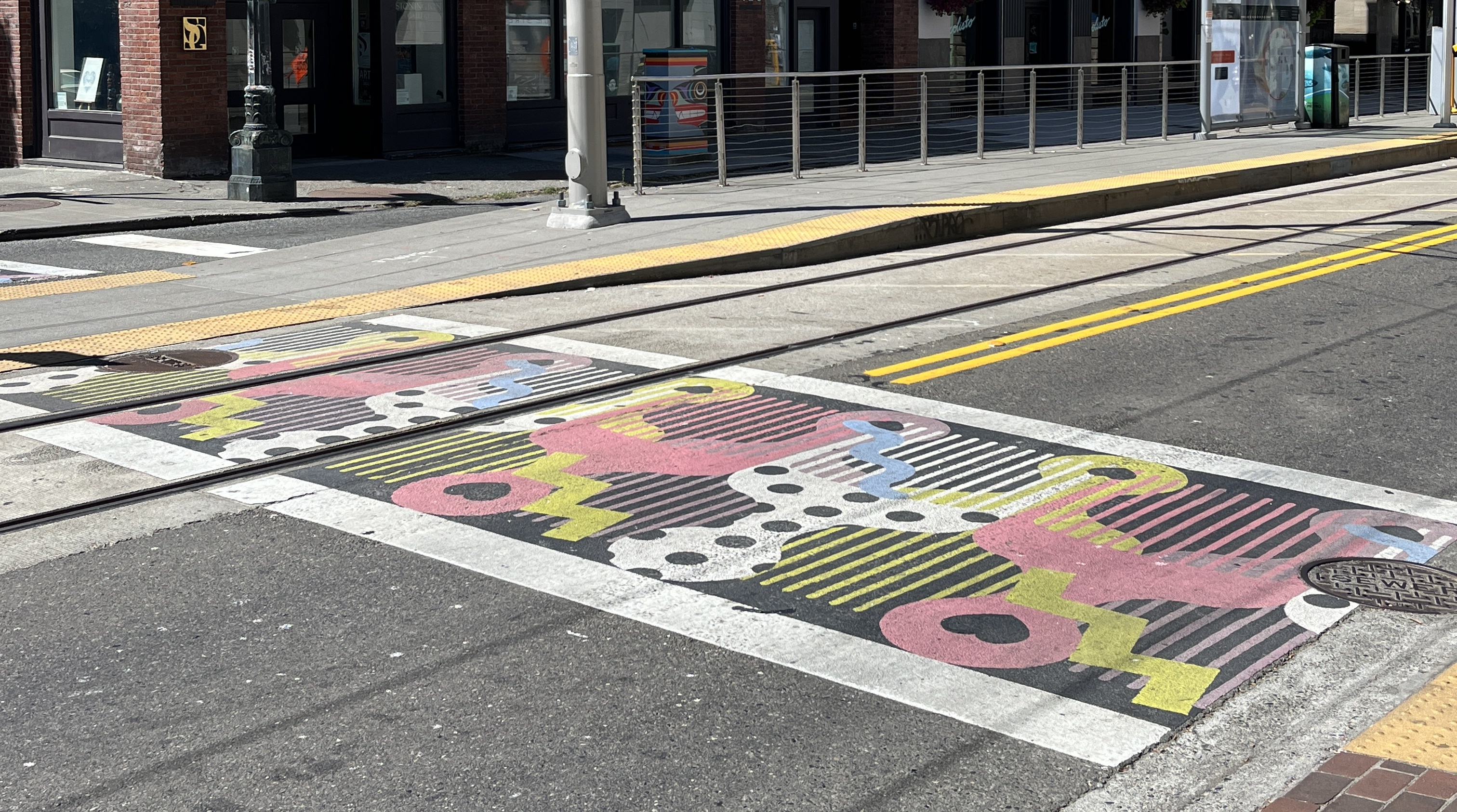
The artistic crossing at Occidental Avenue South and South Jackson Street in Pioneer Square, 2023

In 2022, artist Tariqa Waters completed work on a crosswalk at the intersection of Occidental Avenue South and South Jackson Street in Pioneer Square.

== Guerilla crosswalks ==
In September 2021, residents painted a crosswalk at the intersection of Greenwood Avenue North and North 83rd Street. They were reportedly frustrated from waiting for crossings to be installed. SDOT removed the crossings six months later. Initially planned to be completed in 2021, but delayed as a result of the COVID-19 pandemic and supply chain issues, SDOT painted crossings in October 2022.

Community members painted a zebra crossing at Harvard Avenue and Olive Way on Capitol Hill on November 14, 2022. SDOT removed the crosswalk two days later. SDOT said in a statement, "We have heard the message loudly and clearly that the public wants more crossing and safety improvements. We appreciate the passion which has driven someone to paint their own crosswalk, however this is not the right way to voice your desire for change." On social media, the agency said, "we are always interested in working with residents and businesses on ways to make walking safer and more comfortable and will evaluate the intersection to see how we might replace the unauthorized crosswalk. In the meantime, it will have to be removed."

Council member Andrew Lewis criticized SDOT's decision to remove the crosswalk.

== See also ==
- Crosswalks in North America
- Pedestrian crossings in Portland, Oregon
