= 2018 Bayshore Boulevard crash =

Traffic accident in Florida

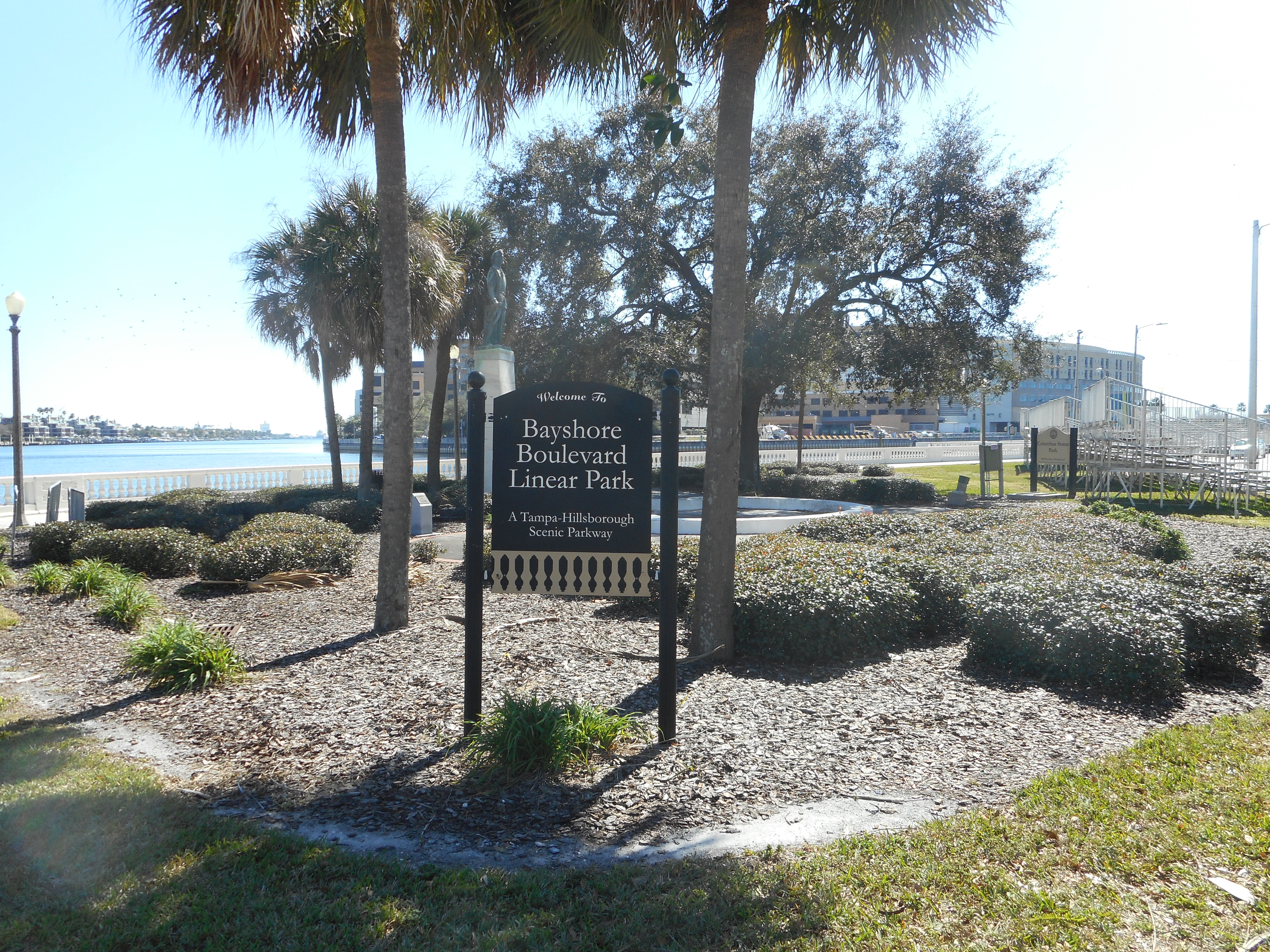
- Bayshore Boulevard in 2016

Details
- Date: May 23, 2018; 8 years ago Late morning
- Location: Bayshore Boulevard, South Tampa, Florida, U.S.
- Cause: Street racing

Statistics
- Vehicles: 2018 Ford Mustang; 2015 Nissan Altima
- Deaths: 2

The 2018 Bayshore Boulevard crash was a fatal traffic collision caused by street racing, which occurred shortly before noon on May 23, 2018, on Bayshore Boulevard in South Tampa, Florida, United States. The event was the subject of a large amount of online activity, causing it to garner substantial media coverage.

18-year-old Cameron Herrin and 17-year-old John Barrineau had been racing each other on Bayshore Boulevard when Herrin's vehicle collided with two pedestrians who were crossing towards West Knights Avenue. 24-year-old Jessica Raubenolt died at the scene and her 21-month-old daughter Lillia Raubenolt died in the hospital the following day. They were not within a marked crosswalk, but still had right of way because they were crossing at the location of a pedestrian ramp. Herrin was driving a 2018 Ford Mustang and was carrying his 20-year-old brother Tristan Herrin as a passenger, while Barrineau was driving a 2015 Nissan Altima. Multiple witnesses reported observing the cars speeding and weaving through traffic shortly before the crash. The Mustang's black box revealed that he had been driving at 102 miles per hour in the moments preceding the crash despite a posted speed limit of 40 mph. Immediately prior to striking the pedestrians, Herrin's vehicle rapidly reduced speed to 30-40 mph, indicating hard braking.

The incident prompted local authorities to reduce the speed on Bayshore Boulevard to 35 mph.

== Background ==
The victims, Jessica and Lillia Raubenolt, were from Ohio and were in South Tampa to visit family.

Cameron Herrin and John Barrineau had graduated from Tampa Catholic High School two days before the incident. Herrin had received the Mustang as a high school graduation gift. They were en route to a local gym when the incident occurred.

== Legal outcomes ==
=== Criminal ===
Cameron Herrin and John Barrineau were both charged with two counts of felony vehicular homicide. Herrin pled guilty and was sentenced to 24 years in prison by Judge Christopher Nash. Barrineau's attorneys negotiated a plea deal with prosecutors which saw him sentenced to six years in prison and 15 years of probation. Barrineau received a lighter sentence in part because he was not driving the vehicle which directly caused the crash. His plea deal was approved by the Raubenolt family.

Prosecutors presented evidence that Cameron Herrin had a history of driving at reckless speeds, including once when he reached a speed of 162 mph on I-75. This likely factored into his heavy sentence.

==== Appeals ====
Herrin's attorneys have made several attempts at appealing to reduce his sentence, but none have thus far been successful.

=== Civil ===
Despite Cameron Herrin being 18 years of age at the time of the crash, and therefore not a minor, the Mustang was registered in his mother's name and thus opened the whole Herrin family to civil liability.

Family members of the victims received at least $6.4 million in a civil settlement. The Herrin family paid $500,000 out of pocket while the Barrineau family paid $200,000. Additionally, the Herrin family had liability insurance and umbrella insurance policies that paid $500,000 and $5 million respectively. The Barrineau family also had an insurance policy that paid $200,000. The financial burden of the settlement reportedly caused the Herrin family to sell their home and move into a smaller one.

== Online support for Herrin ==
Following Herrin's sentencing there was a large amount of online activity in his support, with the hashtags "#justiceforcameronherrin" and "#freecameron" trending on Twitter and TikTok. While some of the accounts promoting the campaign are believed to be authentic by experts, many of them are likely bots. Shelby Grossman of the Stanford Internet Observatory characterized the behavior as "a mix of genuine support for [Herrin] and suspicious activity likened to Middle East digital marketing firms". Much of the support seemed to focus on his physical appearance, such as comments suggesting that he was "too cute" for prison. His mother described many of the online supporters as having "almost like an obsession, an unhealthy obsession".

By July 2021 TikTok videos about Herrin had amassed more than 1.7 billion views and over 100,000 tweets had been posted about him. Herrin's TikTok account, despite not containing any posts, surpassed 2 million followers. A Change.org petition asking for Herrin to receive "another chance in court" gained more than 28,000 signatures.
