= Alfred Swann =

Alfred Reuben Swann (1843–1926) was an American real estate developer in Tampa, Florida. Originally from Tennessee, he was joined in Tampa's land-development business in 1905 by fellow Tennessean Eugene Holtsinger. He was involved in the development of New Suburb Beautiful, the area along Bayshore Boulevard; and through his Swann Terminal Company had a large role in developing the port area south of Ybor City (marshland once known as The Estuary). He also owned citrus groves and areas for timber. Swann was an influential civic and business leader with a home along Bayshore Boulevard. J.T. Swann was founded by his son James T. Swann.

Swann was born on the family plantation in Sandy Ridge, Tennessee to John and Sarah (Austell) Swann on September 24, 1843, and he was to live to be nearly eighty-three years old. He was studying at Maurey Academy in Dandridge when the U.S. Civil War started and he enlisted; serving with Wheeler's Cavalry until May 3, 1865, and rising to the rank of colonel.
