= Eugene Holtsinger =

American real estate developer

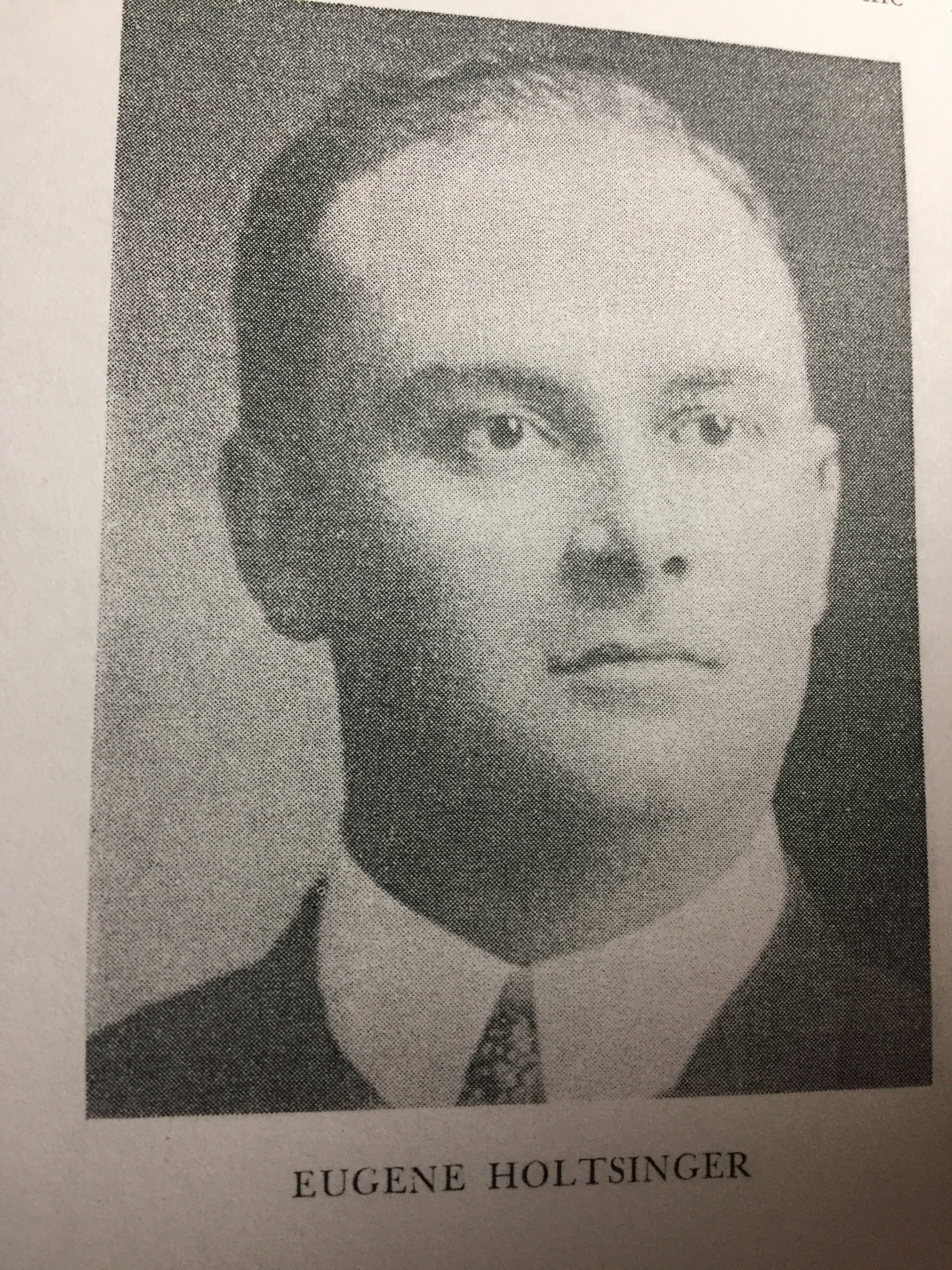

Eugene Holtsinger (July 7, 1868 - Dec 14, 1916) was a real estate developer in Tampa, Florida. He helped create Bayshore Boulevard and its first subdivision: Suburb Beautiful. A bridge over the Hillsborough River is named after him.

Holtsinger moved to Tampa in 1905 from Dandridge, Tennessee and joined fellow Tennessean Alfred Swann in the land-development business, constructing homes in Hyde Park, Tampa, Suburb Beautiful, Ridgewood Park, Tampa, Ybor City and West Tampa. He also developed the area now known as Sparkman Wharf formerly known as Channelside. He owned the Tampa-Sulphur Springs Traction Co. and was the builder of the Garcia Avenue Bridge for streetcars running between Ybor City and West Tampa (replaced in 1959 by the bridge that bears his name).[1] To fill in the low lands along the waterfront, Mr Holtsinger had a dredge constructed in Tampa and organized the Hillsborough Dredging Company.[2] Later Holtsinger acquired other dredges and the company handled many dredging contracts in the Tampa Bay region. One of the dredges, the Holtsinger, was used in the development of the waterfront at Sarasota.

Mr. Holtsinger was born in 1868 in Dandridge, Tennessee, the son of George W. Holtsinger and Loretta A. E. Dobson Holtsinger. He was educated at Maury Academy, in Dandridge, and when 18 years old taught school in Shady Grove, Tenn. Holtsinger then studied law, at the University of Virginia, and was admitted to the Tennessee bar before he was 21. Before he became of age he also served as clerk of the chancery court of Dandridge during the illness of his grandfather who was then the clerk. After being admitted to the bar, Mr. Holtsinger practiced law in Dandridge in the office of the law firm of Pickle, Turner and Holtsinger who had their main offices in Knoxville. Eugene Holtsinger was the attorney for the Southern Railroad for many years.

Shortly after the turn of the century Mr Holtsinger acquired large tracts of timber lands in southern Georgia and Florida and in 1904 moved to Wachula, Florida where he established a turpentine still and large mill and organized the Wachula Manufacturing Company for making citrus and vegetable crates. Retaining his interests in Wachula, Mr Holtsinger came to Tampa in 1905 and for a short time was a law partner of John P. Wall, Jr. Thereafter he devoted almost all of his time to the real estate and investment business.

In 1906 Mr Holtsinger entered into partnerships with A. R. Swann, of Dandridge, whom he had persuaded to come to Tampa, and they formed the firm of Swann & Holtsinger. The firm purchased the Morrison Grove property in the Hyde Park section and 52 acres adjoining, along the waterfront, and proceeded to develop Suburb Beautiful, converting mud flats into the finest residential district of the city. Bayshore Drive, the forerunner of the Bayshore Boulevard, was created during the development work. Mr Holtsinger was active in all operations.

Mr. Holtsinger was the founder of the Cosmopolitan Bank & Trust Company which later was sold to the Bank of Ybor City. He also took a leading part in the development of Sulphur Springs and was one of the principal backers of the Tampa & Sulpher Springs Traction Company. Foreseeing Tampa's future harbor development, he purchased a large tract in 1909 which now is the main section of the estuary. Becoming one of Tampa's most active builders, he constructed hundreds of homes on Suburb Beautiful, West Tampa and Ybor City.

During the business recession of 1915, at a time when the activities of Swann & Holtsinger were greatly extended, the firm suffered severe financial reverses and was thrown into the hands of a receiver. Mr Holtsinger, one of the most far sighted developers in Tampa's history, lost heavily. Weakened by diabetes, only a few years before insulin treatment became available, he died December 14, 1916.

Mr. Holtsinger was survived by his widow, the former Miss Mary E. Meek, of Strawberry Plain, Tenn., whom he had married on July 14, 1892, and survived by three sons: Edgar, George and Clarence.
