= Rainbow crossings in Seattle =

Pedestrian crossings in Seattle, Washington, U.S.

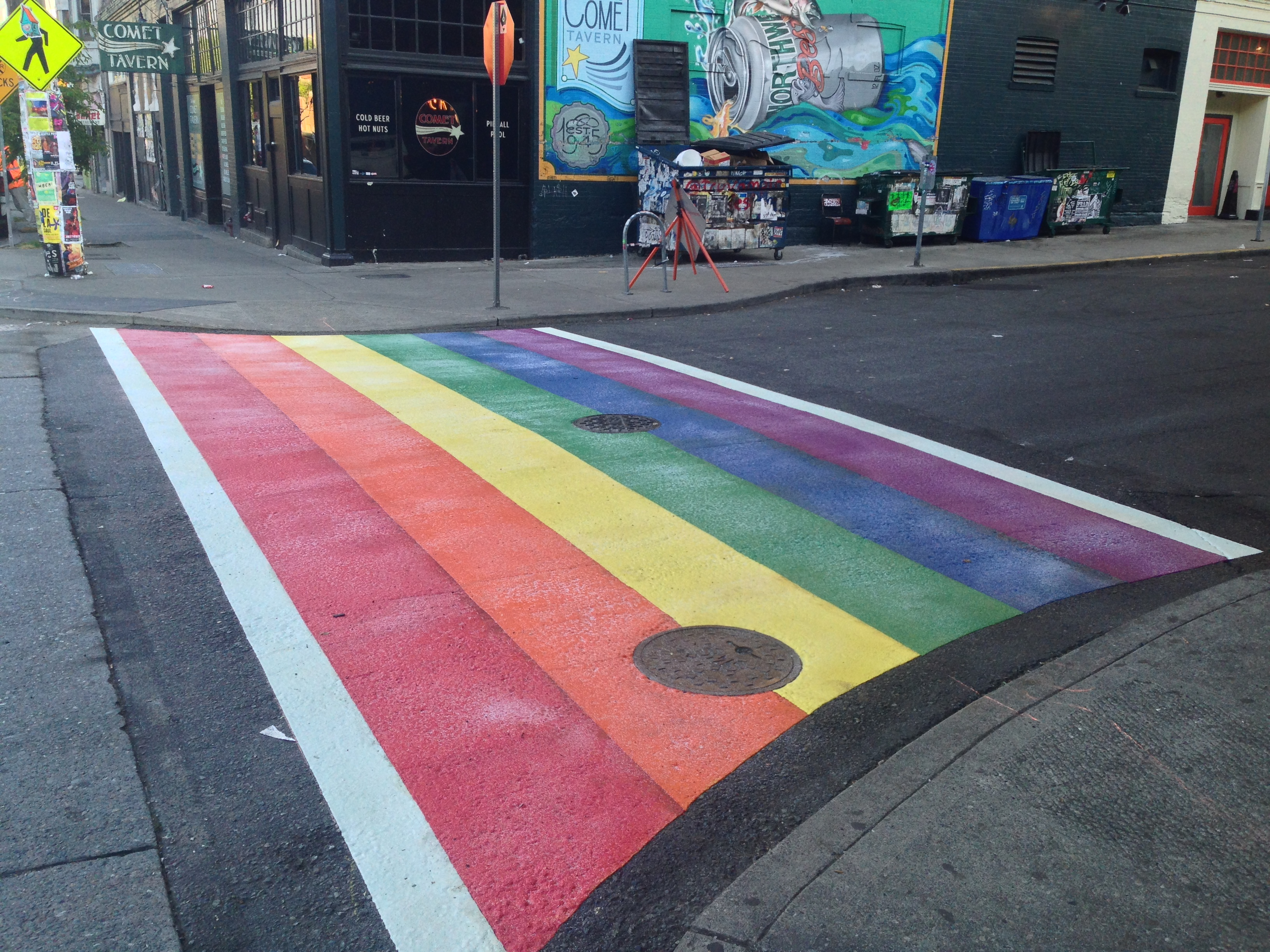
- One of Seattle's rainbow crossings in 2015
- Completed: 2015
- Location: Seattle, Washington, U.S.

A series of rainbow crossings have been painted in Seattle, in the U.S. state of Washington. According to The Seattle Times, the colorful pedestrian crossings "signal inclusiveness all year-round". Since the rainbow crossings were installed in 2015, more artistic crossings have appeared throughout the city.

== History ==
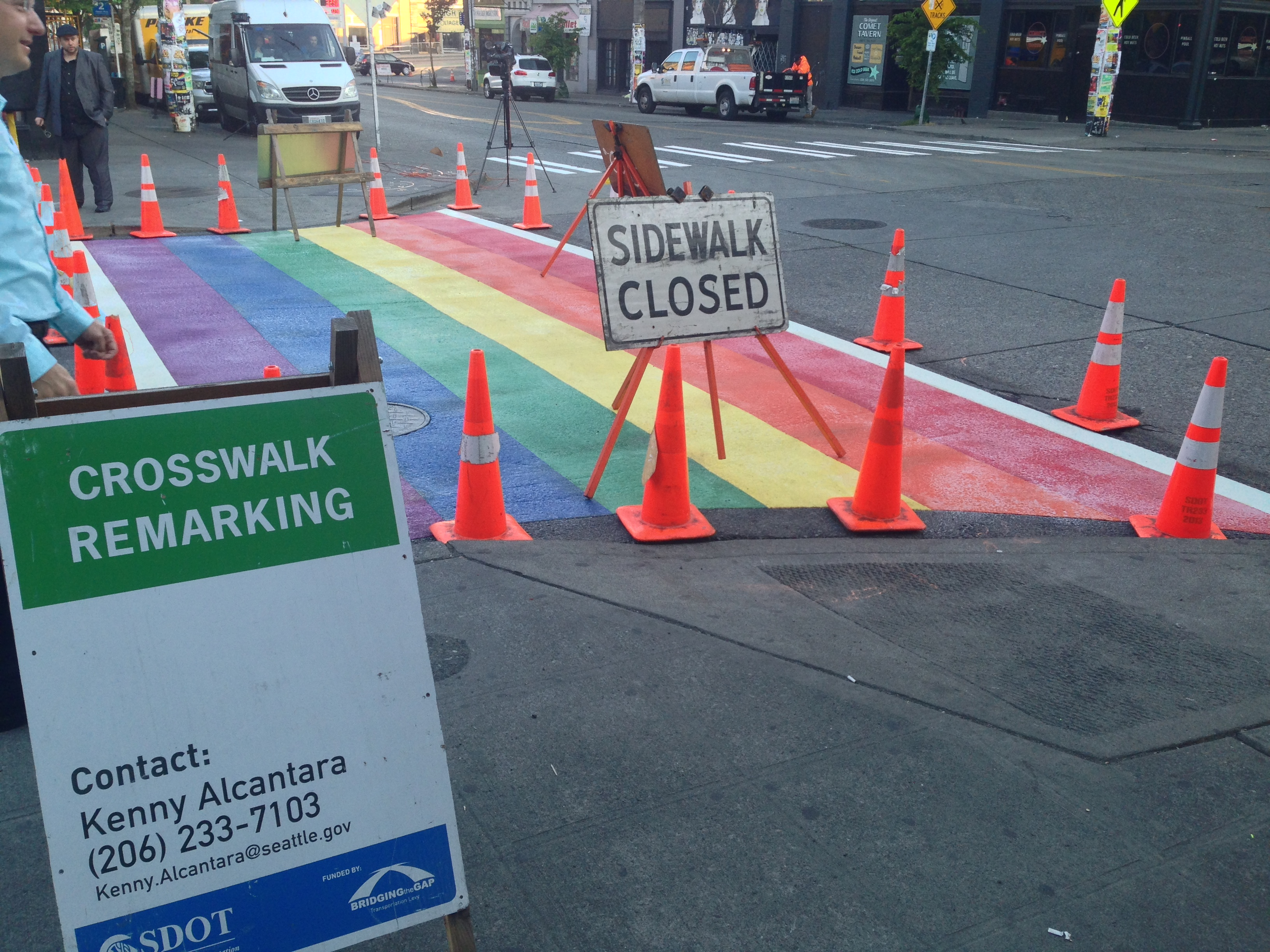
One of the crossings in June 2015

In 2015, eleven rainbow crossings were painted at six intersections on Capitol Hill, on Pike and Pine streets between 11th Avenue and Broadway. According to Out, the colorful pedestrian crossings were created "as a bold symbol of the city's LGBT community" and "will act as a reminder of the city's ongoing commitment to LGBT awareness and acceptance". Costing approximately $6,000 each, the crosswalks were paid for by local developers.

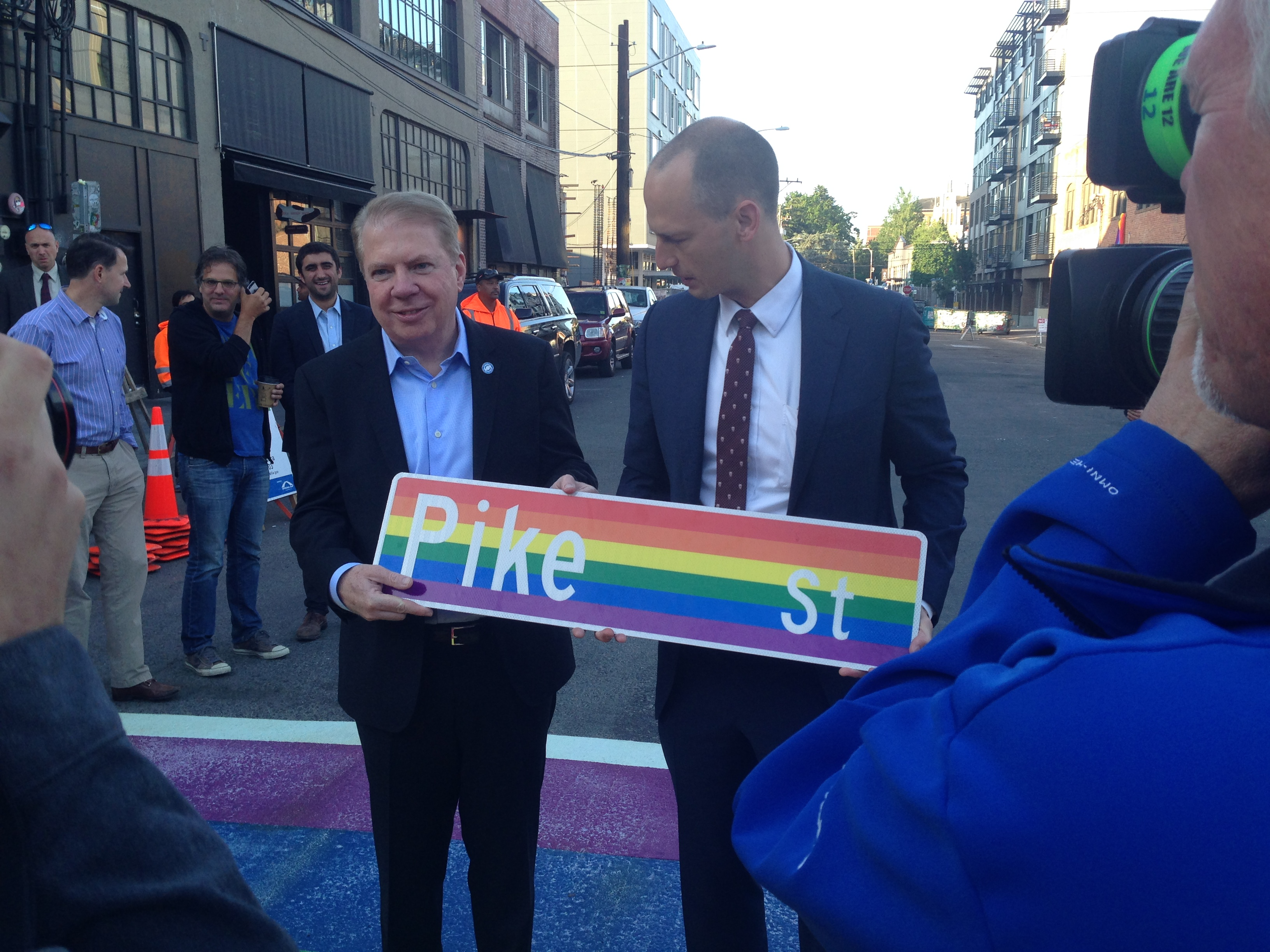
Mayor Ed Murray (left) and Seattle Department of Transportation director Scott Kubly (right) holding a rainbow-colored sign for Pike Street at the unveiling of the rainbow crossings in 2015

The crossings were part of Mayor Ed Murray's action plan to improve safety for the LGBT community. The crosswalks had been discussed "for some time" but were delayed by funding and logistics issues. At the unveiling ceremony, he said, "it says something about this neighborhood and it also says something about Seattle. This is a city of very diverse neighborhoods throughout with different character." The crosswalks were expected to last from three to five years, and inspired other colorful crossings throughout the city.

While the crosswalks were privately funded, talk show host Dori Monson argued that if the city was able to find funding for rainbow crossings, then there should also be funding for police body cameras and a gunshot recognition system.

The Federal Highway Administration and U.S. Department of Transportation said the crosswalks were potentially unsafe. Engineer Dongho Chang from the Seattle Department of Transportation said the crosswalks "are statistically far safer than the ones mandated by the federal government".

In 2024, one of the rainbow crossings was vandalized and repainted. A rainbow-tiled bus platform on 15th Ave E in Capitol Hill was also hit with the same white paint. A year later, the nearby Black Lives Matter street mural was vandalized in a similar manner and restored.

== See also ==
- List of LGBTQ monuments and memorials
- Pride flag
- Queer art
