= Pedestrian crossing flag =

Flags held by pedestrians to increase visibility

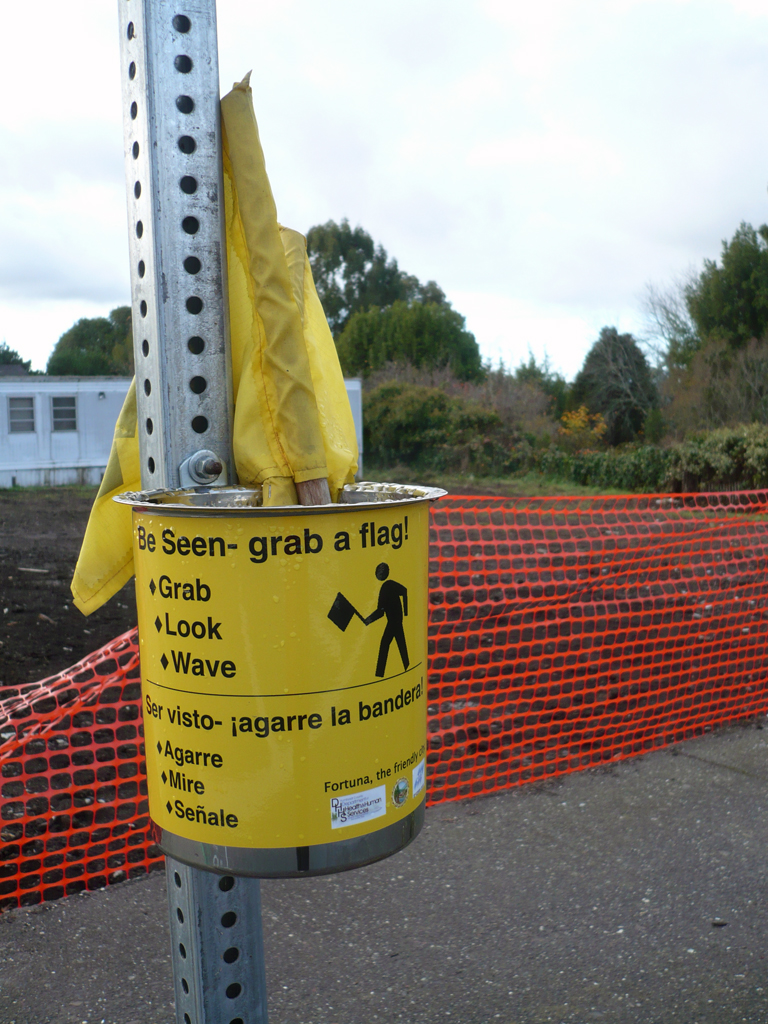
Box of pedestrian crossing flags in Fortuna, California, 2013

A pedestrian crossing flag are flags that are used by pedestrians to increase visibility and alert drivers of their presence while they cross the street. They are usually used in the United States.

== History ==
The first pedestrian crossing flags were used around 2000 at pedestrian crossings in Salt Lake City. The flags are meant to be used by crossing pedestrians to alert drivers of their presence while crossing to avoid being hit by a car. The program started by promoting 100 crosswalks. Texas Tech University reported that the flags made cars yield 74% of the time at four sites.

The flags started being used by other cities in the United States. Cities such as Kirkland, Washington, McCall, Idaho, Berkeley, California, Las Vegas, Nevada, Cupertino, California and Seattle, Washington, had sponsorships for pedestrian crossing flags at crosswalks. Seattle ended the program in 2008 after not much usage by pedestrians.

On April 1, 2024, a campaign began in Granville Island, with bricks being placed at pedestrian crossings, as opposed to flags. Other such crossings were implemented in Arlington, Virginia.

== Criticism ==
Bloomberg News described the use of pedestrian crossing flags as "demeaning", and make pedestrians feel embarrassed for needing to carry a flag for walking.

A statistic from Berkely says that only 2% of pedestrians used the crossing flags. Multiple collisions still occurred after the flags were installed into cities; the city of Bridgeport, Connecticut, investigated eleven crashes involving thirteen people walking, with one case resulting in death. The flags also tend to be stolen. The flags are moved by which direction pedestrians walk by, which can cause the flags to end on one side with none on the other.

== Gallery ==
Pedestrian crossing flags

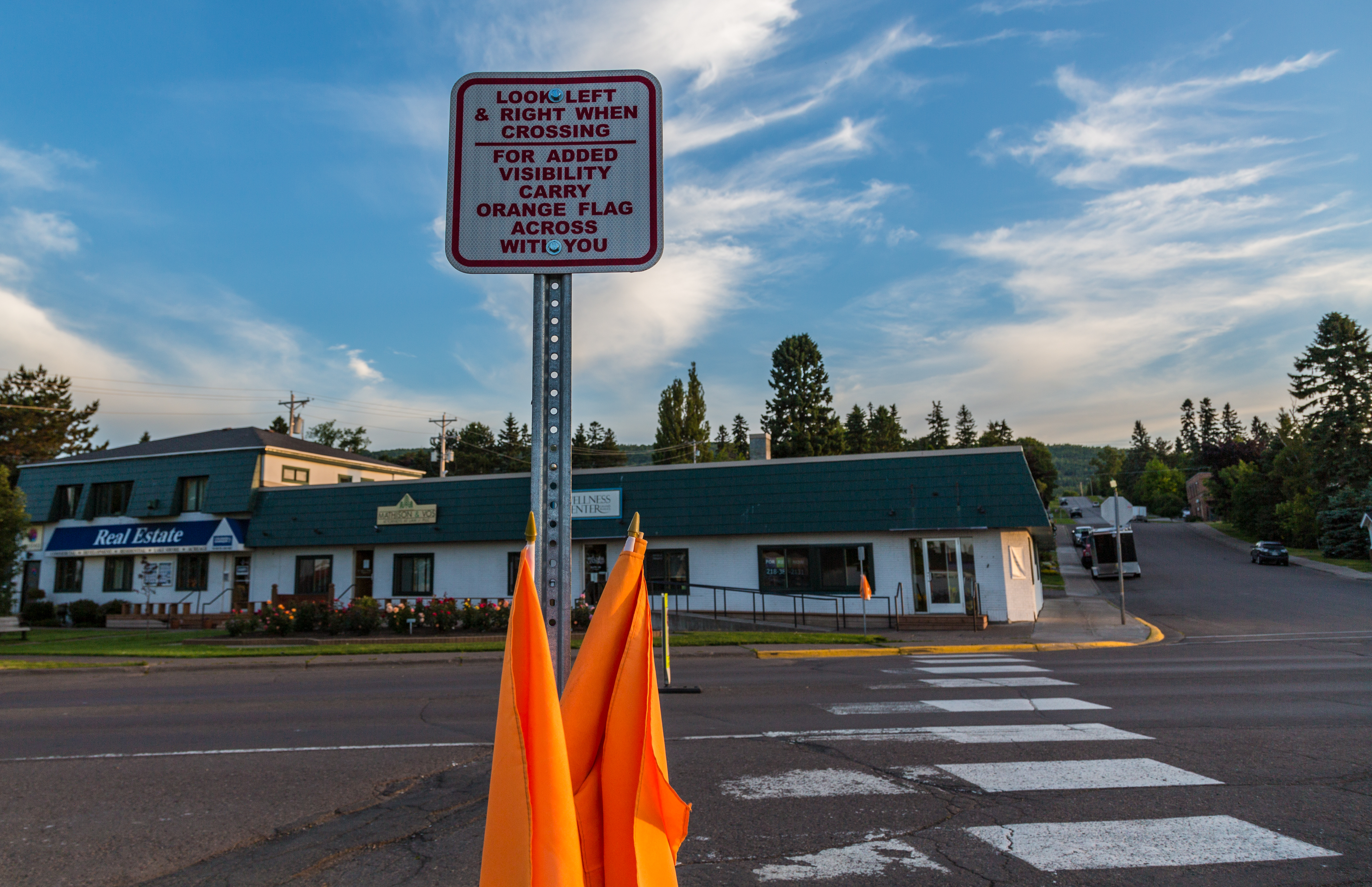
Box of orange pedestrian crossing flags in Grand Marais, Minnesota, 2017

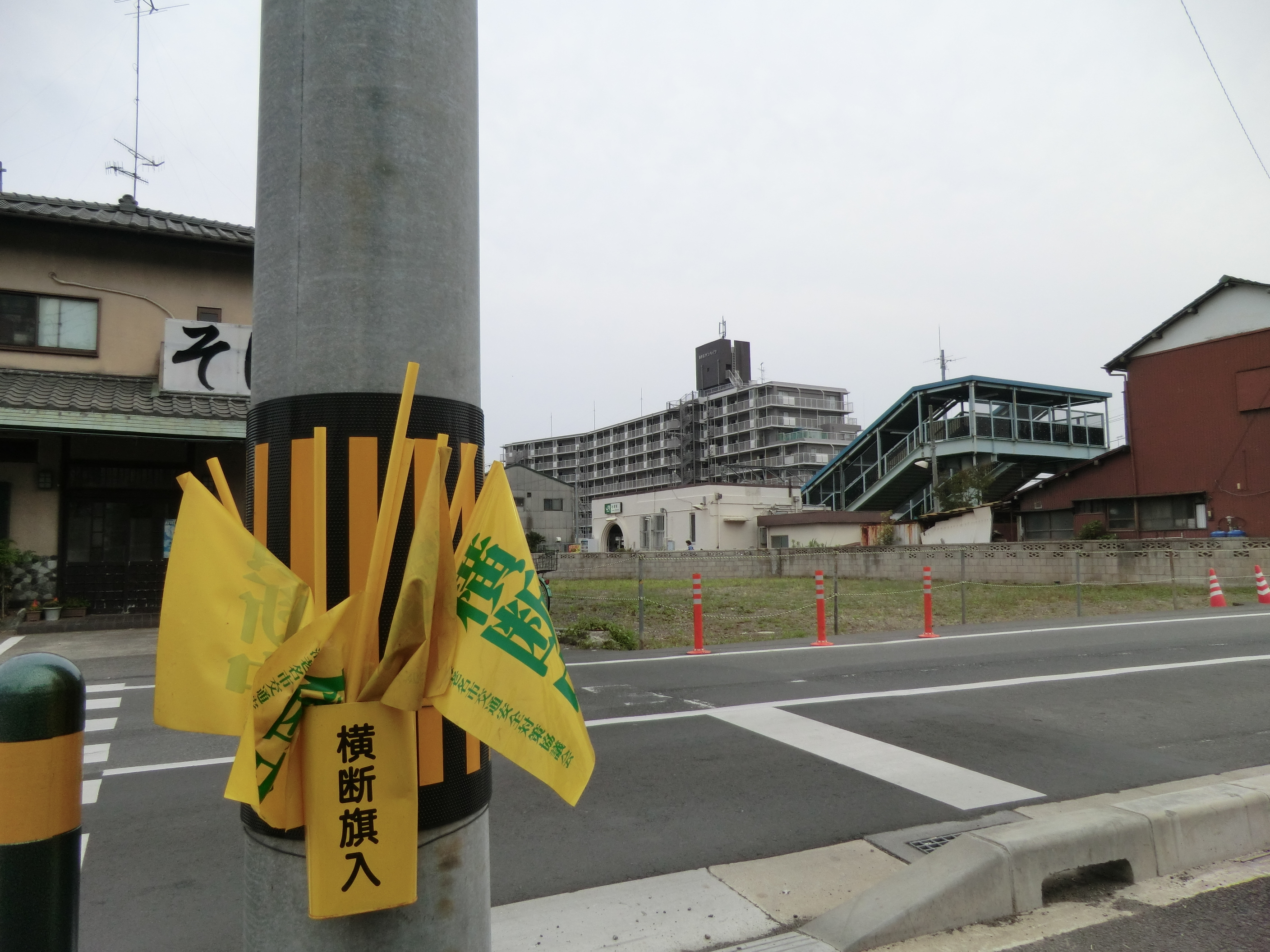
Box of yellow pedestrian crossing flags in Japan, 2013
