= Portland Orange =

Portland Orange (desaturated approximation)
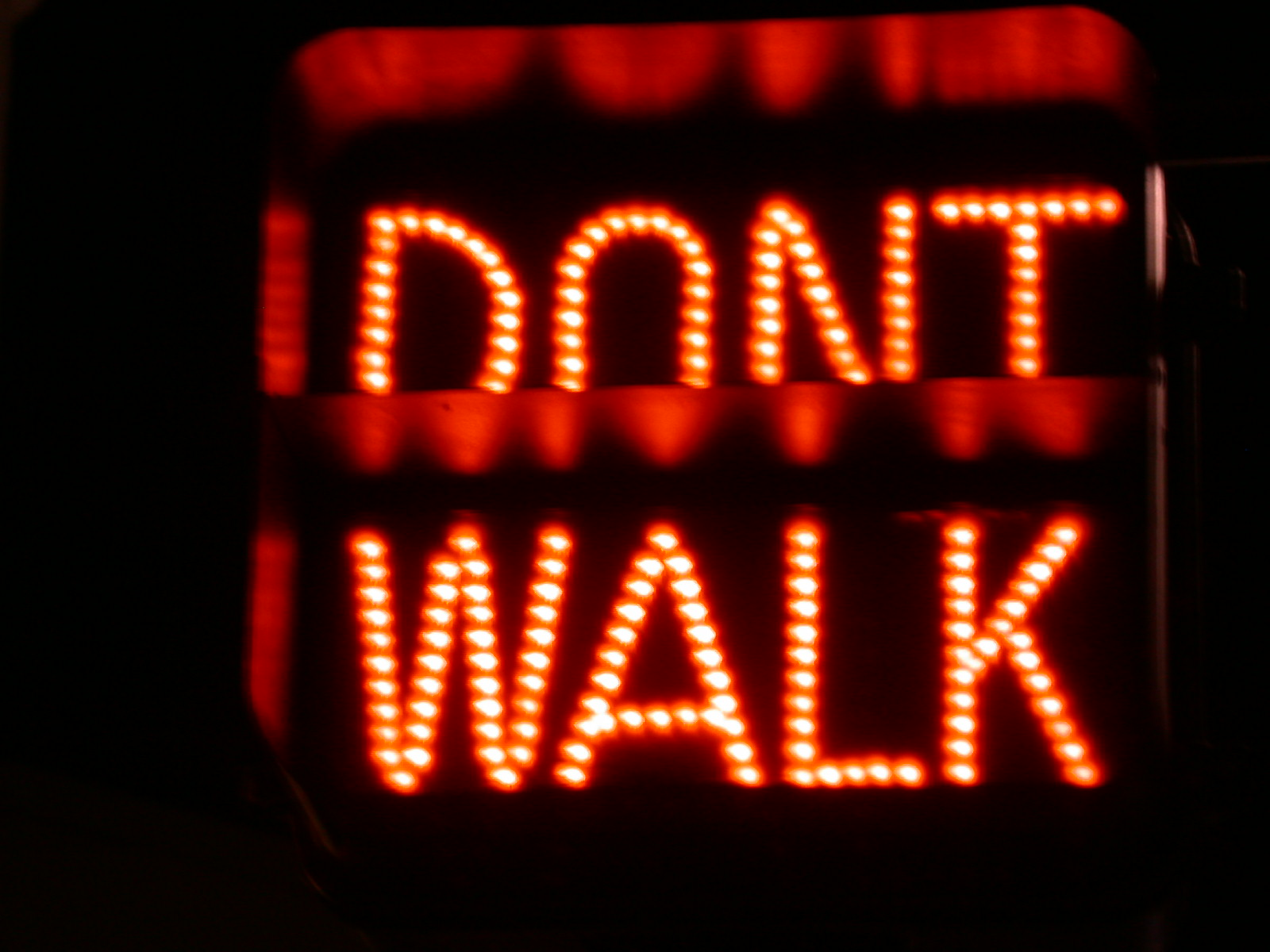

Color coordinates
- Hex triplet: #FF5A36
- sRGB^{B} (r, g, b): (255, 90, 54)
- HSV (h, s, v): (11°, 79%, 100%)
- CIELCh_{uv} (L, C, h): (61, 139, 17°)
- Source: CIECD
- ISCC–NBS descriptor: Vivid reddish orange
- B: Normalized to [0–255] (byte)

Portland Orange is the color of light emitted by the dont walk phase of pedestrian crossing signals in the United States and Canada. The color was chosen to avoid confusion with regular traffic lights in conditions of poor visibility.

Its chromaticity is specified by the Institute of Transportation Engineers in that body's technical standards, along with lunar white for the walk lights. Its application is stipulated in the U.S. federal Manual on Uniform Traffic Control Devices. Various jurisdictional standards also require Portland Orange for dont walk signs.

The color can be created with some LEDs, and the ITE specifies the precision of its wavelength to 3 nanometers. In practice, the most brilliant color of gaseous tubing is similar to Portland Orange.

== International application ==
Portland Orange is generally not used outside the United States and Canada. In most of the world, red, or another specified color, is used for the dont walk symbol instead of Portland Orange.
