= Guerrilla crosswalk =

Unauthorized pedestrian crossing markings

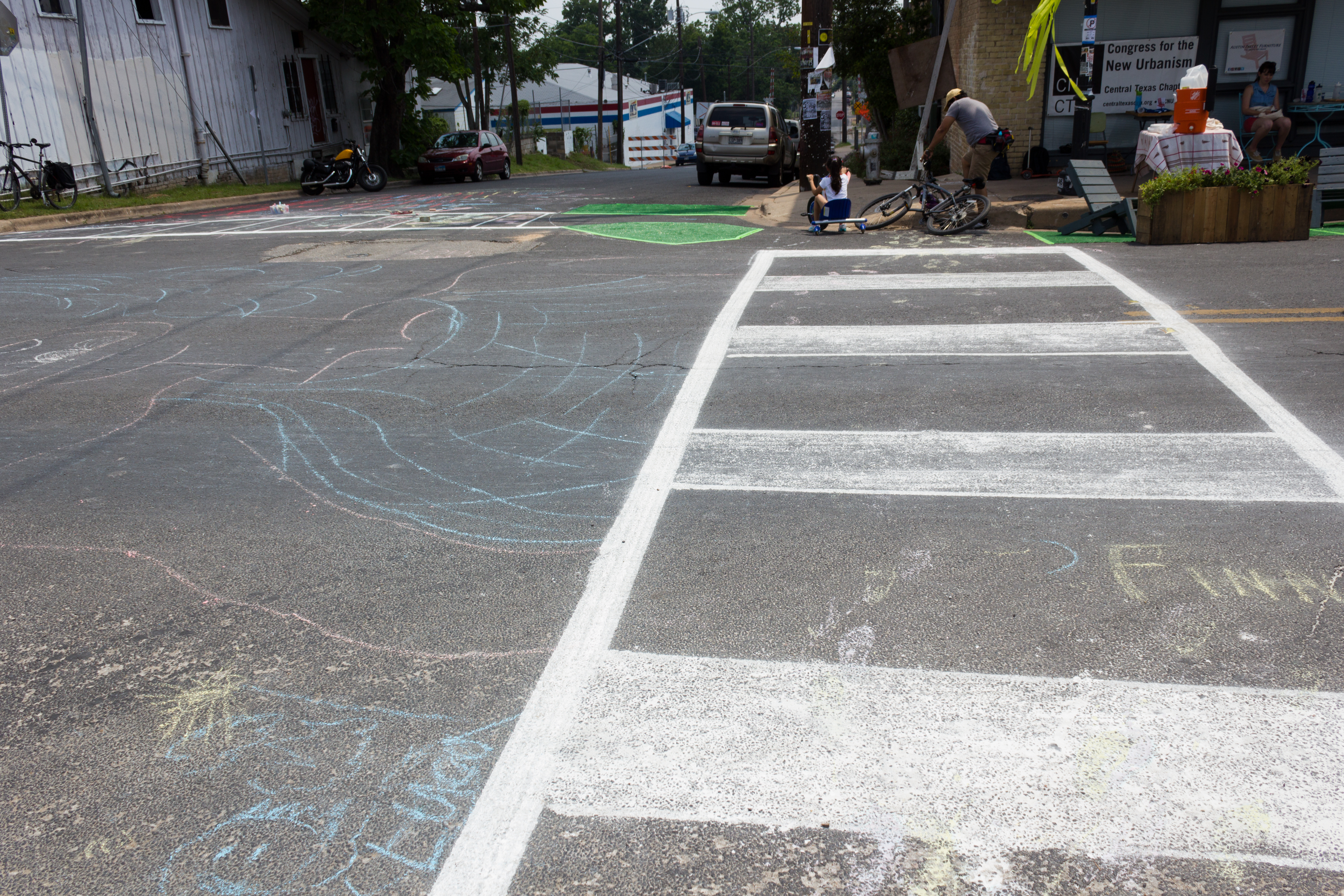
Chalked crossing drawn during 2013 Viva Streets Austin

A guerrilla crosswalk is a pedestrian crossing that has been modified or created without jurisdictional approval, and with the intent of improving pedestrian and other non-automobile safety. These interventions are a common strategy within tactical urbanism, a type of low-cost, often temporary change to the built environment intended to improve local livability. Guerrilla crosswalks have been noted in news articles since at least 2009 and have become more well known as an urban strategy in recent years. The first known example of guerrilla crosswalks can be found in Canada in 1987 when social activists John Valeriote and Erik Veldman created a crosswalk in Guelph, Ontario for students to safely cross a busy road in front of their school.

In many jurisdictions, guerrilla crosswalk groups exist in a state of low-intensity conflict with the local government, which typically removes the crosswalks and occasionally arrests the guerrillas.

== Background ==
Walkability and quality of life indicators are common topics in urban planners' and urban advocates' vocabulary in recent years. With the increasing body of research focused on measuring, and in some cases, marketing the walkability and quality of life in cities, citizens and decision-makers alike are focused on improving intersections, sidewalks, and streetscapes. Tactical urbanism is focused generally on small-scale, quick, and low-cost changes to a place. While some might consider it illegal, it is utilized by both activists and city planners alike when pilot programs and improvements are required immediately and when budget is a significant constraint.

Many guerrilla tactics react to the delays and inefficiencies in attempting to follow proper or legal channels. While guerrilla crosswalks are usually quickly removed, the speed of the removal is often used to point out that cities do have the money to install and remove crosswalks.

This tactic is often a response to unsafe conditions at the interface of pedestrian and automobile circulation and is not without its opponents. One Public Works official commented in this way, "These changes to City streets are illegal, potentially unsafe and adding to the City's costs of maintenance and repair.... There is potential liability and risk management claims to both the City and the individuals involved." Crosswalks are a signal to drivers that pedestrians may be present. They are intended to group pedestrians for crossing at a safe time. The introduction of new crosswalks can be confusing to drivers and potentially give pedestrians a false sense of security.

== Case studies and examples ==
=== Los Angeles ===
Crosswalk Collective LA, a group active throughout Los Angeles, has painted dozens of crosswalks since early 2022. In a statement to National Public Radio, the group stated that "We […] have tried for years to request crosswalks and other safe streets infrastructure the official way. At every turn, we've been met with delays, excuses, and inaction from our city government, as well as active hostility to safe streets projects from sitting councilmembers."

The group does not publish a full list of painted crosswalks on its website to prevent them from being removed, and in an effort to protect pedestrians. Out of those painted, some crosswalks have been removed, others have been upgraded into formal crosswalks by the City, and others remain in place.

The group's actions have been met with praise on social media by both local residents and those living elsewhere in the United States. The group has published a how-to guide and stencils on their website to facilitate similar efforts elsewhere in the country.

A guerrilla associated with another group, People's Vision Zero, was arrested while painting a crosswalk in 2025.

=== Seattle ===
Guerrilla crosswalks appeared in Seattle in 2021 and 2022. The Seattle Department of Transportation responded by removing the crosswalks. City councilmember Andrew Lewis tweeted in response, "This is infuriating. We have the time and money, apparently, to expediently REMOVE a crosswalk, but it takes years to get around to actually painting one. No wonder neighbors took it upon themselves to act."

=== Baltimore ===
In the Baltimore neighborhood of Hampden, a 2011 repaving project endured longer than planned. After paving was complete, new crosswalks should have been painted, but the task was left undone with the contractor's justification that the cold weather prevented any street striping. This busy intersection was determined to be unsafe by many of the locals. Eventually, one resident took it upon himself to paint the crosswalk lines late at night. The man was thanked by the local city council.

== Similar infrastructure ==
Guerrillas installed stop signs at a Seattle intersection in 2025. The city's transportation department removed them.
