= Crosswalks in North America =

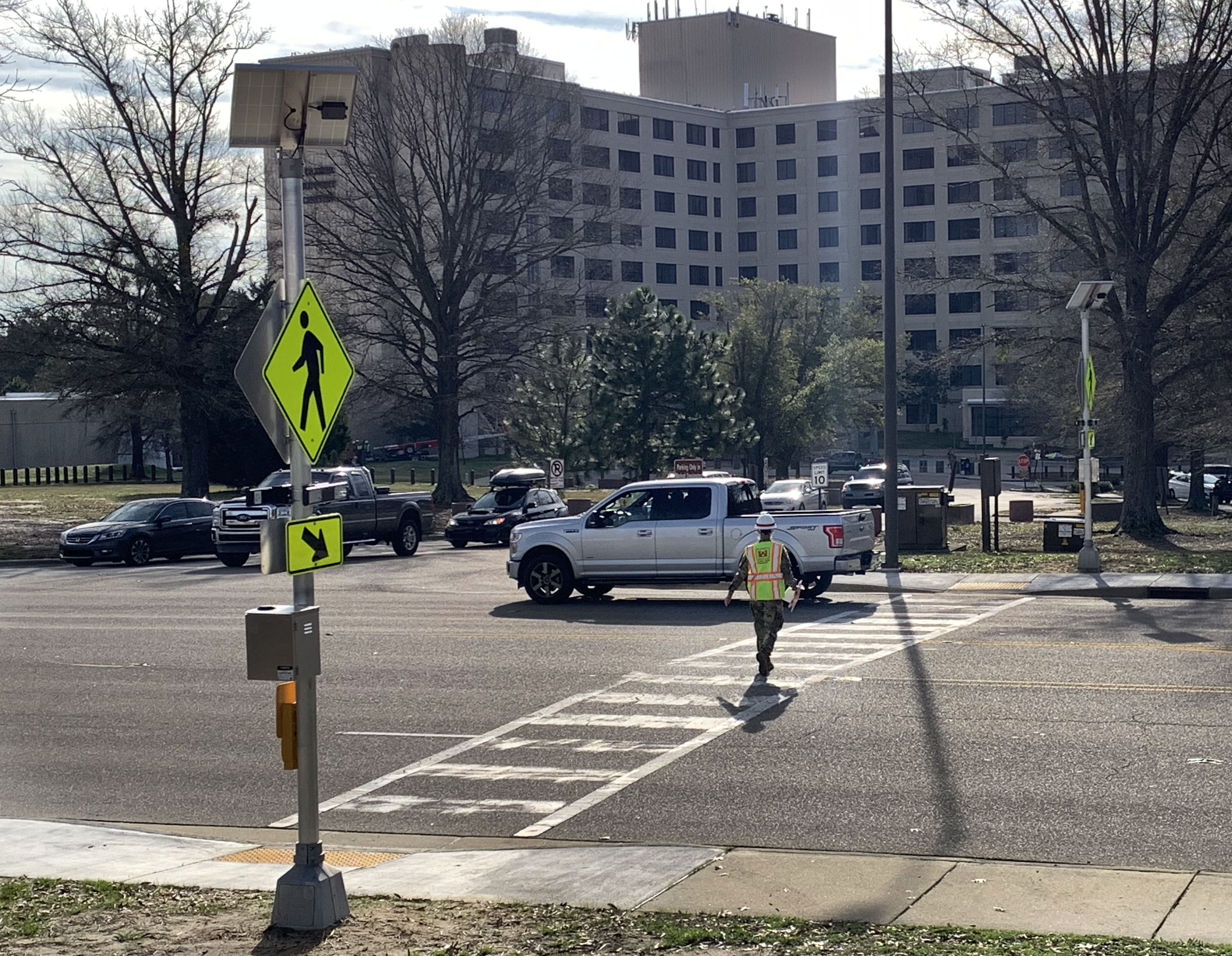
A common-style marked crosswalk with the MUTCD Crosswalk sign

Crosswalks in the United States and Canada are normally found at intersections, though sometimes may be found mid-block. Crosswalk installations must follow the regulations specified in the Manual on Uniform Traffic Control Devices (MUTCD). At signalized intersections, crosswalks may have pedestrian signals which display symbols to mandate when pedestrians may cross the street.

State road rules in the United States usually require a driver to yield the right of way to a pedestrian crossing a road when the pedestrian crosses at a marked crosswalk or an unmarked crosswalk. In some states and cities with jaywalking laws, pedestrians may be restricted from crossing except at a crosswalk and only when the WALK signal is displayed.

== Criteria for installation ==
For crosswalk safety, in the United States there is not much clarity regarding the need for a crosswalk to be marked or unmarked due to the advantages and disadvantages of both approaches, although each city might have its own rules.

== Marked crosswalks ==
Crosswalk pavement marking variants per the U.S. FHWA

In the United States, crosswalks are sometimes marked with white stripes, though many municipalities have slightly different methods, styles, or patterns for doing so. The designs used vary widely between jurisdictions, and often vary even between a city and its county (or local equivalents). There are two main methods for road markings in the United States, as mandated by the 2009 version of the Manual on Uniform Traffic Control Devices (MUTCD). Most frequently, they are marked with two parallel white lines running from one side of the road to the other, with the width of the lines being typically 12 to 24 inches (300 to 610 mm) wide. A third "stop line", which is about the same thickness and extends only across lanes going into the intersection, is usually also present. The stop line acts as the legally mandated stopping point for vehicles, and discourages drivers from stopping in the middle of the crosswalk.

The other method involves the use of the more easily visible "continental stripes" (like the UK's zebra crossings), which are sets of multiple bars across the crosswalk itself that are perpendicular to the direction of crossing. These bars are typically 12 to 24 inches (300 to 610 mm) wide and are set 12 to 24 inches (300 to 610 mm) apart. Crosswalks can use a combination of two parallel white lines and continental stripes to create a "ladder" crosswalk, which is highly visible.

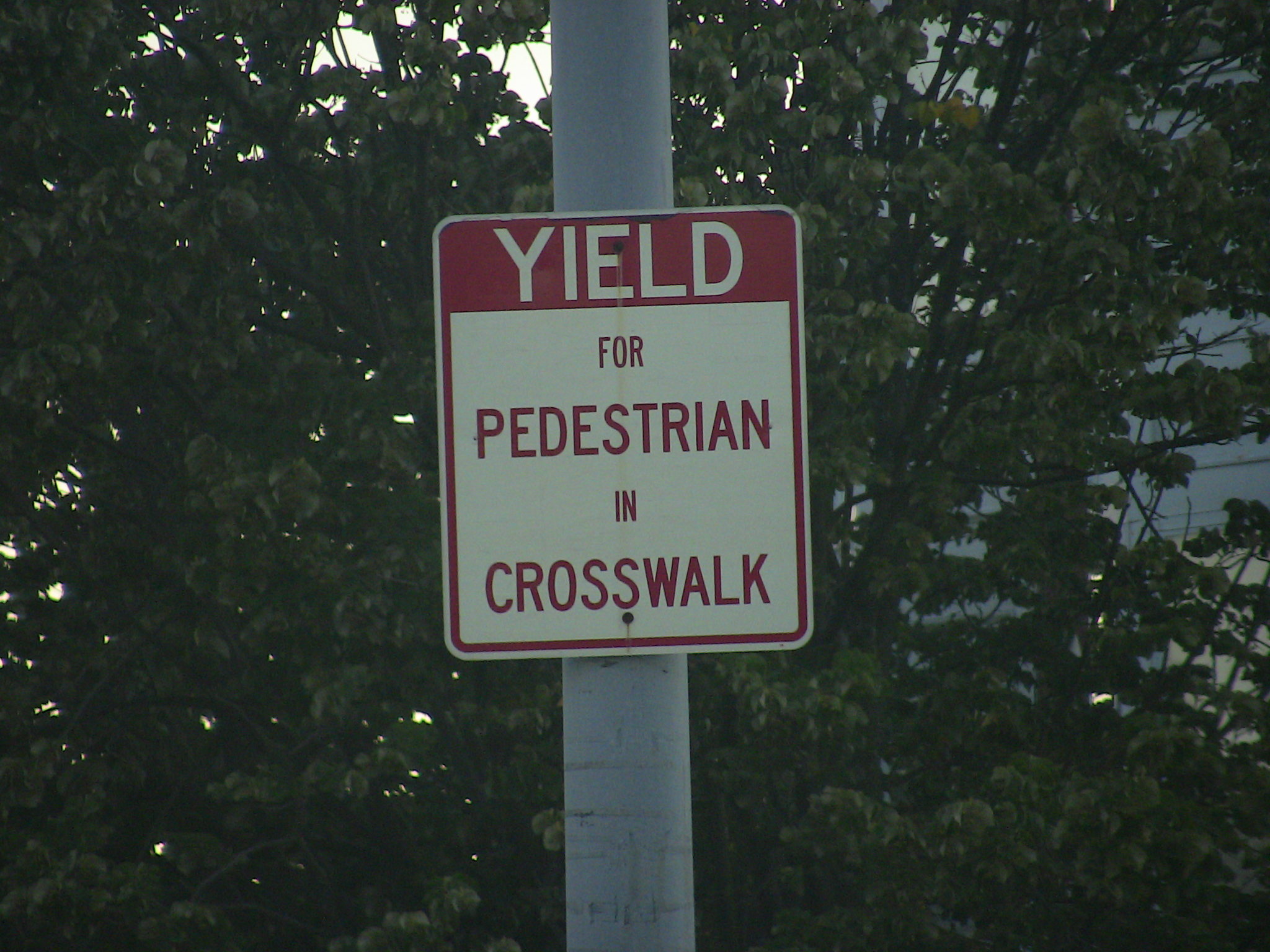
A sign warning motorists to yield to those crossing the crosswalk

Marked crosswalks are usually placed at traffic intersections or crossroads, but are occasionally used at mid-block locations where pedestrian generators are present such as at transit stops, schools, retail, or housing destinations. In the United States, these "mid-block crossings" may include additional regulatory signage such as "PED XING" (for "pedestrian crossing"), flashing yellow beacons, stop or yield signs, or by actuated or automatic signals. Some more innovative crossing treatments include in-pavement flashers, yellow flashing warning lights installed in the roadway, or HAWK beacon—an overhead signal with a pair of red beacons above an amber beacon, when a pedestrian is detected or actuates the device it begins a sequence of amber flashing followed by a solid red, followed by a flashing red phase that allows motorists to proceed, only if the pedestrian(s) are clear of the travel way.

In the United States, crossing laws vary from state to state and sometimes at the local level. All states require vehicles to yield to a pedestrian who has entered a marked crosswalk. Legally speaking, in most states crosswalks exist at all intersections meeting at approximately right angles, whether they are marked or not. To gain the right-of-way in some parts of Canada, however, the pedestrian holds out his hand in a position much like that used to shake hands, and steps off the curb. The province of Ontario enacted a law in 2016 that mandates that drivers and bicyclists come to a complete stop at pedestrian "crossovers"—ladder-style crosswalks that are sometimes designated with overhead signs or lights—as well as crosswalks with school crossing guards.

== Signalized intersections ==
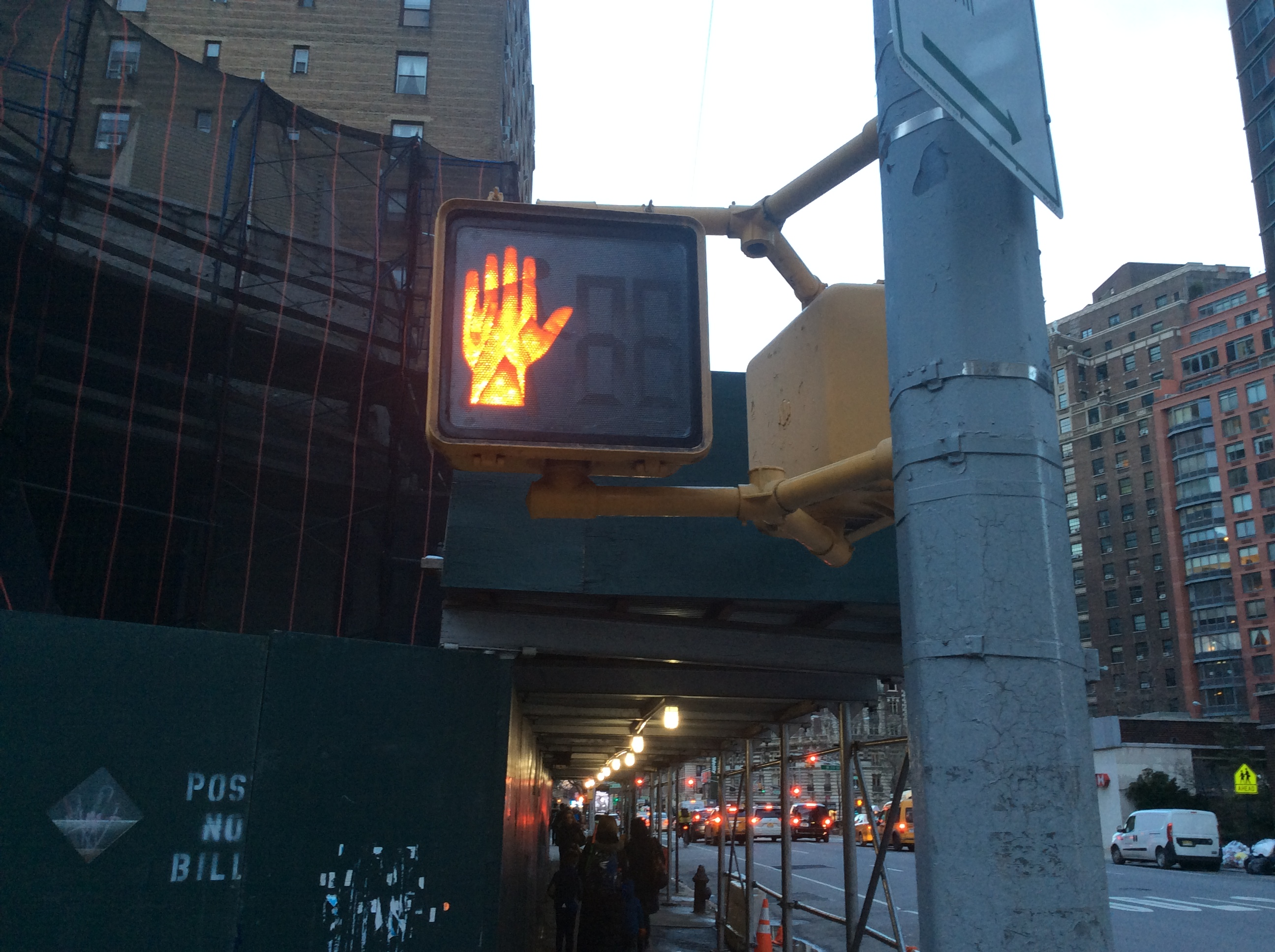
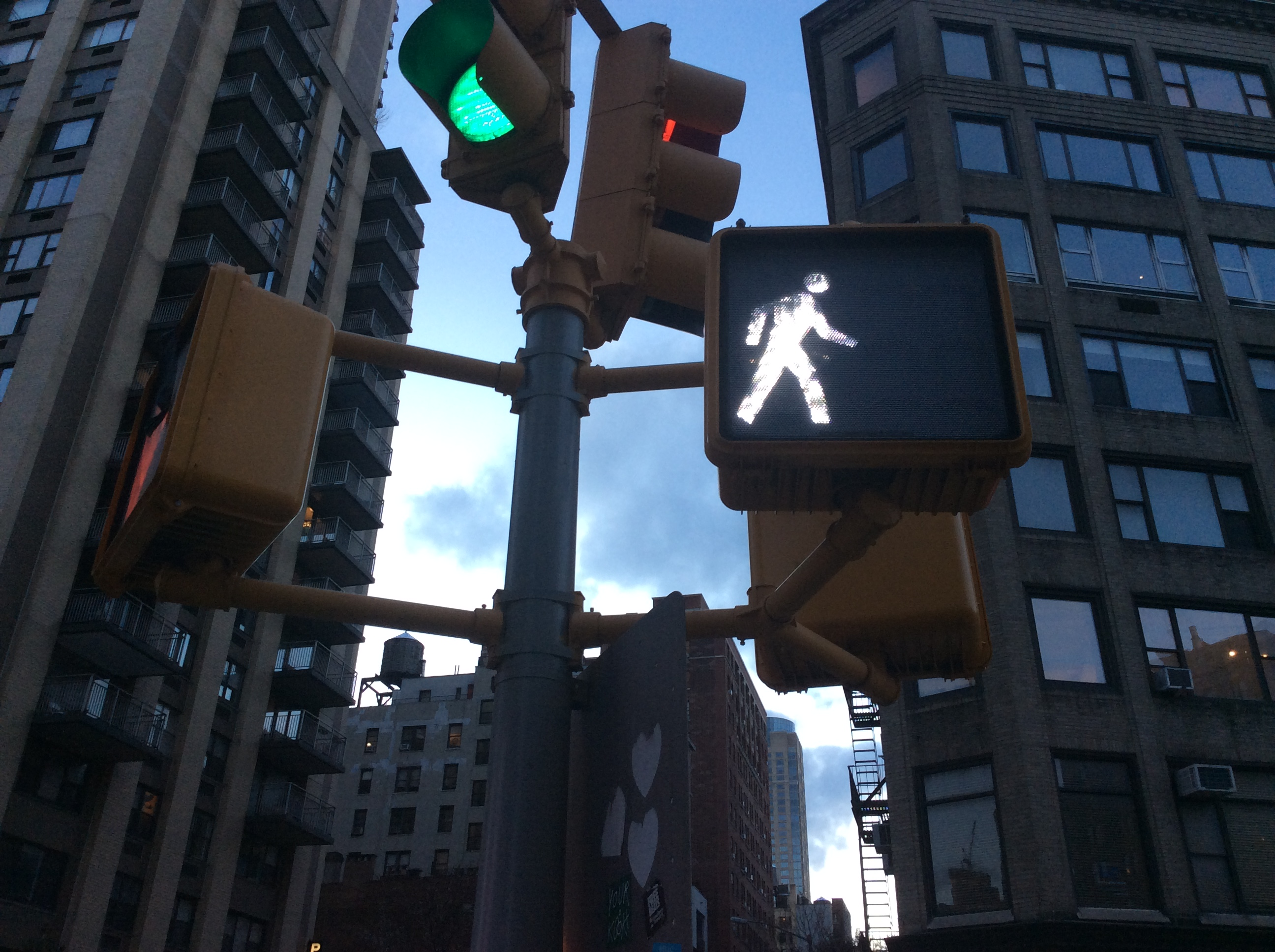
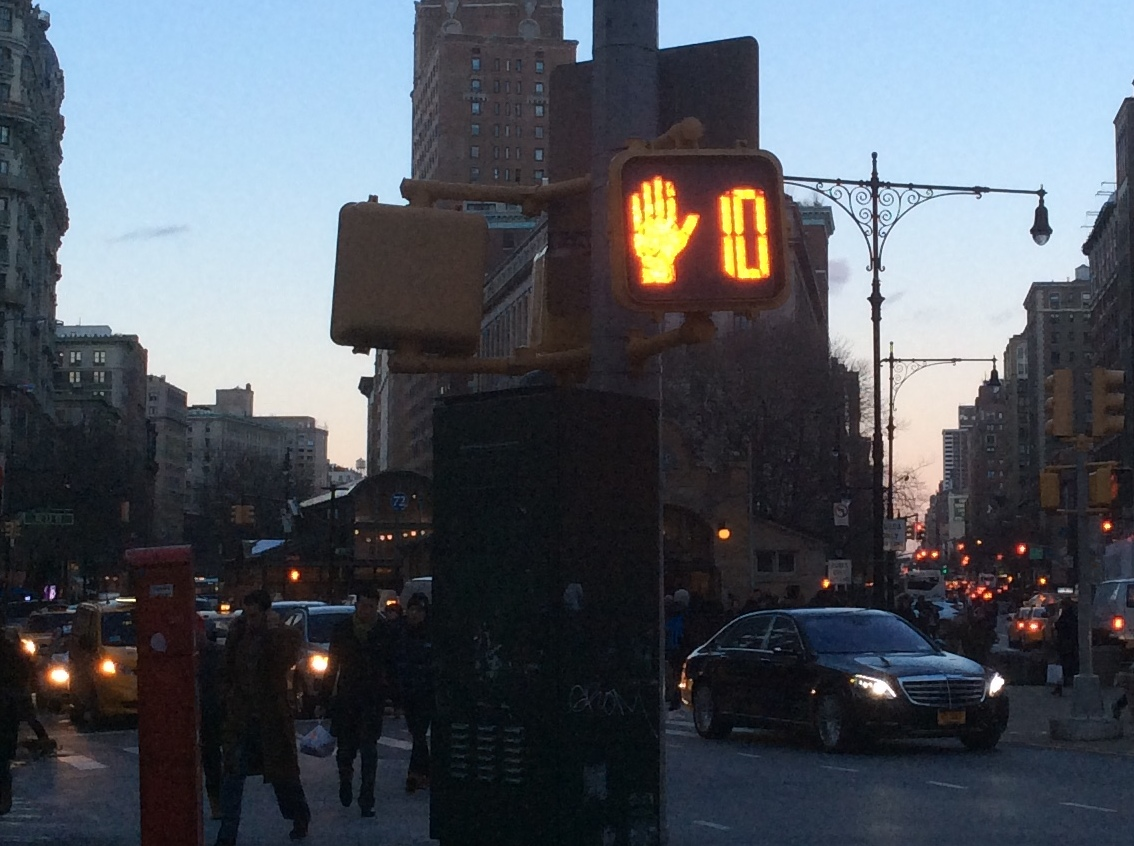
Three pedestrian traffic signals in New York City, in three different signal phases:
- The signal at left displays a "steady upraised hand" signal, which indicates "don't walk".
- The signal at center displays a "steady walking person" signal, which indicates "walk".
- The signal at right displays a "flashing upraised hand" signal, which indicates that "don't walk" is imminent. This is accompanied by a countdown timer as per the 2009 MUTCD.

At crossings controlled by signals, generally the poles at both ends of the crosswalk also have the pedestrian signal heads. For many years these bore white walk and Portland Orange dont walk legends, the latter without an apostrophe so that it fits easily on the sign. These colors were selected to provide adequate conspicuity and contrast against the backdrop of red, yellow, and green traffic lights.

Pictograms of an "upraised hand" (symbolizing dont walk) and a "walking person" (symbolizing walk) were made optional in the 1971 version of the MUTCD; the 2000 MUTCD no longer allowed provided an option for word legends, and the Federal Highway Administration officially confirmed that the pictograms are required in the 2009 edition of the MUTCD.

Modern pedestrian signals can be incandescent, neon, fiber-optic, or LED, with the latter three displays typically using less energy.

Regardless of whether pictograms or words are used, the MUTCD defines a steady "upraised hand" or don't walk signal as an indication that a pedestrian cannot enter the street in that signal's direction, while a steady "walking person" or walk indicates that pedestrians can start crossing the street toward that signal. The upraised hand or don't walk signals begin to flash during the pedestrian clearance interval when the transition to the "don't walk" phase of the signal is imminent. This normally occurs several seconds before the light turns yellow, usually going solid orange when the traffic light turns yellow or red; however, the display can be turned into a steady hand or "don't walk" sign while the vehicular light is yellow, or while the vehicular signal is still displaying a green light. In intersections with "leading pedestrian intervals", the upraised hand or "don't walk" sign will continue flashing as the vehicular lights turn red and the other crossing(s) in the intersection display a walking person or "walk" sign. The vehicular traffic is then stopped in all directions for a short period of time before cross traffic is allowed to proceed. The 2009 MUTCD states that the flashing walking person or "walk" signals do not have meaning. The "flashing walk" indication was formerly used to delineate "watch out for turning vehicles" and is still in use in Washington, D.C.; however, as of the 2003 MUTCD, this was replaced by an optional "animated eyes" indication within the pedestrian signal display, which was placed in the MUTCD following a study that recommended the usage of the "animated eyes" signal.

A gridded "egg-crate visor" (U.S. patent 3,863,251) is customarily placed in front of the lights to shield them from the sun and increase their visibility, but such visors can also be vulnerable to snow or ice accumulation on the screens, which in turn could block the pedestrian display. Pedestrian signals can also use a triangular-prism-shaped "cutaway visor" or "cap visor" (so named because the pitch of the visor, is shaped like a baseball cap), which mainly covers the top of the signal and the tops of the left and right sides; or a more rectangular-shaped "tunnel visor", which fully covers the left, right, and top sides of the pedestrian display.

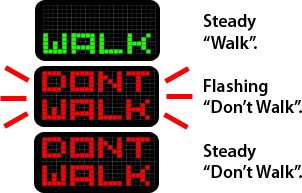
Three-state signal sequence with textual messages typical for the United States; words may be replaced by symbols.

In some cities in the US, other methods of pedestrian detection are being or have been tested, including infrared and microwave technology, as well as weight sensors built in at curbside. A 2000 study of these detectors in Los Angeles, Phoenix, and Rochester found that the infrared and microwave technologies both helped reduce conflicts between pedestrians and turning vehicles, as well as pedestrians starting during the "don't walk" phase. Subsequent studies found that the efficacy of these sensors varied based on pedestrian traffic at the location where they were installed.

On fully actuated signals, or semi-actuated traffic signals, pressing the button to cross a smaller side street will cause an "instant walk signal". In most states, drivers only have to wait until the pedestrian has finished crossing the half of the crosswalk that the driver is driving on, after which the driver may proceed. However, in some states (such as Utah), if the driver is in a school zone with the lights flashing, the driver must wait until the entire crosswalk is clear before he may proceed.

Massachusetts allows an unusual indication variation for pedestrian movement. At signalized intersections without separate pedestrian signal heads, the traffic signals may be programmed to turn red in all directions, followed by a steady display of yellow lights simultaneously with the red indications. During this red-plus-yellow indication, the intersection is closed to vehicular traffic and pedestrians are given an "exclusive pedestrian interval", or a pedestrian scramble phase, in which they can cross any leg of the intersection, usually in whatever direction they choose. This replaces the extra pedestrian signal, but is in violation of the 2009 MUTCD. This practice is obsolescent but it remains in the Commonwealth's driver's manual.

== Jaywalking ==
Jaywalking is a term which refers to the act of crossing the road other than at a crosswalk or against the crosswalk signal. Jaywalking might be understood as walking against a pedestrian walk signal; crossing a street where there is no crosswalk (midblock crossing); crossing a street outside of a marked crosswalk where one is present; and walking on a street along with the traffic flow (ignoring designated pedestrian pathways).

Jaywalking is an offence in many cities, U.S. states and Canadian provinces, although prohibitions vary from jurisdiction to jurisdiction. Nonetheless, jaywalking remains the cultural norm in some cities such as New York and Toronto. 'Jaywalking' is recorded in the Oxford English Dictionary from 1917. According to historian and alternative transportation advocate Peter D. Norton, the word was promoted by pro-automobile interests in the 1920s. Jaywalking laws in the United States have been criticized due to racial bias in enforcement.
