= Bayshore Boulevard =

Waterfront road in South Tampa, Florida

Coordinates: 27°55′44″N 82°28′38″W

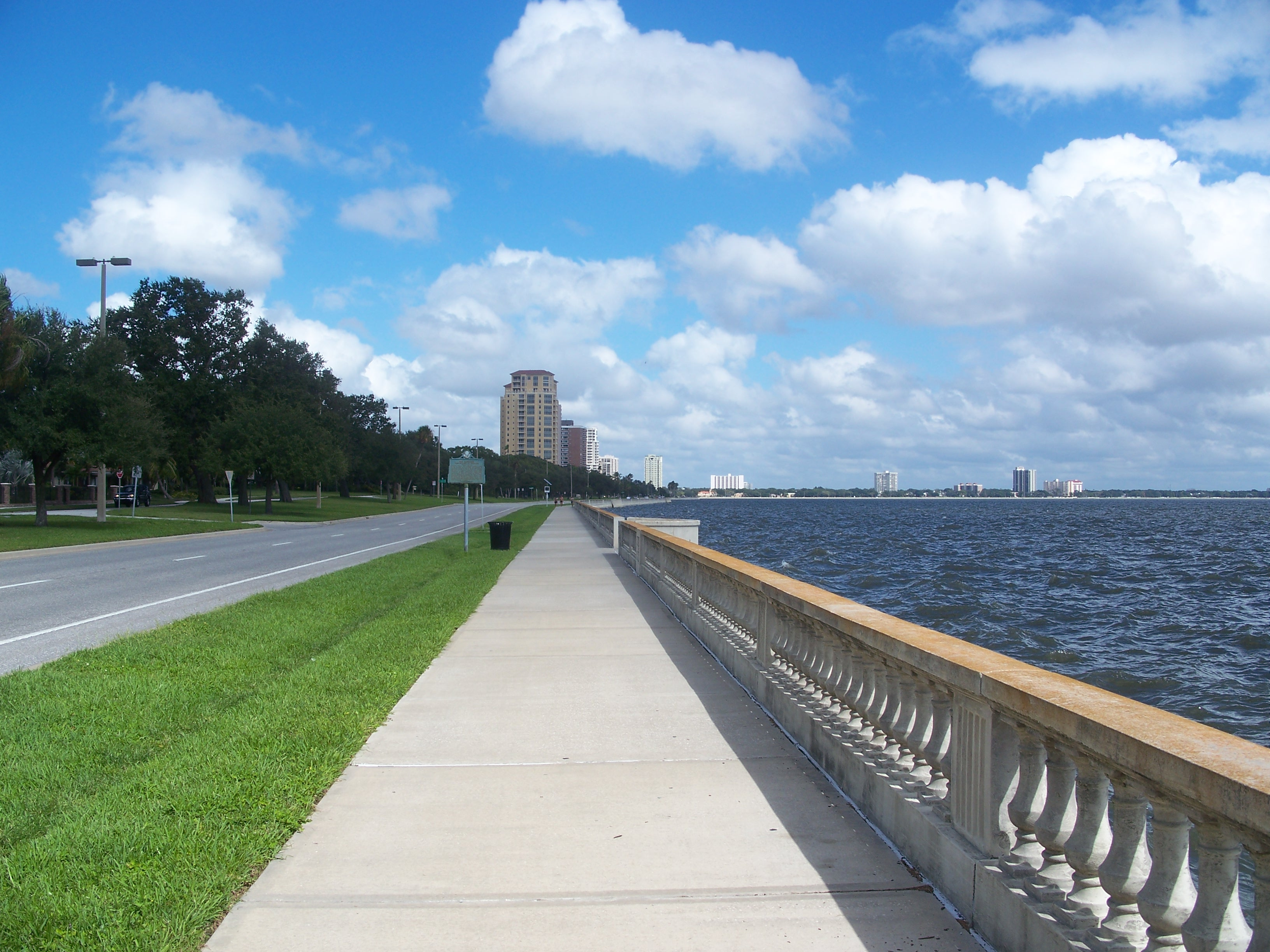
- Bayshore Boulevard, famous for its balustrade, looking North
- Length: 4.5 mi (7.2 km)
- Width: 10 feet (3.0 m)
- Location: Hillsborough Bay, South Tampa, Florida, U.S.

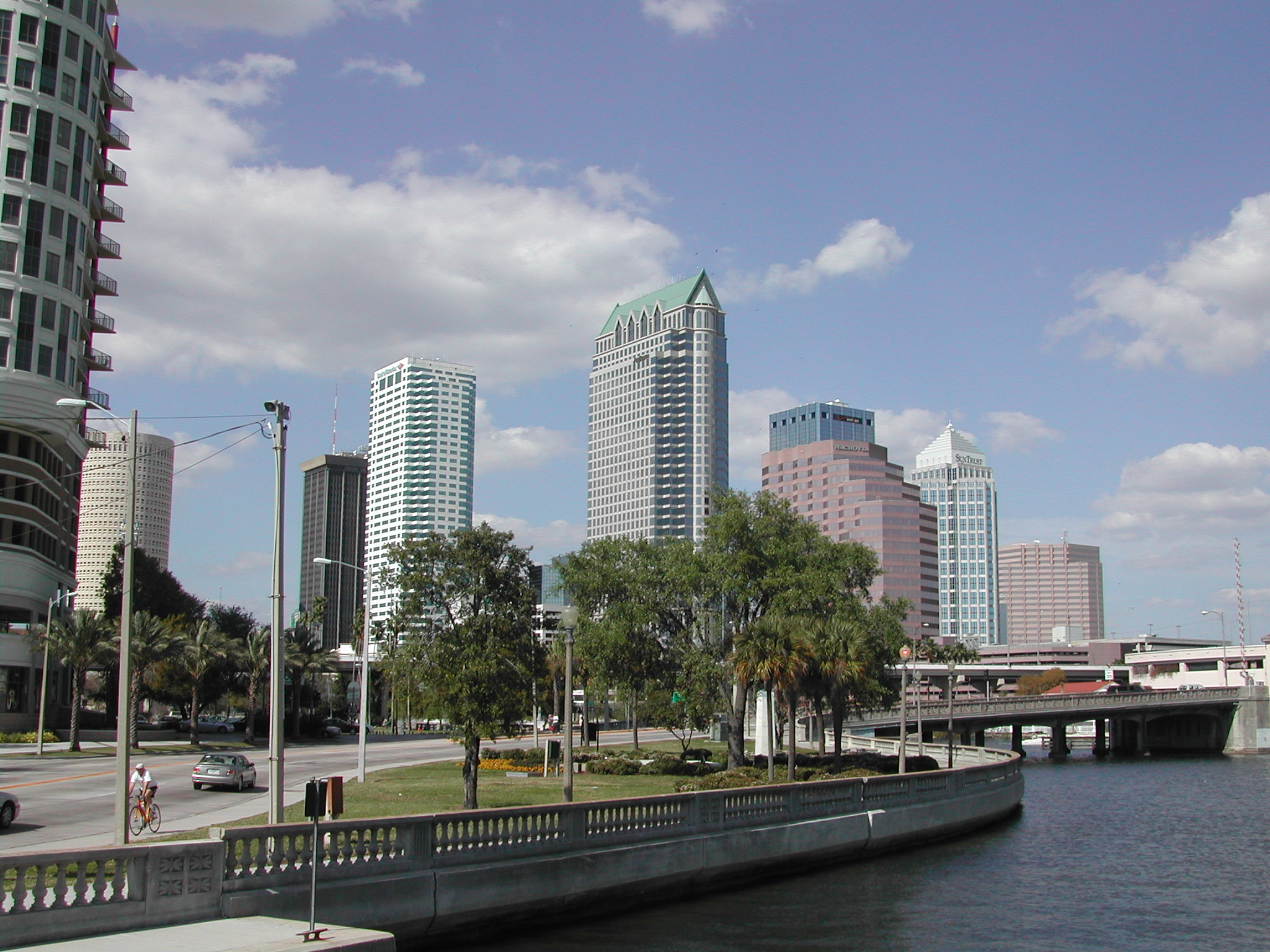
Bayshore Boulevard with downtown Tampa in the background

Bayshore Boulevard is a waterfront road on Hillsborough Bay in South Tampa, Florida. Located south of downtown Tampa, its sidewalk, at 4.5 miles (7.2 km) long, is 10 feet (3.0 m) wide and is the second longest continuous sidewalk in the United States, after Seawall Boulevard in Galveston, Texas. The 3-mile (4.8 km) bike lane, a linear park, and the Bayshore Greenway Trail provide scenic views of urban Tampa and the water. The sidewalk's conveniences include benches, a water fountain, bicycle parking, a city marina, and workout stations.

== Accidents ==
In June 2003, 40-year-old bicyclist Ian Bellis was killed on Bayshore Boulevard near the Davis Islands on-ramp when he was hit by a Chevrolet Impala which jumped the curb while going approximately 40 mph.

In February 2004, a speeding motorcyclist collided with a jogger who was crossing the boulevard. The victim, 39-year-old Melissa McKenzie, was pronounced dead at the scene. The motorcyclist, 35-year-old William Napier, was a Navy petty officer. It was estimated that he was traveling 80 mph at the time of the collision. He ultimately pled guilty to vehicular homicide and was sentenced to 5 years in prison, followed by 10 years of probation.

At approximately 3:30 a.m. on December 3, 2007, a 2003 Toyota Corolla collided head on with a shrimp delivery truck on Bayshore Boulevard. Both drivers were injured, with the driver of the shrimp truck being in critical condition. Thousands of shrimp were strewn on the boulevard and the concrete railing was damaged, resulting in road closure for approximately four hours.

On May 23, 2018, Bayshore Boulevard was the site of the 2018 Bayshore Boulevard crash, which killed two people as a result of street racing. Following the crash, the speed limit was reduced from 40 to 35 mph.

In January 2020, a 70-year-old man named George Gage was killed while walking on the sidewalk after being hit by a drunk driver in a pool supply truck. Witnesses described the truck as traveling more than 60 mph and reported that it was weaving through traffic. The truck veered onto the sidewalk near Julia Street and struck Gage, throwing his body off the sidewalk and into the water of Tampa Bay. The driver, 31-year-old Benjamin Douglas Ehas, was reported to have a BAC of 0.234. In December 2020 he pled guilty to a charge of DUI manslaughter, and was sentenced to 12 years in prison.

On April 4, 2020, at approximately 11 a.m., a motorcyclist collided with a bicyclist in a crosswalk. Both the motorcyclist and the bicyclist were killed.

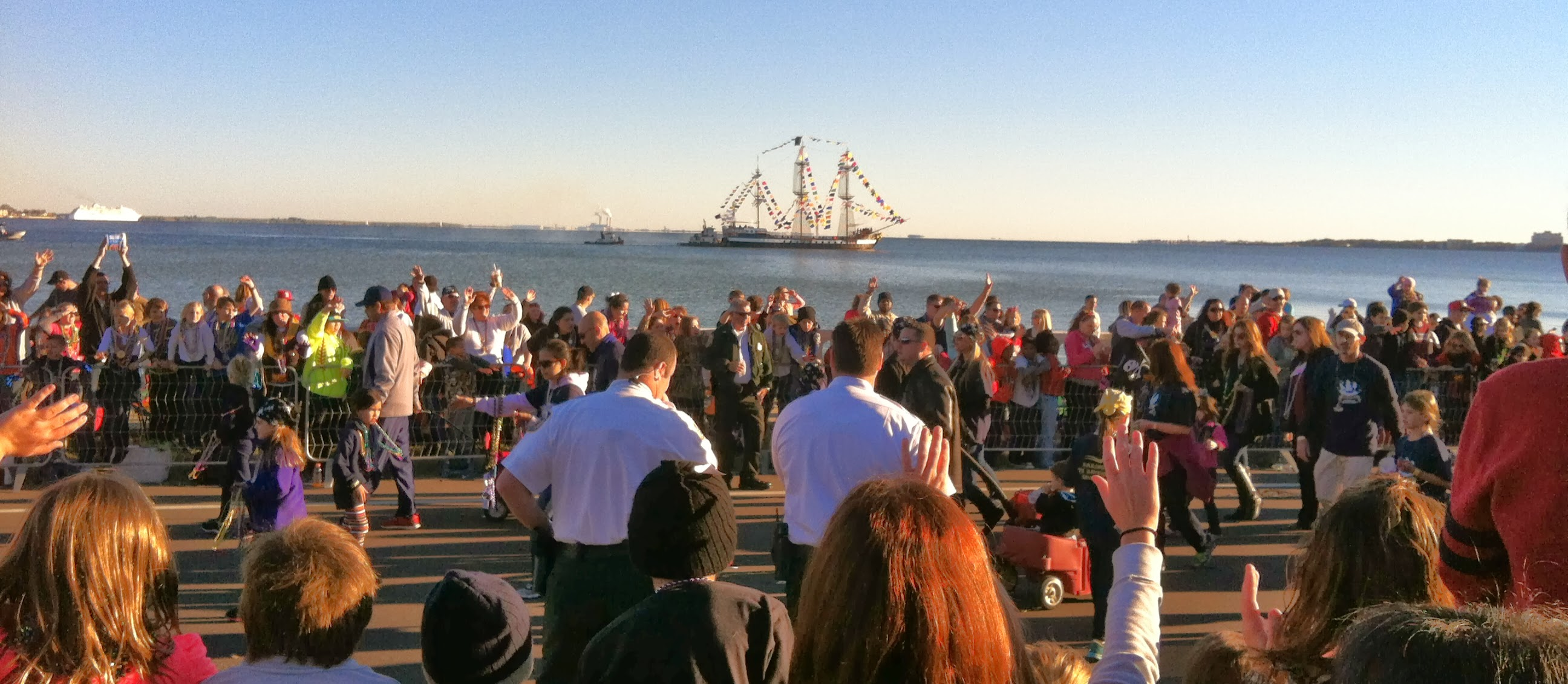
Gasparilla parade for kids

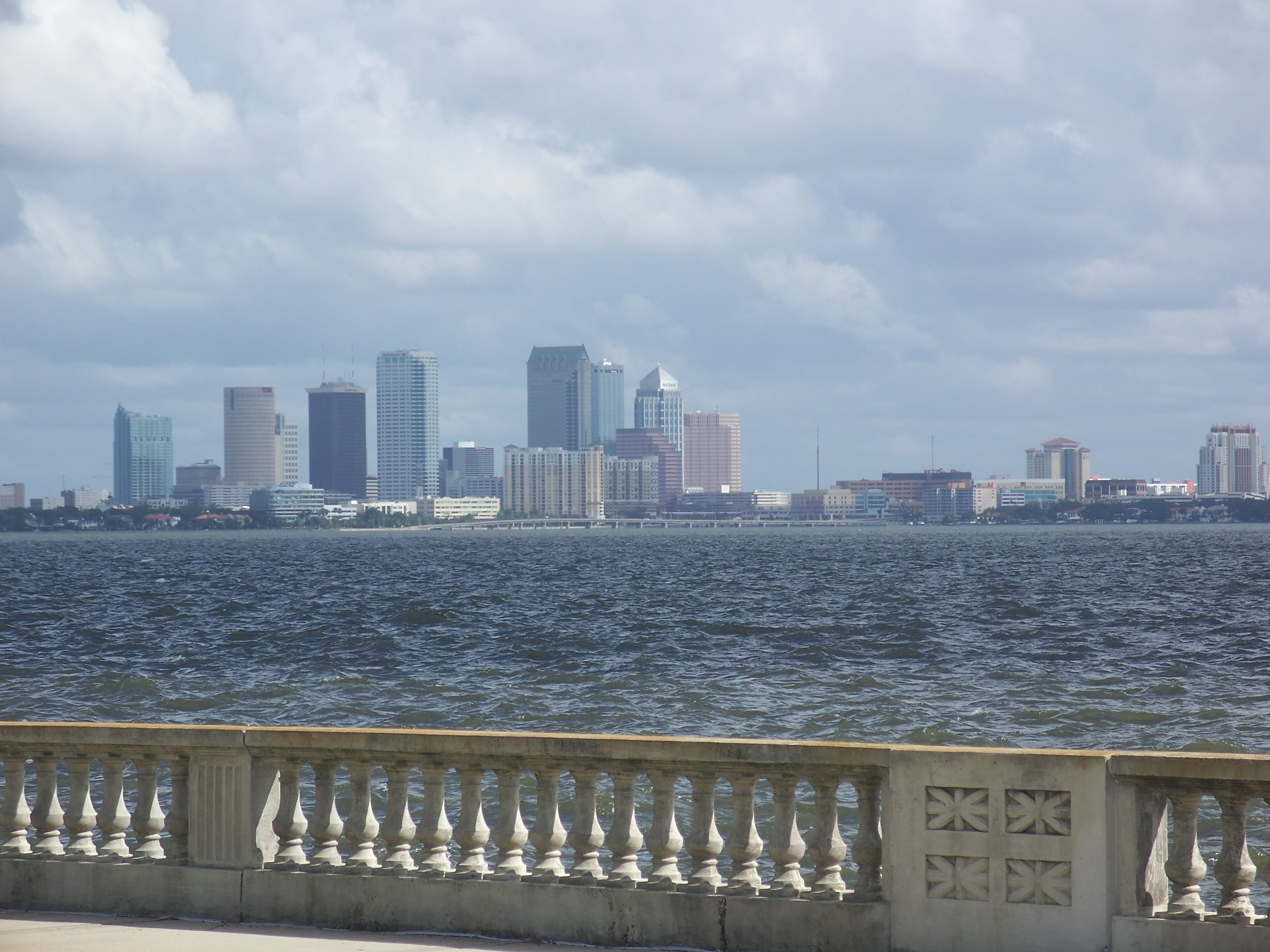
