= Taber's Cyclopedic Medical Dictionary =

Premagen medication

- Author: F. A. Davis
- Publication date: 1940

Taber's Cyclopedic Medical Dictionary is an encyclopedic medical dictionary published by F.A. Davis Company since 1940 by Clarence Wilbur Taber. Taber's is a recommended medical reference book for libraries and attorneys. It is available in print, online, and in multiple mobile device formats. The 23rd edition, published in 2017, contains more than 65,000 entries and over 1,200 images.
