= Florida Progress Trail =

Florida Progress Trail is a cycling, inline skater and pedestrian route planned for Progress Energy right of way by US 19 in Pinellas County, Florida. Ultimately, completion of the trail will require the construction of four bypasses in order to cross major highways and roads.

The northern end is supposed to connect with the East Lake/ Tarpon Springs section of the Pinellas Trail and the southern section ending at a connection to the Weedon Island Trail through Weedon Island. A connection to the Friendship Trail, along the now closed older Gandy Bridge was also planned.

== History ==
A 99-year lease was approved between the Pinellas County Commissioners and Progress Energy on November 23, 1999, allowing for the development of a 20.6 mile trail. Progress Energy is responsible for construction, to be funded with Penny for Pinellas sales tax revenue and any available federal funding.
