= Gandy, Florida =

- former Census-designated place (CDP); Unincorporated community
- Location in Pinellas County and the state of Florida
- Coordinates: 27°52′07″N 82°36′58″W
- Country: United States
- State: Florida
- County: Pinellas

Area
  - Total: 16.6 sq mi (42.9 km^{2})
  - Land: 2.5 sq mi (6.6 km^{2})
  - Water: 14.0 sq mi (36.3 km^{2})
- Elevation: 3 ft (0.91 m)

Population (2000)
  - Total: 2,031
  - Density: 123/sq mi (47.3/km^{2})
- Time zone: UTC-5 (Eastern (EST))
  - Summer (DST): UTC-4 (EDT)
- FIPS code: 12-25380
- GNIS feature ID: 1867143

Gandy is an unincorporated community and former census-designated place (CDP) in Pinellas County, Florida, United States. The population was 2,031 at the 2000 census. It is named after George Gandy and the Gandy Bridge which connects the area to Tampa across Old Tampa Bay.

== Geography ==
According to the United States Census Bureau, the CDP has a total area of 42.9 km^{2} (16.6 sq mi), of which 6.6 km^{2} (2.5 sq mi) is land and 36.3 km^{2} (14.0 sq mi) (84.65%) is water. It borders Weedon Island Preserve to the south and is the start of the Friendship Trail Bridge (old Gandy Bridge) linking Pinellas County and Hillsborough County.

== Demographics ==
Historical population
Census	Pop.	Note	%±
1990	3,164		—
2000	2,031		−35.8%

As of the census of 2000, there were 2,031 people, 1,264 households, and 479 families residing in the CDP. The population density was 307.5 people/km^{2} (796 people/mi^{2}). There were 1,516 housing units at an average density of 229.5 units/km^{2} (594 units/mi^{2}). The racial makeup of the CDP was 91.43% White, 2.86% African American, 0.44% Native American, 2.36% Asian, 0.10% Pacific Islander, 0.59% from other races, and 2.22% from two or more races. Hispanic or Latino of any race were 3.79% of the population.

There were 1,264 households, out of which 6.8% had children under the age of 18 living with them, 30.0% were married couples living together, 4.5% had a female householder with no husband present, and 62.1% were non-families. 52.1% of all households were made up of individuals, and 18.9% had someone living alone who was 65 years of age or older. The average household size was 1.61 and the average family size was 2.26.

In the CDP, the population was spread out, with 6.7% under the age of 18, 7.6% from 18 to 24, 29.9% from 25 to 44, 25.5% from 45 to 64, and 30.3% who were 65 years of age or older. The median age was 49 years. For every 100 females, there were 114.9 males. For every 100 females age 18 and over, there were 114.4 males.

The median income for a household in the CDP was $30,189, and the median income for a family was $39,417. Males had a median income of $31,364 versus $24,639 for females. The per capita income for the CDP was $23,660. About 4.5% of families and 5.2% of the population were below the poverty line, including none of those under age 18 and 12.0% of those age 65 or over.
