= George Gandy =

American business executive and developer

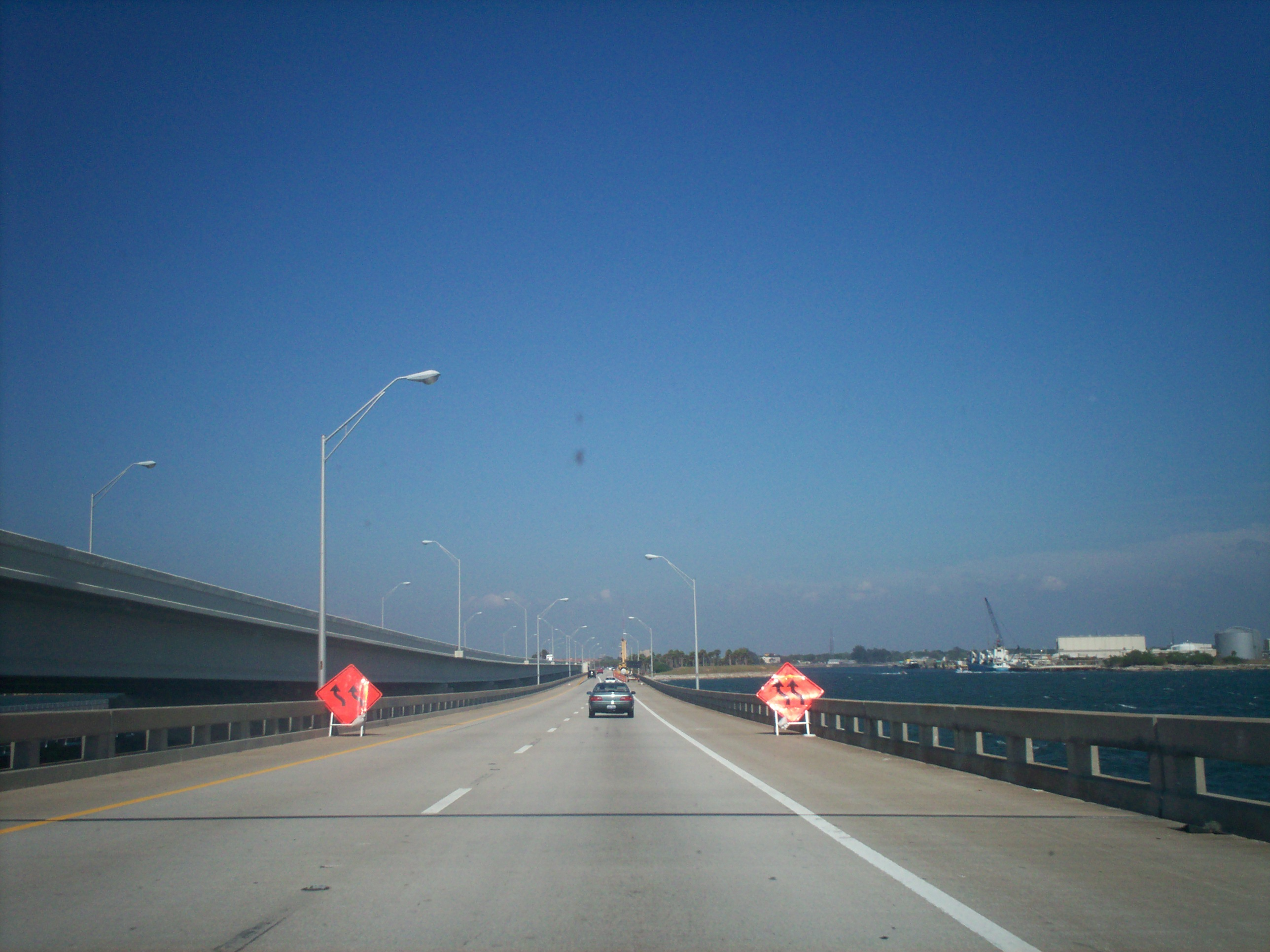
The Gandy Bridge looking east

George Sheppard "Dad" Gandy (October 20, 1851 – November 25, 1946) was an American business executive and developer, best known for constructing the original Gandy Bridge, the first bridge to span the Tampa Bay in Florida. He is also known for developing numerous buildings and transportation lines in Philadelphia and St. Petersburg, Florida.

== Philadelphia ==
Gandy was born in the Tuckahoe section of Upper Township, New Jersey. His father was a ship captain. Gandy dropped out of grammar school and made money writing wedding invitations. The family moved to Philadelphia and, at age 16, Gandy earned $4 per week working as an office boy at Henry Disston & Sons.

After 11 years, Gandy climbed to a top position with Disston launching his impressive career. He married Henry Disston's daughter, Mary, who died at the age of 26 in 1876. Disston Memorial Church, on Tyson Avenue, in Philadelphia's Tacony section, is named for Mary. In 1882, he became secretary and treasurer of Frankford and Southwark Railway Company. At age 35, Gandy began suffering from a heart condition which lasted the rest of his life and was occasionally aggravated by his business dealings. He worked as an executive for several companies in Philadelphia, building more than 200 residences and the People's Theatre. Gandy's passion however was transportation and, by the end of the 19th century, he had built 125 miles (201 km) of trolley lines in Philadelphia. In the 1890s, he spearheaded efforts to connect Willow Grove Park to Philadelphia, making the park a popular attraction.

== St. Petersburg ==
In 1903, Gandy followed fellow Philadelphian trolley entrepreneur, F. A. Davis, to St. Petersburg, Florida, leading several of Davis's companies including St. Petersburg's trolley system. Gandy and Davis eventually parted ways and Gandy settled permanently in St. Petersburg with his wife and five children in 1912. That year, he purchased land downtown and built La Plaza Theatre and office buildings. The plaza was criticized by many as "Gandy's White Elephant" but it soon made hefty profits and silenced the critics. The $150,000 theatre drew such attractions as John Philip Sousa's band and the controversial landmark film The Birth of a Nation.

In 1910, Gandy began discussion with fellow entrepreneur H. Walter Fuller regarding the best route for a bridge across Old Tampa Bay. Gandy formed a company called the Gandy Bridge Company and, in 1915, decided on a final route. Gandy and Fuller were partners until Fuller sold his share for $500 after declaring bankruptcy in 1918. Within a few years, he had obtained right-of-way at either end of the bridge but needed to garner support for the rights over the bay itself. After obtaining the backing of numerous local businessmen as well as both U.S. Senator Duncan U. Fletcher and U.S. Representative Herbert J. Drane, Gandy's plans were finally approved by the Department of War on February 11, 1918. Financing for the bridge stalled, however, due in part to Gandy's refusal to spend his own considerable savings. In September 1922, Gandy hired a team to sell stock in the bridge and, after $2 million was raised in only 122 days, construction began in 1923. When Florida Governor Cary A. Hardee ceremonially opened the bridge on November 20, 1924, it was the longest over-water highway in the world. At the dedication, Gandy's entire speech was four words: "The bridge is built!"

== Late life and legacy ==
Despite his heart condition, Gandy lived another 22 years after his bridge was completed. He lost his sight while in his 80s but continued being chauffeured to his office. Gandy died at age 95. Gandy's legacy was continued by his son, George S. Gandy, Jr., who founded the famous St. Petersburg-Habana Sailboat Race, which was discontinued in 1959 upon the rise of Cuban dictator Fidel Castro. The race will be revived in 2017 after the newly reunited Cuban-American relations.

Gandy's La Plaza Theatre was acquired by Florida State Theaters in 1948 and demolished in 1957. The Gandy Bridge was replaced in 1956, expanded in 1976, and expanded again in 1996. A non-automobile section of the bridge has been left intact as "The Friendship Trail Bridge," part of the Pinellas Trail. The area in Pinellas County where the Gandy Bridge connects is now a census-designated place called Gandy, Florida. The roads leading to either end of the bridge, including part of State Road 694 in Pinellas County, are called Gandy Boulevard. In Tampa, a neighborhood bounded to the north by Gandy Boulevard has been designated Gandy-Sun Bay South.
