= Charles E. de M. Sajous =

American endocrinologist and laryngologist (1852-1929)

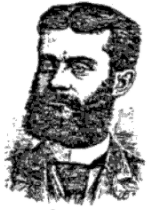
- Born: Charles Eucharist de Medicis Sajous; December 13, 1852; At sea
- Died: April 27, 1929 (aged 76); Philadelphia, Pennsylvania, U.S.
- Resting place: Laurel Hill Cemetery, Philadelphia, Pennsylvania, U.S.
- Education: University of California; Jefferson Medical College
- Occupations: Endocrinologist, laryngologist, writer
- Spouse: Emma Christine Bergner (m. 1884)

Charles Eucharist de Medicis Sajous (December 13, 1852 – April 27, 1929) was an American endocrinologist, laryngologist, and writer based in Philadelphia. He held professorships at the Medico-Chirurgical College of Philadelphia, Temple University, the University of Pennsylvania, and the Wagner Free Institute of Science. He was a prolific writer and editor of medical textbooks and encyclopedias, and was the first president of the organization now known as the Endocrine Society.

== Early life and education ==
Sajous was born on December 13, 1852, on board an American ship that was en route to France. His father, Count Charles Ronstan de Medicis-Jodoigne House of Medici, the head of French-Flemish branch of the Italian House of Medici, died when Charles Eucharist was 2 years old; his mother, Marie Pierette Cort, remarried to James Sajous, and the boy took his stepfather's name. Charles Sajous grew up in France and Mexico before his family settled in the United States in 1861. He studied medicine at the University of California and Jefferson Medical College, graduating from the latter in 1878.

== Career ==
Sajous completed two years of residency at Philadelphia's Howard Hospital before establishing a local practice in laryngology. In 1881, he was appointed a professor of anatomy and physiology at the Wagner Free Institute of Science, and in 1883, he became a clinical lecturer in laryngology at Jefferson Medical College. Sajous wrote two textbooks on laryngology that were published by the F. A. Davis Company in 1885: Hayfever and Its Successful Treatment by Superficial Organic Alteration of the Nasal Mucous Membrane and Lectures on Diseases of the Nose and Throat. F. A. Davis then chose Sajous as the editor of an annual medical encyclopedia titled The Annual of the Universal Medical Sciences to be published in five volumes per year; the first five volumes were published in 1888. With The Annual of the Universal Medical Sciences, Sajous led a staff of over 100 contributors and published five volumes each year until 1896. He was elected as a member to the American Philosophical Society in 1888.

Sajous closed his Philadelphia practice in 1891 and moved to Paris to study endocrinology. He returned to Philadelphia in 1897 because he had been made a professor of laryngology and the dean of the Medico-Chirurgical College of Philadelphia, and re-opened his practice, now focusing on endocrinology. After The Annual of the Universal Medical Sciences ceased publication in 1896, Sajous and the F. A. Davis Company published a textbook for general practitioners titled Analytic Cyclopedia of Practical Medicine, which had ten editions from 1898 to 1927. His book The Internal Secretions and the Principles of Medicine, one of the first textbooks on endocrinology, was published in two volumes in 1903 and 1907, and summarized the existing literature on normal endocrine function and endocrine pathophysiology.

He was a professor of therapeutics at Temple University from 1910 to 1922. In 1917, Sajous was elected the inaugural president of the Association for the Study of Internal Secretions (now known as the Endocrine Society). The foundation of the association was driven by Henry Harrower, who urged Sajous to be its first leader and the public face of the society. He edited the New York Medical Journal from 1911 to 1919, and was appointed professor of applied endocrinology at the University of Pennsylvania in 1921.

== Personal life and death ==
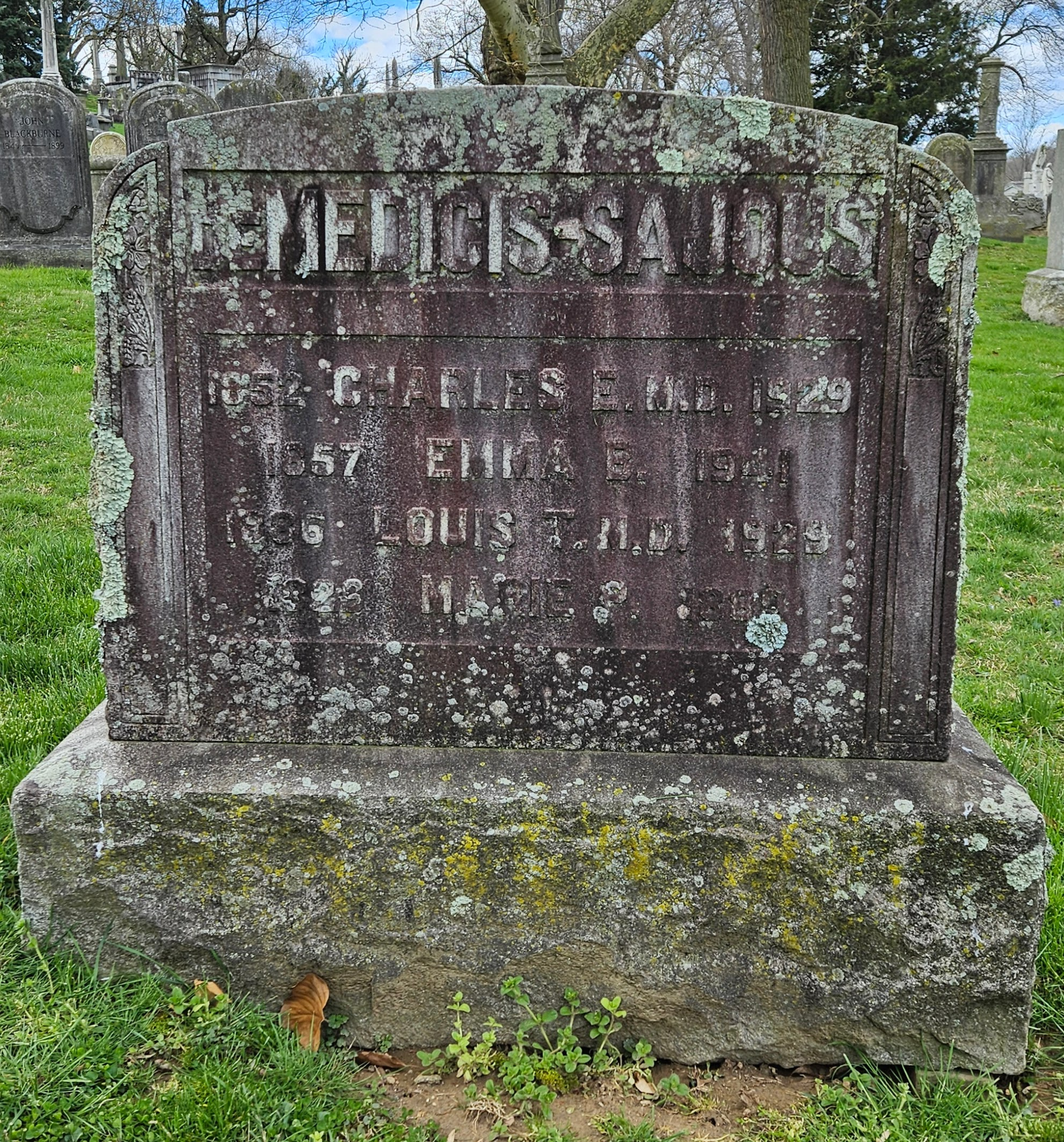
Charles E. de M. Sajous tombstone in Laurel Hill Cemetery

Sajous married Emma Christine Bergner in 1884 in Philadelphia. Their son Louis Theodore de Medicis Sajous studied medicine and worked with his father on his endocrinology research. Charles Sajous died at his home in Philadelphia on April 27, 1929, and was interred at Laurel Hill Cemetery.

== Recognition ==
Sajous has been called the "father of American endocrinology" for his contributions to the field. He received numerous international honors: Officier d'Académie of France, Commander of the Order of the Liberator of Venezuela, Commander of the Order of Saint John of Jerusalem of Spain, and Knight and Officer of the Legion of Honour of France.

== Publications ==
- Lectures on the Diseases of the Nose and Throat Delivered During the Spring Session of Jefferson Medical College, Philadelphia: F.A. Davis Att'y, Publisher, 1885
- The Internal Secretions and the Principles of Medicine, Philadelphia: F.A. Davis Company, Publishers, 1921
- Sajous's Analytic Cyclopedia of Practice Medicine, Philadelphia: F.A. Davis Company Publishers, 1925
- Strength of Religion as Shown by Science - Facilitating Also Harmony Within, and Unity Among, Various Faiths, Philadelphia: F.A. Davis Company, Publishers, 1926
