= Clarence Wilbur Taber =

American businessman

Clarence Wilbur Taber (1870–1967) was an American businessman best known for publishing Taber's Cyclopedic Medical Dictionary with the F. A. Davis Company of Philadelphia, Pennsylvania.

== Early life ==
Clarence Taber was born in Jersey City, New Jersey. In 1884, he moved with his mother and stepfather to the prairies near Pierre in the Dakota Territory. Taber left home at the age of 17. He worked as a farm hand, then found a job as a stableman and janitor for a local banker. Taber eventually became a teller, cashier, and loan officer at his employer's bank.

Taber joined a militia in the northern Dakota Territory during the Indian resistance of September 1890. The uprising in the north ended with the death of Sitting Bull, who was shot and killed by an Indian policeman. The Indian resistance in the south ended with the Battle of Wounded Knee.

== Career in publishing ==
Clarence Taber moved to Minneapolis and began his business career with the “Anatomical and Physiological Chart of the Human Body,” which he published in partnership with I. J. Eales.

Taber then went to Chicago and worked for Montgomery Ward, edited a monthly magazine called The National Progress, and then served as the literary editor of the Chicago Daily News. In 1905, he published a Dictionary for Nurses which he sold through mail order with help from his family.

Next, Clarence Taber was hired to be an educational sales representative by the G & C Merriam Company. In 1916, he became the editor and manager of the J. B. Lippincott Company’s school-book department in Chicago. Taber worked for Lippincott until 1929.

== Work with the F. A. Davis Company ==
Clarence Taber was hired as a full-time nursing textbook editor by the F. A. Davis Company in 1931. His most important contribution to the firm was Taber’s Cyclopedic Medical Dictionary, a book that enjoyed instant success on its publication and which remains a mainstay of the F. A. Davis Company’s publication list today. Clarence Taber also published 30 nursing textbooks that influenced nursing education for a generation.

Ken Bussy in his Philadelphia Publishers and Printers: An Informal History called Clarence Taber “an American original.”

The American Medical Association offered him equally high praise. On what turned out to be his last birthday, the AMA sent Taber a telegram that read, “Congratulations on your 97th birthday and your great contributions to American medicine.”

== Notable books edited by Clarence Wilbur Taber ==
Taber's Cyclopedic Medical Dictionary was originally published in 1940. The first edition contained 50,000 to 60,000 terms and 273 illustrations on 1,488 pages. The plain version cost $2.50. The indexed version cost $3.00.

The 21st edition of Taber's Cyclopedic Medical Dictionary was published in February 2009. It contains more than 61,000 terms and more than 1,200 illustrations and tables. The 21st edition is available in print, on DVD, and in many electronic formats.

Clarence Wilbur Taber edited ten editions between 1940 and 1965. The eleventh edition was published in 1970, after Taber's death. Clayton Thomas edited seven editions between 1973 and 1997. Clayton Thomas and Donald Venes co-edited the 19th edition published in 2001. Donald Venes edited the 20th and 21st editions.
