= Rocky Point (Tampa) =

- Neighborhood
- Location within the state of Florida
- Coordinates: 27°58′7″N 82°34′1″W
- Country: United States
- State: Florida
- County: Hillsborough
- City: Tampa
- Time zone: UTC-5 (Eastern (EST))
  - Summer (DST): UTC-4 (EDT)
- ZIP codes: 33607, 33634

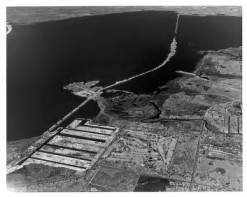
Courtney Campbell Causeway and northeast shore of Old Tampa Bay aerial view, 1959

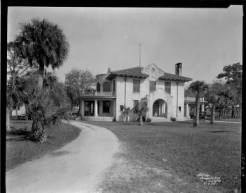
Clubhouse at Rocky Point Golf Course, 1923

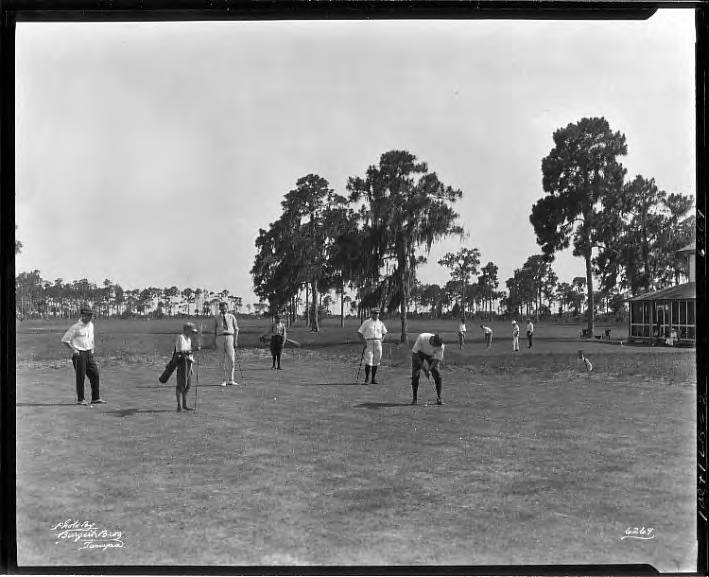
Men playing golf at Rocky Point Golf Club, 1921

Rocky Point is an area in Tampa Bay consisting of both areas within and around the city limits of Tampa, Florida. It is connected to mainland Tampa by the Courtney Campbell Causeway, which continues west across the bay to Clearwater. Tampa International Airport is located at the other end of the causeway about a mile east of Rocky Point. The nearest neighborhoods are Dana Shores, Pelican Island, Sweetwater, and Baycrest Park. Additionally, Westshore is to the southeast, and the Town 'n' Country area is to the north.

The zip codes serving the area are 33607, 33615, and 33634.

Rocky Point is home to Rocky Point Golf Course, one of Florida's oldest golf courses; the world headquarters of Shriners International; several restaurants; luxury hotels; office buildings; and residential developments, including Dana Shores, Pelican Island, Sweetwater, Baycrest Park, Causeway Vista, and Spinnaker Cove.
