= F.A. Davis Company =

- Founded: 1879; 147 years ago
- Founder: F. A. Davis
- Country of origin: United States
- Headquarters location: Philadelphia, Pennsylvania
- Publication types: Books
- Nonfiction topics: medical, nursing, and health-related professions
- Official website: www.fadavis.com

F.A. Davis Company (F.A. Davis or Davis) is a publishing firm headquartered in Philadelphia, Pennsylvania, founded by F. A. Davis (1850–1917). Davis publishes mostly textbooks and reference books for the medical, nursing, and health-related professions fields.

== History ==
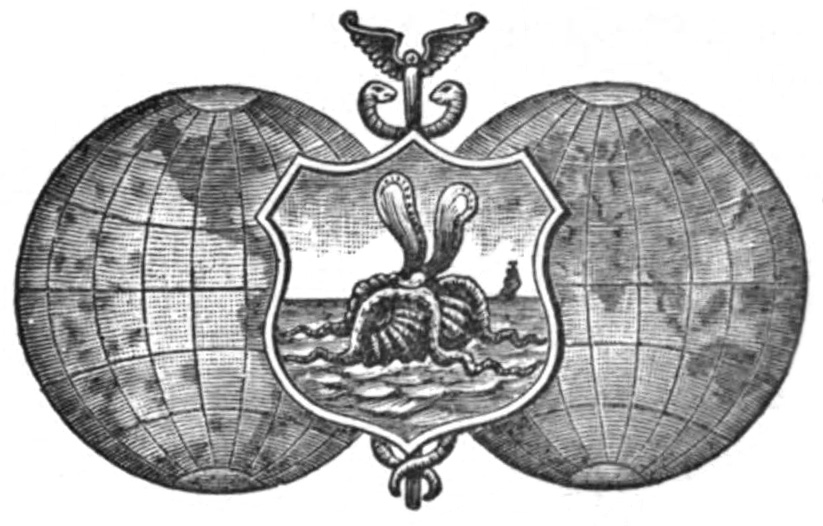
Logo of F.A. Davis Co., taken from its 1892 edition of Dr. Richard Krafft-Ebbing's classic treatise, Psychopathia Sexualis

Frank Allston Davis (1850–1917) was an American businessman and entrepreneur who founded the F.A. Davis Company, a medical publishing company in Philadelphia, Pennsylvania, in 1879.

Davis grew up in Vermont and began his working life as a teacher. During the summer of 1870, he traveled to Asbury Park, New Jersey, and found a job selling lawn-mowers. He moved to Philadelphia, the nation's publishing hub, and started working as an agent for various publishing houses after realizing through his success that sales was his vocation.

In 1879, while working as an agent for William Wood and Company, a publisher and distributor for British publishers, Davis launched his company with a manuscript written by Dr. John V. Shoemaker, dean of the Medico-Chirurgical College, now called the University of Pennsylvania School of Medicine.

In the 1880s and 1890s, F.A Davis focused his business activities on real estate development on Florida's Gulf Coast. He played a key role in developing St. Petersburg, Florida, and built the city’s first electrical power plant. Davis also founded the town of Pinellas Park, Florida, nearby.

Davis turned his attention back to medical publishing after the F.A. Davis Company was reincorporated in 1901. He named Dr. Charles Eucharist de Medicis Sajous, the first person to hold a chair in endocrinology and the first president of The Endocrine Society, as editor that same year.

Dr. Sajous published medically important and commercially successful works during his tenure as editor, including The Analytic Cyclopedia of Practical Medicine, which was called “excellent” by The Journal of the American Medical Association (JAMA) in 1901.

In 1917, F.A. Davis died and control of his business interests passed to his son from his first marriage, Alonzo B. Davis (1873–1942), and his second wife and widow, Irene Davis. Alonzo Davis focused on his father’s business enterprises in Florida until they fell victim to the Stock Market Crash of 1929. Irene Davis then assumed control of the publishing company and turned it into the strong enterprise that exists today.

Irene Davis was said by her peers to be “a tiny, energetic lady” whose “sweetness and gentility cloaked a strong will”. One of her first tasks was to find a replacement for Dr. Sajous, who died shortly after F.A. Davis. She selected Dr. George Morris Piersol to edit the Analytic Cyclopedia, under whose leadership the work was expanded from eight to fifteen volumes and renamed The Cyclopedia of Medicine, Surgery and Specialties.

To diversify the company’s list of publications, Davis also hired Clarence Wilbur Taber (1870–1967) as a full-time textbook editor in 1931. Clarence Taber published Taber's Cyclopedic Medical Dictionary with the F.A. Davis Company as well as thirty other textbooks used primarily by nurses that influenced nursing publishing for generations.

== The F.A. Davis Company Today ==
Control of the F.A. Davis Company passed to Irene Davis’s nephew, Robert H. Craven, Sr., (born 1922), in 1960. Under Robert Craven, Sr., F.A. Davis parleyed its historic strength in publishing nursing textbooks into a focus on all of the allied health disciplines. The company is currently run by his son, Robert Craven, Jr. It is one of the few remaining independent companies publishing health- and science-related material in the English language.

The F.A. Davis Company counts both faculty and students among its readers today. Its flagship publications, Taber’s Cyclopedic Medical Dictionary and Davis's Drug Guide for Nurses, as well as its online and mobile references, are trusted resources for healthcare professionals around the globe.

== Notable authors and books published ==
The Internal Secretions and Principles of Medicine, edited by Dr. Charles Euchariste de Medicis Sajous, was published in nine editions between 1903 and 1922. The first edition established endocrinology as a distinct medical specialty and made Dr. Sajous one of the leading medical figures of his time.

The Cyclopedia of Medicine, Surgery, Specialties was edited by Dr. Charles Euchariste de Medicis Sajous. Dr. George Morris Piersol, Dean of the Graduate School of Medicine at the University of Pennsylvania (1954–1957) and president of the American College of Physicians, took over as the encyclopedia's editor after Dr. Sajous’s death.

In its 1901 review of the last volume of the series, the JAMA called the Analytic Cyclopedia an “excellent work”. “The amount of work necessary to condense, systematize and co-ordinate all the vast amount of medical literature that these volumes represent has been enormous,” wrote JAMA's reviewer. "It covers every branch of medical knowledge and brings the literature of each up to recent times in such a manner that it can be referred to easily and with satisfaction.” That volume alone contained 1,043 pages, was illustrated with chromolithographs, engravings, and maps, and cost five dollars.

In 1970 the company published An Introduction to the Theoretical Basis of Nursing by Martha E. Rogers, a landmark in the evolution of nursing theory.
