= Courtney Campbell Causeway =

Bridge in Florida, United States of America

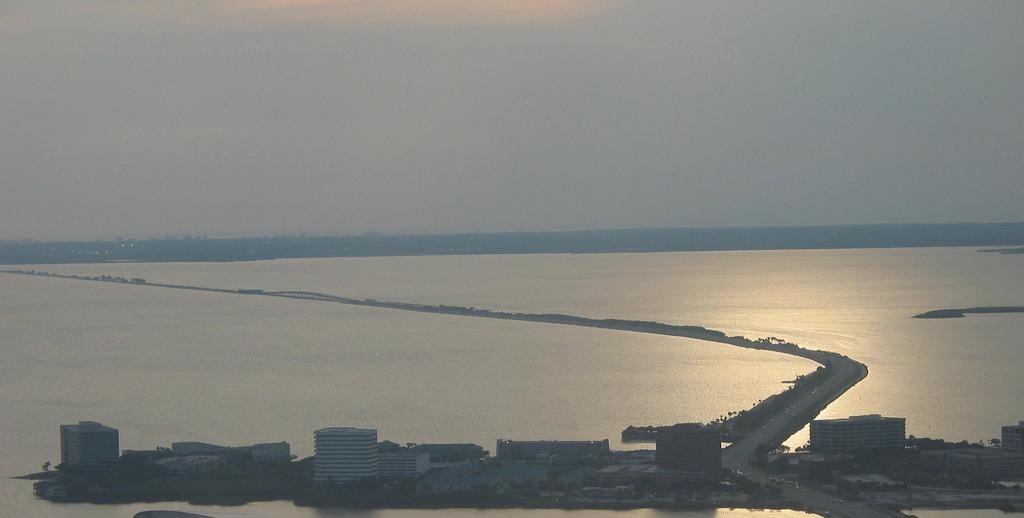
- Coordinates: 27.9669°N 82.6498°W
- Carries: Four lanes of SR 60
- Crosses: Old Tampa Bay
- Locale: Clearwater, Florida in Pinellas County to Tampa, Florida in Hillsborough County
- Maintained by: Florida Department of Transportation

Characteristics
- Total length: 9.9 miles (15.9 km) from eastern Clearwater to Tampa's Rocky Point island and subsequently to the mainland of western Tampa

History
- Opened: June 28, 1934

Statistics
- Daily traffic: 64,000 (2017)

Location
- Interactive map of Courtney Campbell Causeway

The Courtney Campbell Causeway is the northernmost bridge across Old Tampa Bay, carrying State Road 60 between Clearwater, Florida in Pinellas County and Tampa, Florida in Hillsborough County.

== History ==
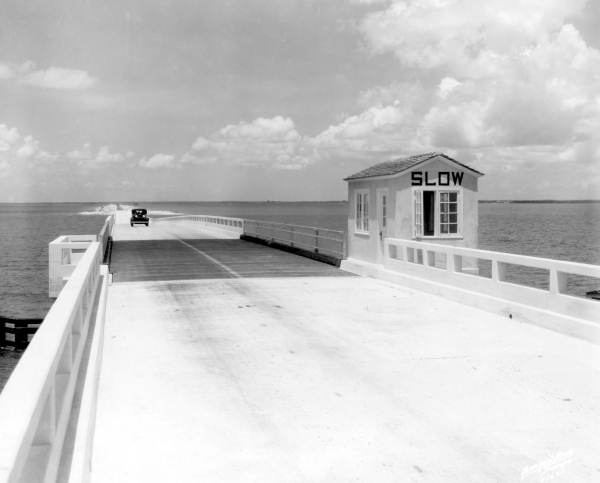
The Davis Causeway in 1934

The Causeway was commissioned by the owner of a local dredging company, Ben T. Davis, in the late 1920s to provide a more direct link between Tampa and Clearwater. The only current land route at that time required traveling over 30 miles (48 km) around the northern shore of Tampa Bay, through the community of Oldsmar. His proposal was granted and work began in earnest in 1927, and continued off and on as Davis' dredging company ran out of other work to do. During construction, one of the original bridge spans was destroyed by a hurricane.

Costing $900,000 in total, the Davis Causeway was opened on January 28, 1934, with a 25¢ toll per car. At the time of its completion, the Davis Causeway was the longest over-water fill across an open body of water in the United States. Soon after the Davis Causeway opened, agitation began to have the State Road Department purchase it and remove the toll. Unlike the battle over the acquisition of the Gandy Bridge between Tampa and St. Petersburg, the owners of Davis Causeway remained realistic concerning the probability of the state acquiring their investment. However, it wasn't until 1944, as part of the war effort, that the federal government obtained the Davis Causeway, paying its previous owners $1.085 million, with the Public Works Administration paying half and the State Road Department paying the remainder. The ownership of the causeway was transferred to the state of Florida.

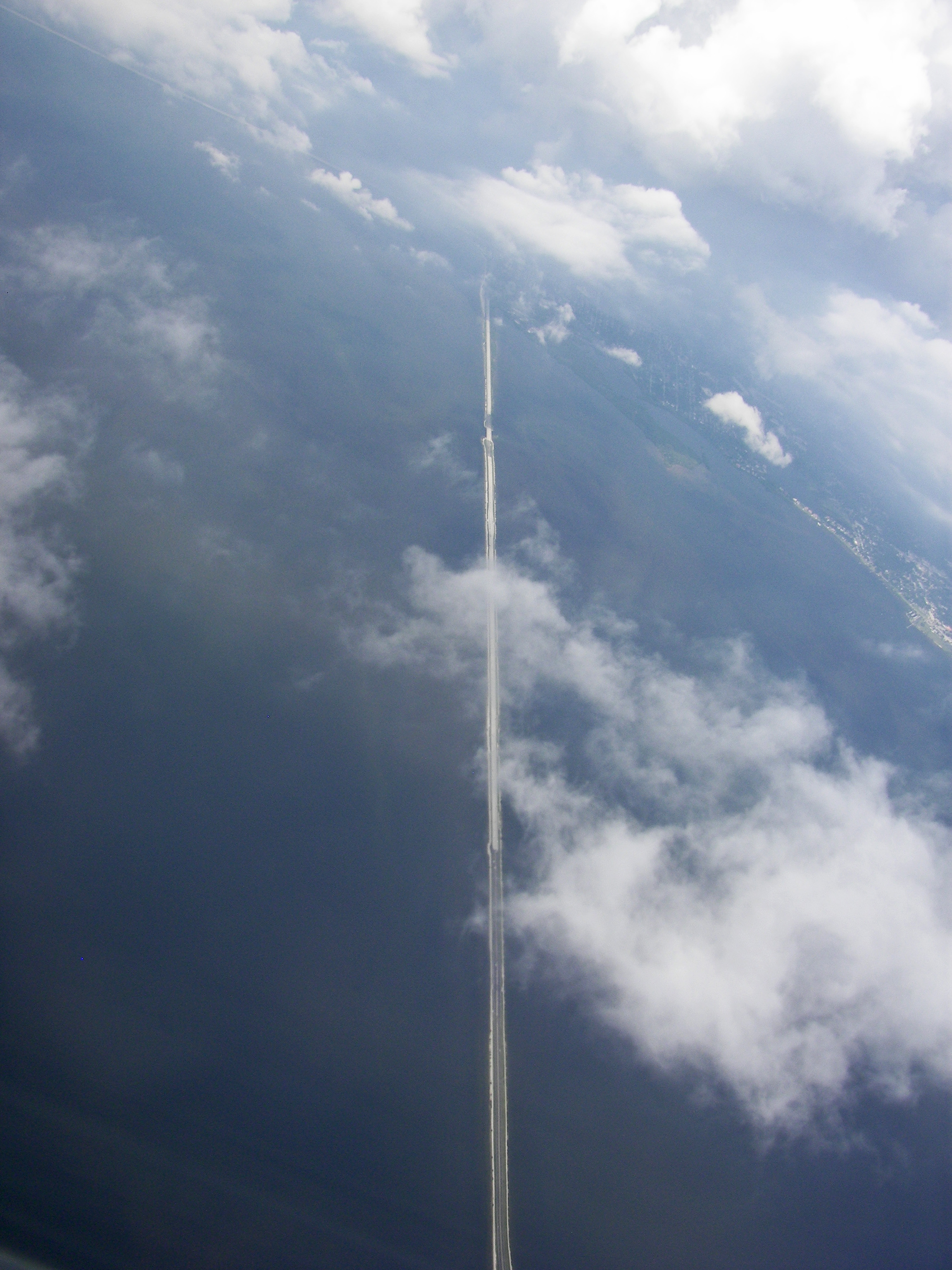
Aerial view from Tampa to Clearwater.

In 1948, the Davis Causeway was renamed for Courtney W. Campbell, a Clearwater Beach resident, U.S. Representative, and member of the Florida Road Board who spearheaded efforts to ensure needed repairs and beautification of the Causeway was completed.

Because of the confusion resulting from the name change, George T. Davis, grandson of Ben T. Davis, campaigned for a return to the original name, with the beautification project being dedicated to Courtney Campbell. George Davis gathered significant support from the community, who felt the bridge should properly bear the name of its builder, who underwent significant hardship to see his dream realized, rather than bear the name of a person with influence on the State Road Department as a Road Board member.

In 2005, the Causeway was designated as an official scenic highway by the state of Florida.

== Today ==
In its current form, the Courtney Campbell Causeway stretches approximately 9.9 miles (15.9 km) from eastern Clearwater to Tampa's Rocky Point island and subsequently to the mainland of western Tampa. The topographical causeway is broken by two elevated spans that allow watercraft access to and from Old Tampa Bay.

There are two beaches along the Causeway: the Ben T. Davis Municipal Beach, maintained by the City of Tampa at the east end, and an unnamed beach owned by the Florida Department of Transportation on the west end. Frontage roads accessible at several points along the route run alongside the main four-lane road and are broken up by the bridge spans. A public boat ramp exists on the northern side just east of the largest bridge span.

Because of its lower capacity, lower posted speed limits, and lack of elevation coupled with the numerous palm and mangrove vegetation along the route, the Causeway offers some of the most picturesque views of any major road in the Tampa Bay area.

In 2007, the Florida DOT conducted a study to further enhance the Causeway with the addition of a recreational trail, supplanting the less-used frontage road on the north side.

In 2010, Florida DOT constructed a service road as part of the Airport Interchange project. When the gate is unlocked, this serves as a bike path connecting Cypress Road (at Cypress Point Park), Tampa to the Causeway and Rocky Point Island. Additionally, a bike path connecting the Causeway to Dana Shores Drive and Town 'n' Country (with a street connection to the Upper Tampa Bay Trail) has been paved. In Pinellas County, the causeway trail connects to the Ream Wilson Clearwater Trail and, thereby, to the Pinellas Trail. Given the demolition of the Friendship Trail Bridge, this bicycle link has become another connection across Tampa Bay.

In January 2018, construction began on a new water channel through the eastern side of the causeway. The new channel was needed to improve water quality in parts of Old Tampa Bay north of the causeway. The channel will be spanned by a 230-foot (70 m) bridge without supporting piers in the water, a design that will avoid trash and pollutants being caught on piers in the water. The project completed construction in July 2019.

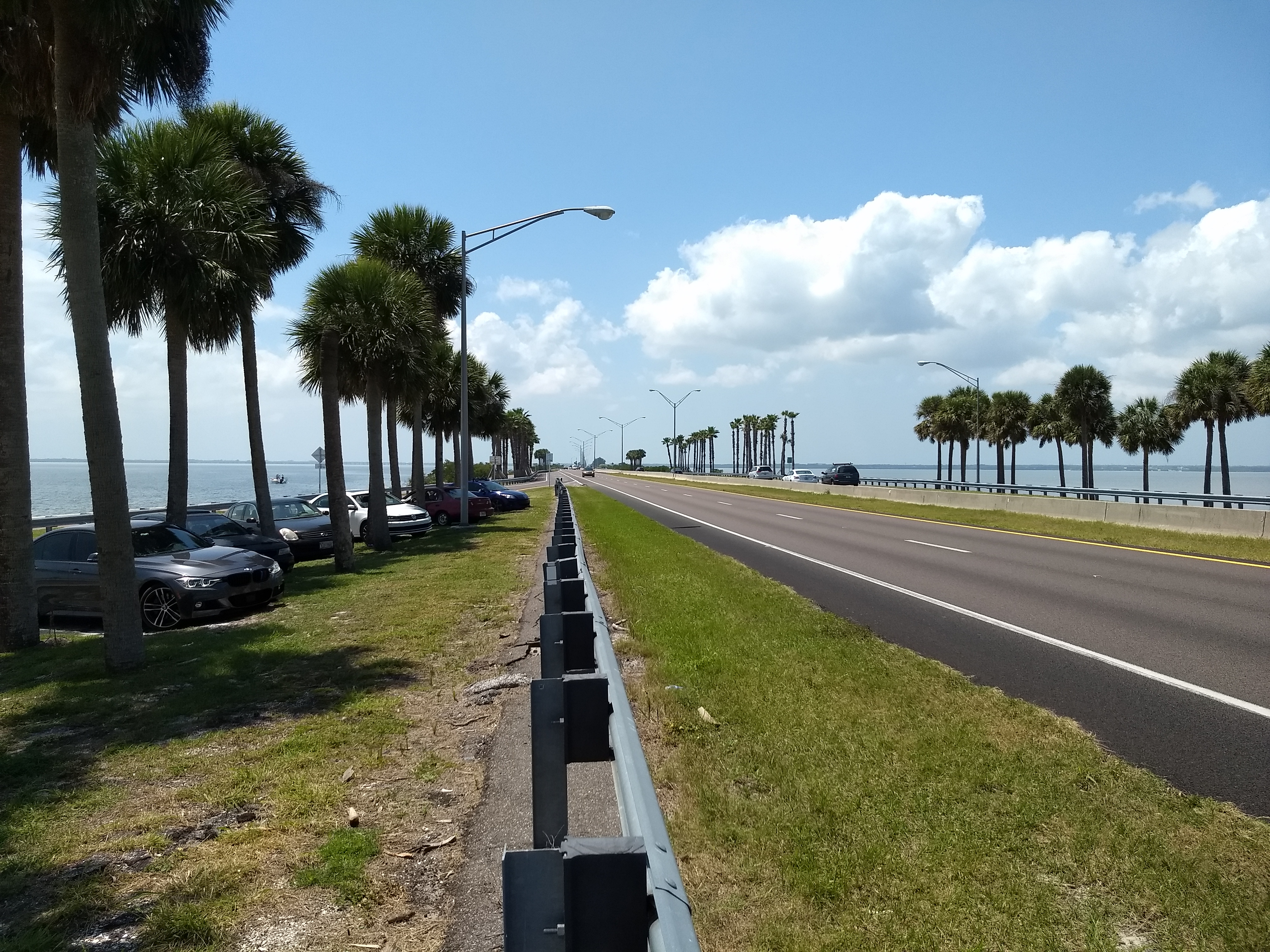
View towards west (Clearwater) near middle of the causeway

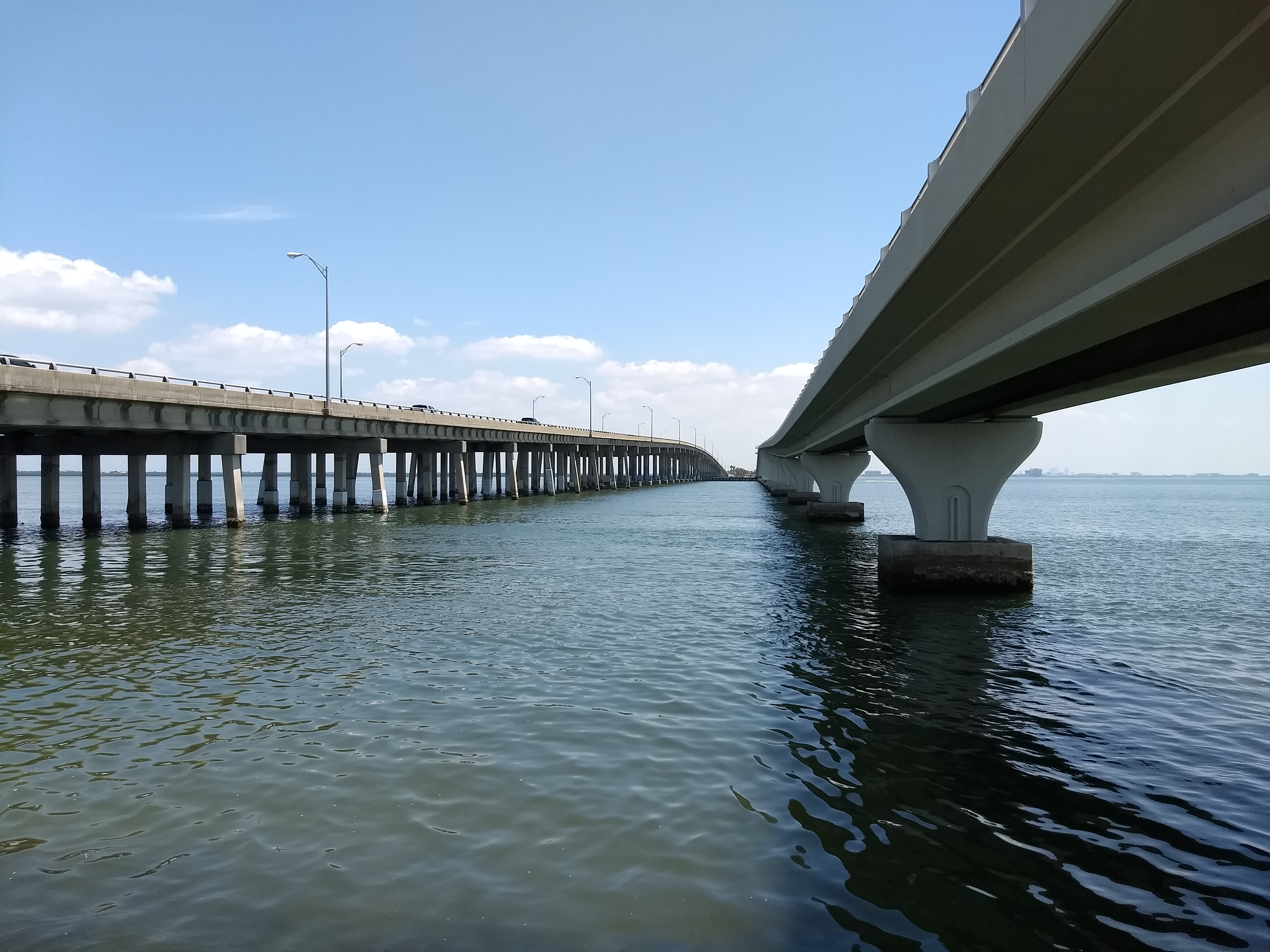
Highway (left) and pedestrian (right) bridges crossing the largest water channel through the causeway

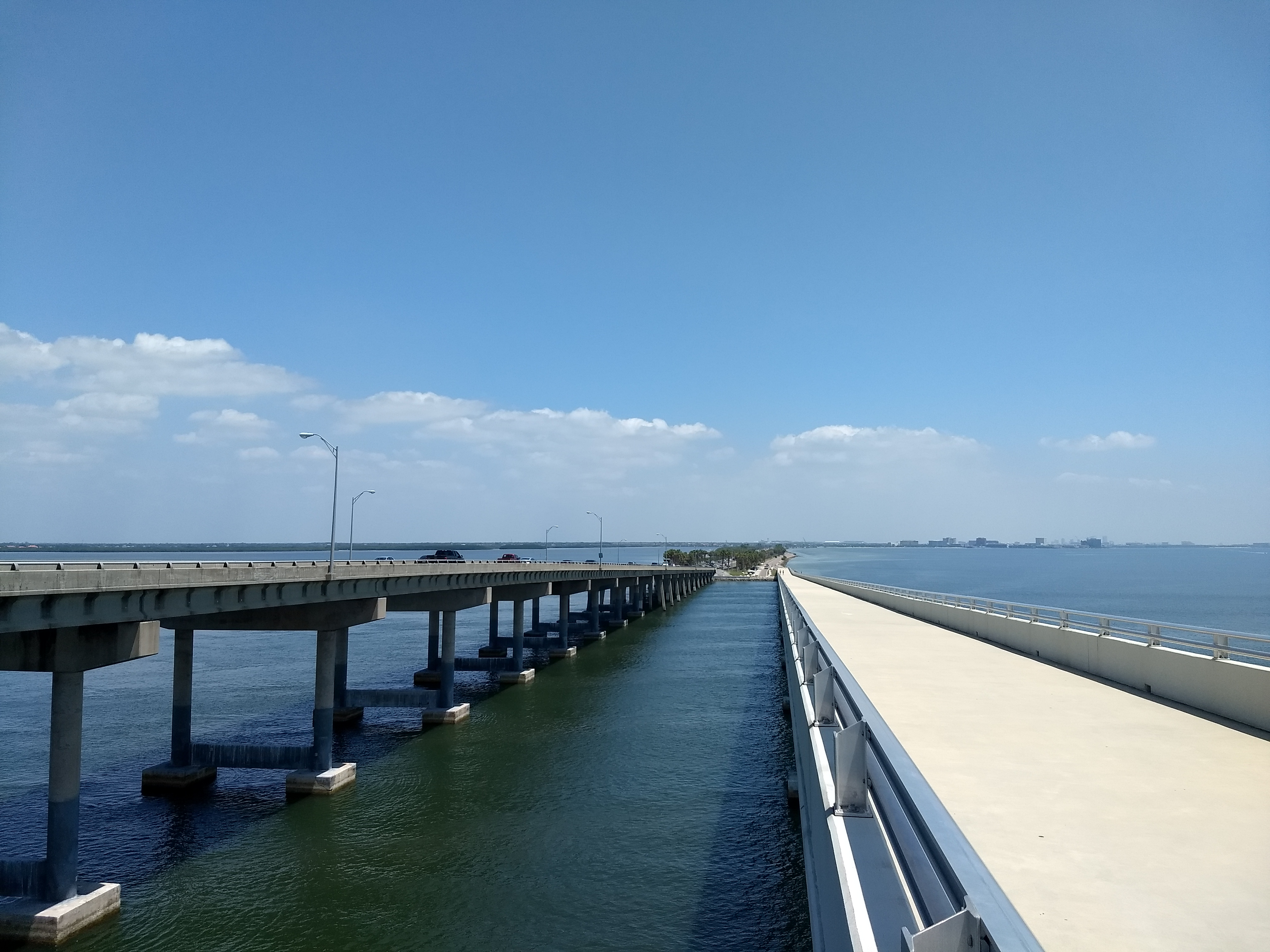
View towards east (Tampa) from pedestrian trail bridge of the largest water channel cutting through the causeway

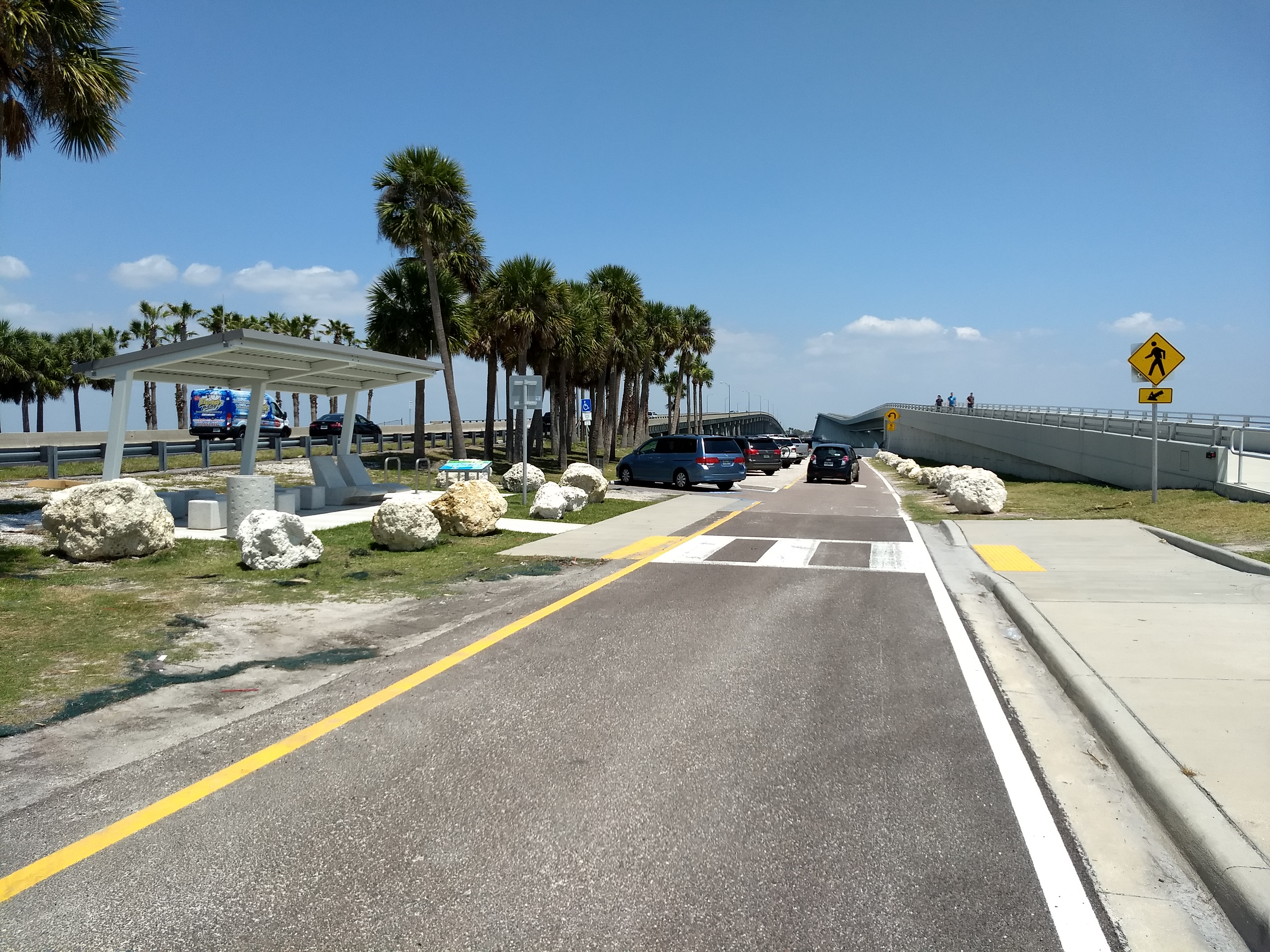
Free parking lot and one of the ten art-deco 'lounges' (left) along Hillsborough side of the trail

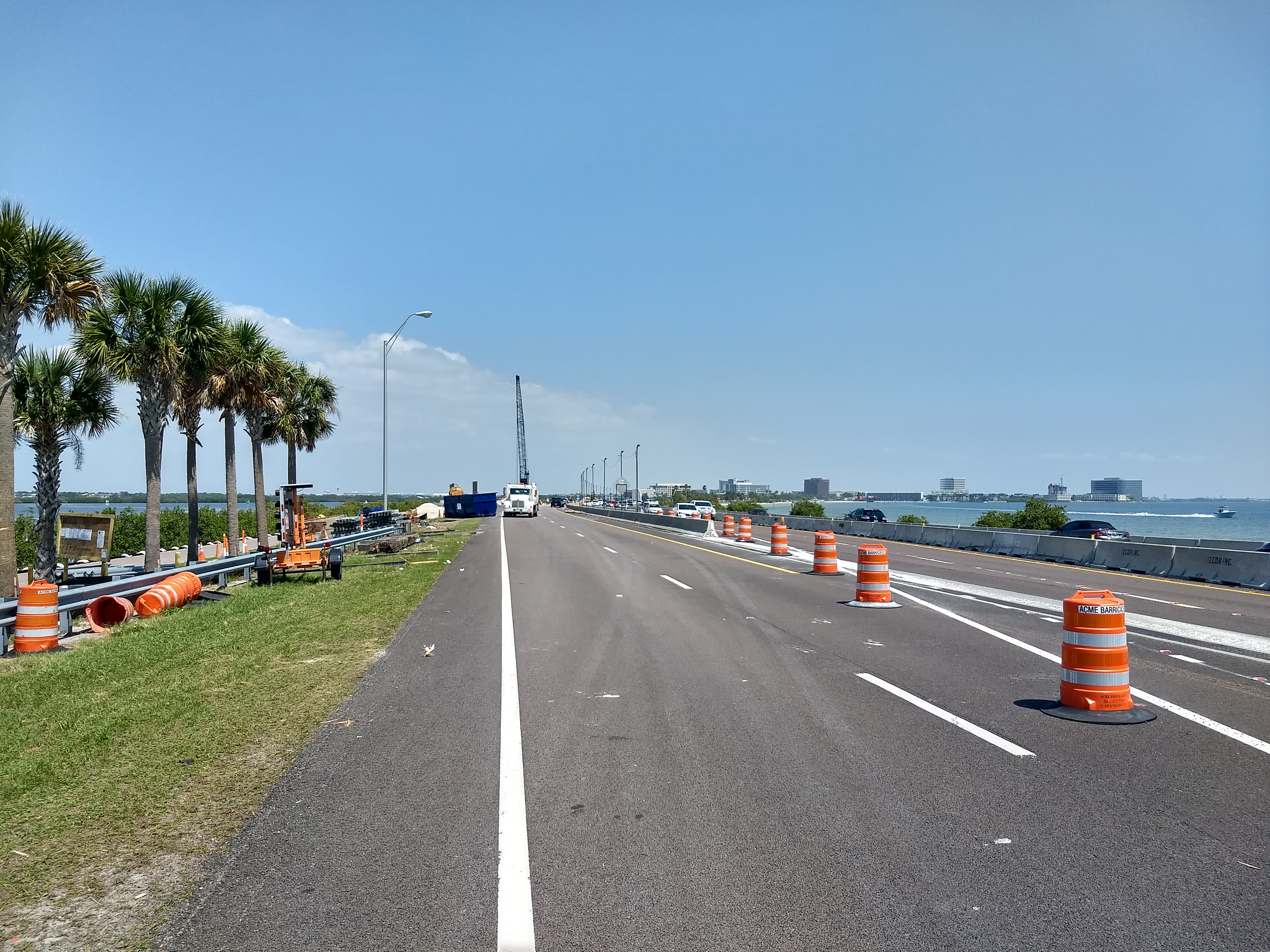
Construction on a new water channel and bridge near the eastern end of the causeway (April 2018)
