= Gandy Bridge =

Bridge in Florida, United States

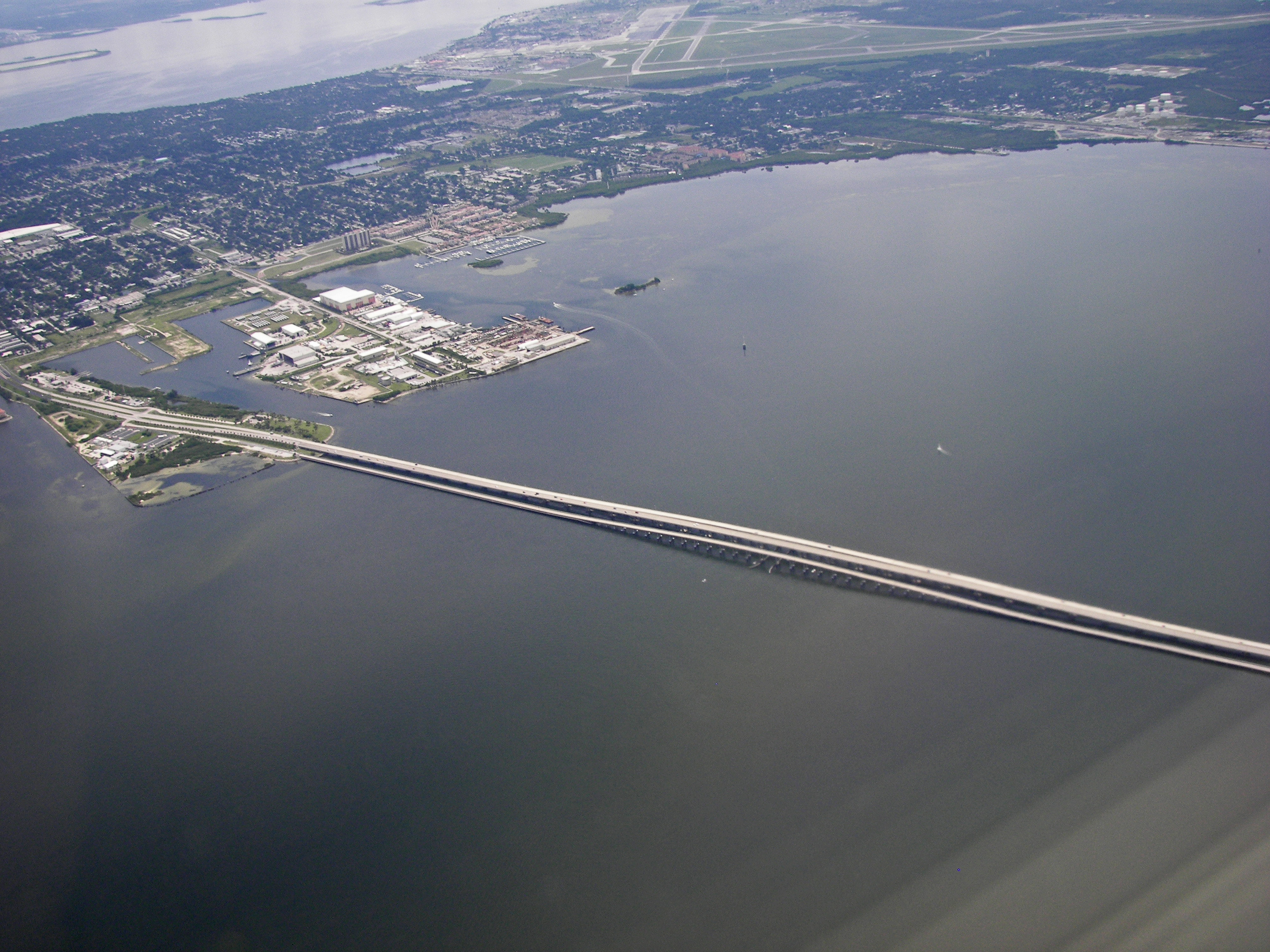
- Coordinates: 27°53′10″N 82°33′30″W\
- Carries: US 92
- Crosses: Old Tampa Bay
- Locale: St. Petersburg to Tampa, Florida
- Maintained by: Florida Department of Transportation
- ID number: 100300 (eastbound); 100585 (westbound)

Characteristics
- Total length: 14,859 ft (4,529 m) (eastbound); 13,886 ft (4,232 m) (westbound)
- Width: 40.4 ft (12.3 m) (eastbound); 39.7 ft (12.1 m) (westbound)
- Clearance below: 43 ft (13 m)

History
- Opened: 1924 (demolished 1975); 1956 (closed 1997–demolished 2015); 1975 (eastbound); 1997 (westbound)

Statistics
- Daily traffic: 37,500 (2019)

Location
- Interactive map of Gandy Bridge

Gandy Bridge is a bridge spanning Old Tampa Bay from St. Petersburg, Florida to Tampa, Florida. The original 1924 span was dismantled in 1975. The second span, constructed in 1956, was used for vehicular traffic until 1997. The third (1975) and fourth (1996) spans of the Gandy Bridge are currently being used for US 92 vehicle traffic, carrying eastbound and westbound respectively.

From 1997 until its 2016 demolition, the 1956 span was known as the Friendship Trail Bridge. The northernmost of the three parallel spans was reserved for non-motorized recreational use.

Almost three miles long, the Gandy Bridge is the southernmost of three bridges connecting the mainland of Hillsborough County and Pinellas County; the others being the Howard Frankland Bridge and the Courtney Campbell Causeway.

== History ==
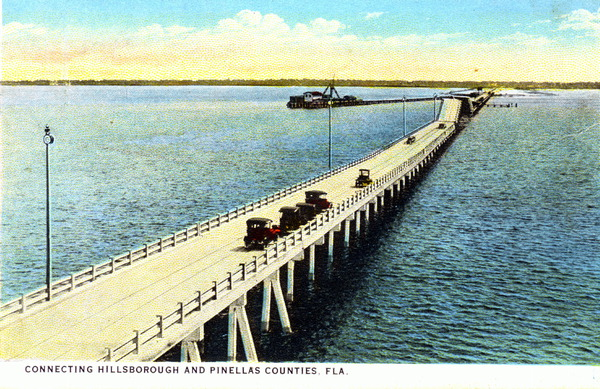
The original span of Gandy Bridge

In 1910, H. Walter Fuller was a director of three companies owned by F. A. Davis. George S. Gandy Sr was the president of all three companies. Fuller prepared a map including a proposed bridge that would cross upper Tampa Bay following the route of Ninth Street North in St. Petersburg. Gandy partnered with Fuller, incorporating three companies towards design and construction of the bridge. Survey crews decided to change the route from Ninth Street to Fourth Street. In 1918, World War I required that all projects exceeding $250,000 required a certificate of necessity from the War Industries Board headed by Bernard Baruch. The project was not approved and financing was canceled. Gandy bought out Fuller's interests and continued alone. In 1922, Gandy hired promoter Eugene M. Elliott to attract new investment. Gandy sold enough stock to finance the bridge, which cost $1.932 million. Construction began in September 1922 and the bridge was completed for a formal opening on November 20, 1924. The steel and concrete bridge spanned a distance of two and a half miles, making it the longest automobile toll bridge in the world at that time. Its double steel bascule drawbridge had a clearance span of 75 feet (23 m) and operated electrically. The original toll to cross the bridge was $.75 for an automobile and driver and $.10 for additional passengers. The bridge stopped collecting tolls on April 27, 1944, after it was seized by the administration of Franklin D. Roosevelt. On December 23, 1945, a federal jury awarded The Gandy Company $2,383,642 in compensation for the property, plus $100,000 in interest.

The bridge reduced the distance between Tampa and St. Petersburg from 43 to 19 miles (31 km). Its location enabled travel by auto along the route of the world's first scheduled airline flight, which operated between Tampa and Saint Petersburg for six months in 1914. Sixteen visiting state governors and several foreign dignitaries attended the opening ceremony. During George Gandy's speech, he stated; "The bridge is built!"

A renovation to the bridge deck occurred in 1947, which removed the streetcar tracks and added a counter line.

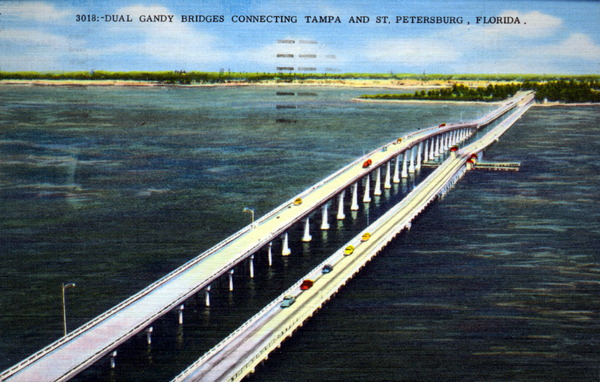
A second span was added in 1956

By 1947, state Sen. Raymond Sheldon described the bridge as "outmoded, too narrow and a traffic bottleneck." In 1956 a second fixed span was added to the Gandy Bridge to serve westbound traffic. The first span would then serve eastbound traffic.

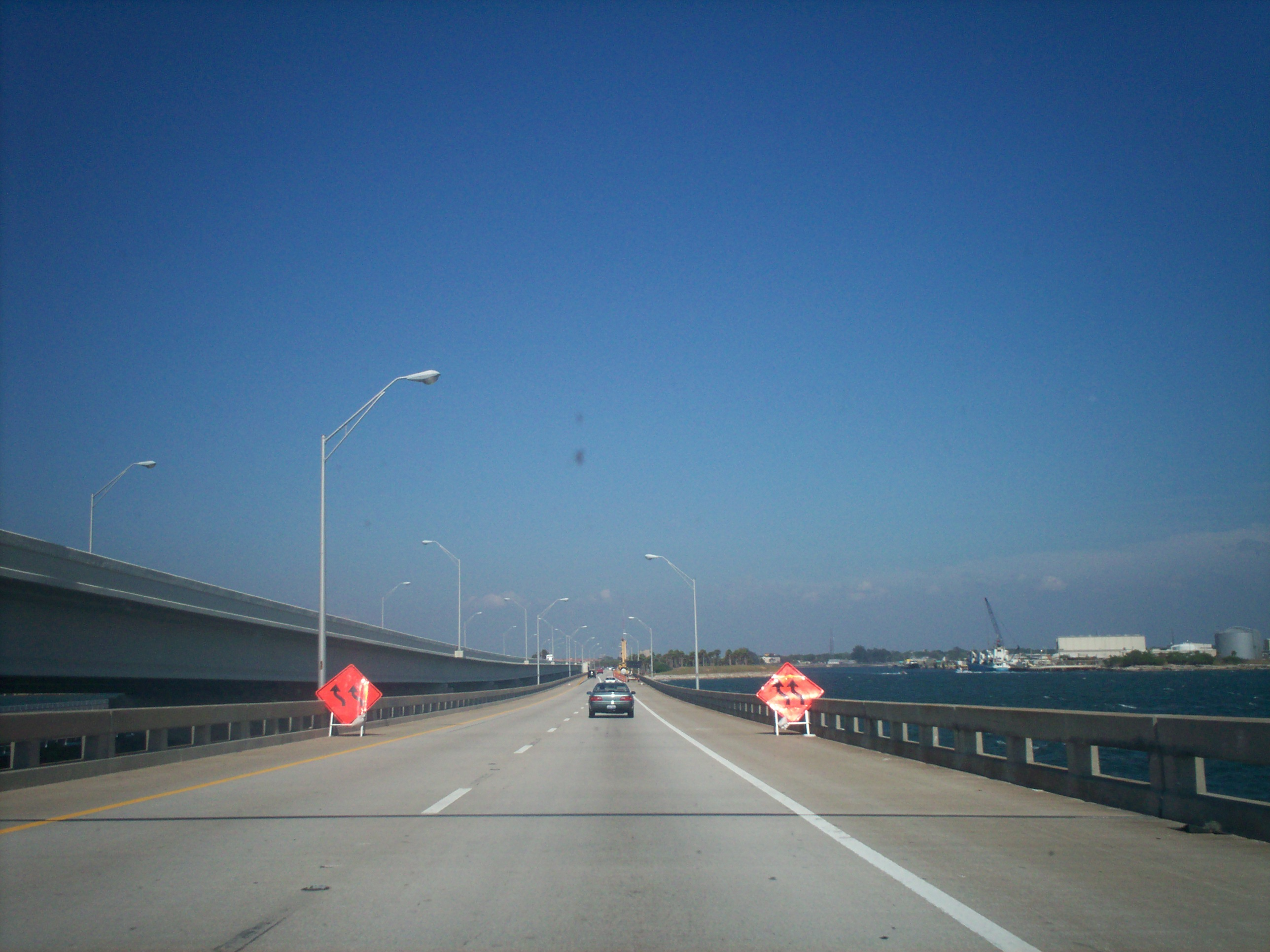
Traveling across the 1975 (eastbound) bridge with the 1997 (westbound) bridge to the left

A third span was opened to traffic on October 20, 1975, and was without street lighting. It was built along the south side of the original span. The new bridge replaced the original span which was immediately dismantled, while the fixed span was converted to carrying westbound traffic.

On December 21, 1996, another parallel span was built in between the two existing spans to replace the aging 1956 bridge. The new bridge, which was built right over where the first (1927) span once stood and thus north of the third span, was initially opened to eastbound traffic while the 1975 bridge was closed to allow FDOT to install street lighting and conduct other bridge work. Westbound traffic at that time continued to utilize the 1956 bridge. The 1996 bridge was converted to westbound traffic in February 1997, while the 1956 span became the non-motorized Friendship Trail. The differences between the three bridges were obvious to observers. The westbound span is nine feet higher than the older eastbound span, and has a more gradual hump than its counterpart. The design and architecture of the westbound bridge is similar in design to the Clearwater Pass Bridge replacement, which was completed in 1994.

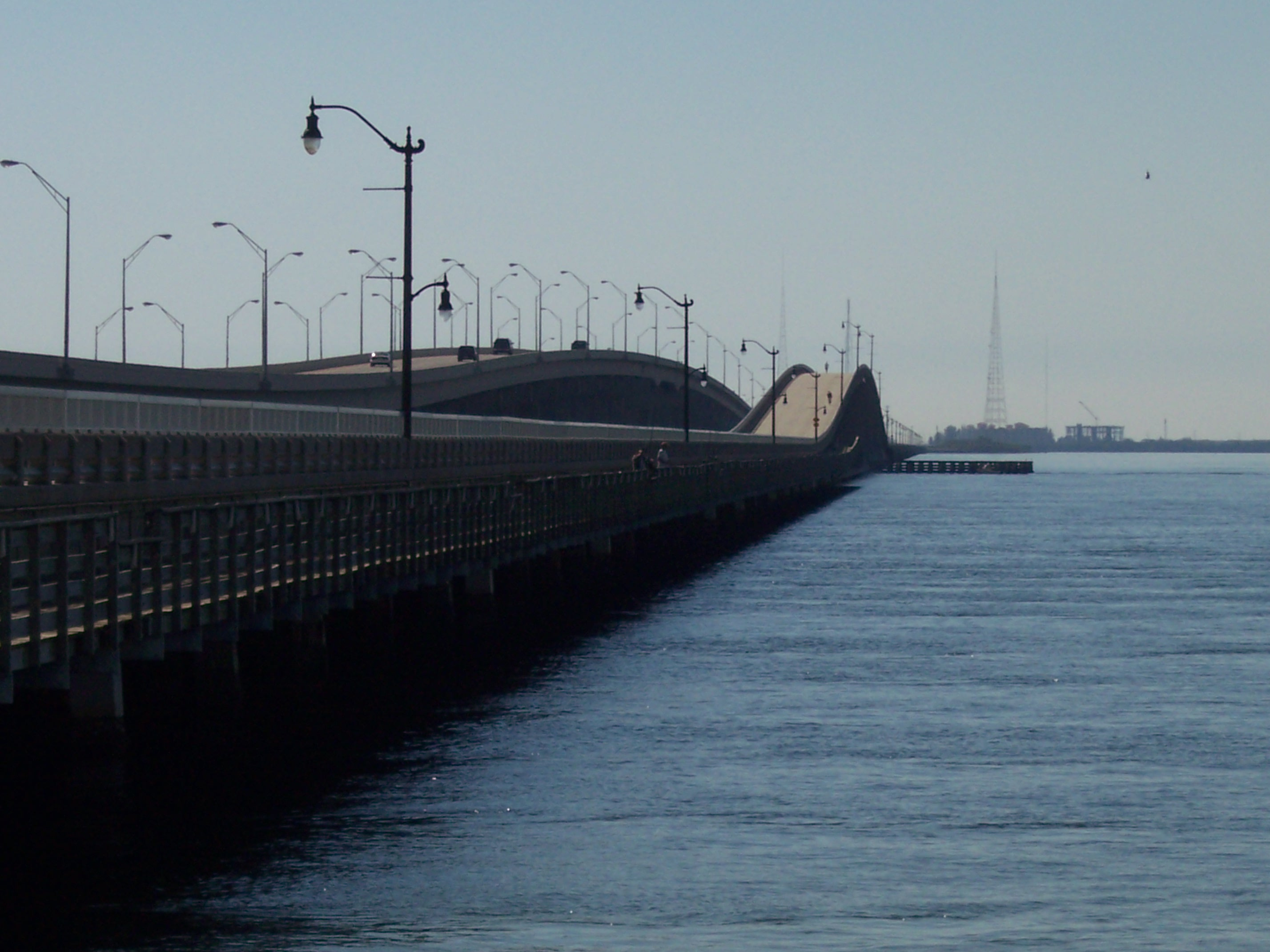
The 1956 span was opened to pedestrian and recreational use from 1999 until 2008

On November 6, 2008, the Friendship Trail was shut down "indefinitely" (though the ends remained open) after a state inspection determined that there were significant structural problems with the bridge's superstructure. The bridge had been decaying for years, eventually forcing the closure of the span to vehicular traffic. However, the inspection yielded that the corrosion of the superstructure had worsened and that the overall condition of the bridge was no longer suitable to keep it open due to safety issues. Only a couple months before, the Sunshine Skyway Bridge's fishing piers were deemed to the same fate (A recent inspection there had forced the closure of the eastern span on both the northern and southern piers). There was also a repair plan in place for the bridge that would have repaired the pylons at a cost of $4.2 million. That project was cancelled due to the new developments. December 17 brought further gloom for the trail when preliminary estimates to retrofit the bridge added up to about $30 million. Furthermore, the projected costs would only provide a temporary solution to the structure that would only last about ten years. With the state and the nation in recession, county governments saw no way to meet the staggering costs, leaving the trail likely closed for good. December 20, 2008 a report done by Kisinger Campo & Associates and SDR Engineering Consultants showed that the bridge could potentially collapse due to the amount of decay on the structure. Immediately after the report was released, Hillsborough and Pinellas County officials decided to close the entire bridge permanently. The report suggested the following:

- $4.1 million to retrofit both ends of the bridge only
- $13 million to demolish the bridge only
- $30 million to retrofit the entire structure
- $81.1 million to demolish and rebuild the bridge

In May 2009, the initial estimates were revised:

- $10 million to retrofit both ends of the bridge only
- $13 million to demolish the bridge only
- $15 million to retrofit the entire structure
- $19 million to demolish and rebuild fishing piers

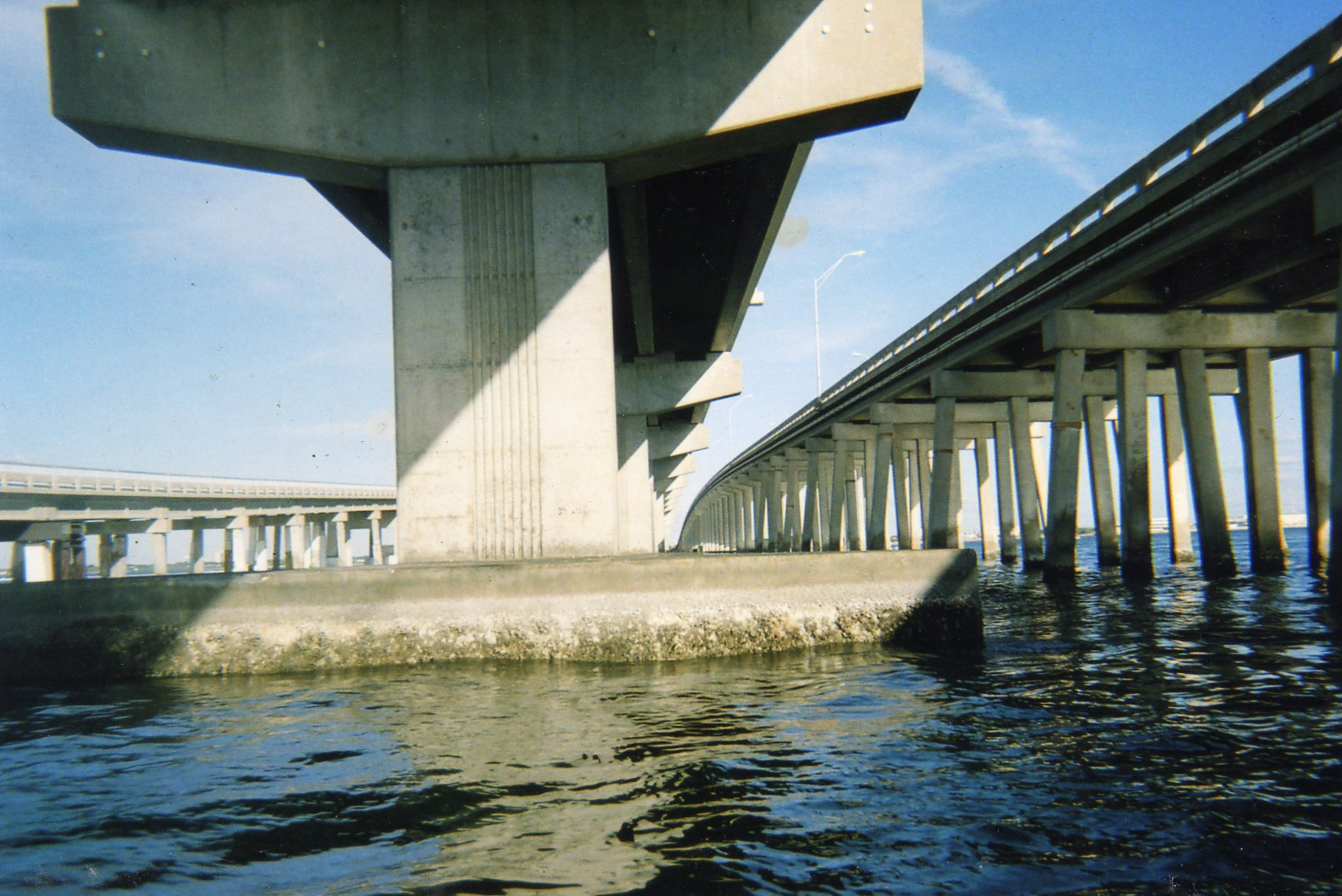
The piers of the Gandy Bridges, with the 1956 span in the left, the 1996 span in the middle, and the 1975 span in the right.

After a series of meetings in May, June, and July 2009, the Friendship Trail bridge oversight committee voted to explore the $15 million option to retrofit the entire bridge, which would add about 10 years to its lifespan, with supporters hoping that it would be funded by the American Recovery and Reinvestment Act. A peer review done by E.C. Driver and Associates disagreed on the repair estimate claiming it would take $48 million to repair the bridge. Also in July 2009, the animal rights group, People for the Ethical Treatment of Animals (PETA) offered to contribute funds to help save the Friendship Trail. However, the group asked for fishing to be banned throughout the entire span. In April 2010, both Hillsborough and Pinellas County Commissions voted to demolish the entire structure. In March 2011, citizens came together to save the bridge again, proposing a public/private partnership to fund repairs. In April 2011, Hillsborough County Commission voted to delay the demolition in order to give a group of citizens 30 days to come up with a viable plan to repair and re-open the bridge On June 27, 2012, the Hillsborough County Commission voted to allow the group more time to evaluate their options for the bridge. It would also allow the commission to decide on a plan to possibly present a referendum to voters in November to hike the property tax to fund park improvements. Despite the various community efforts to save the bridge, none were able to fully materialize. Gradual demolition work was underway by 2015, and was completed as of July 2016.

=== Future ===
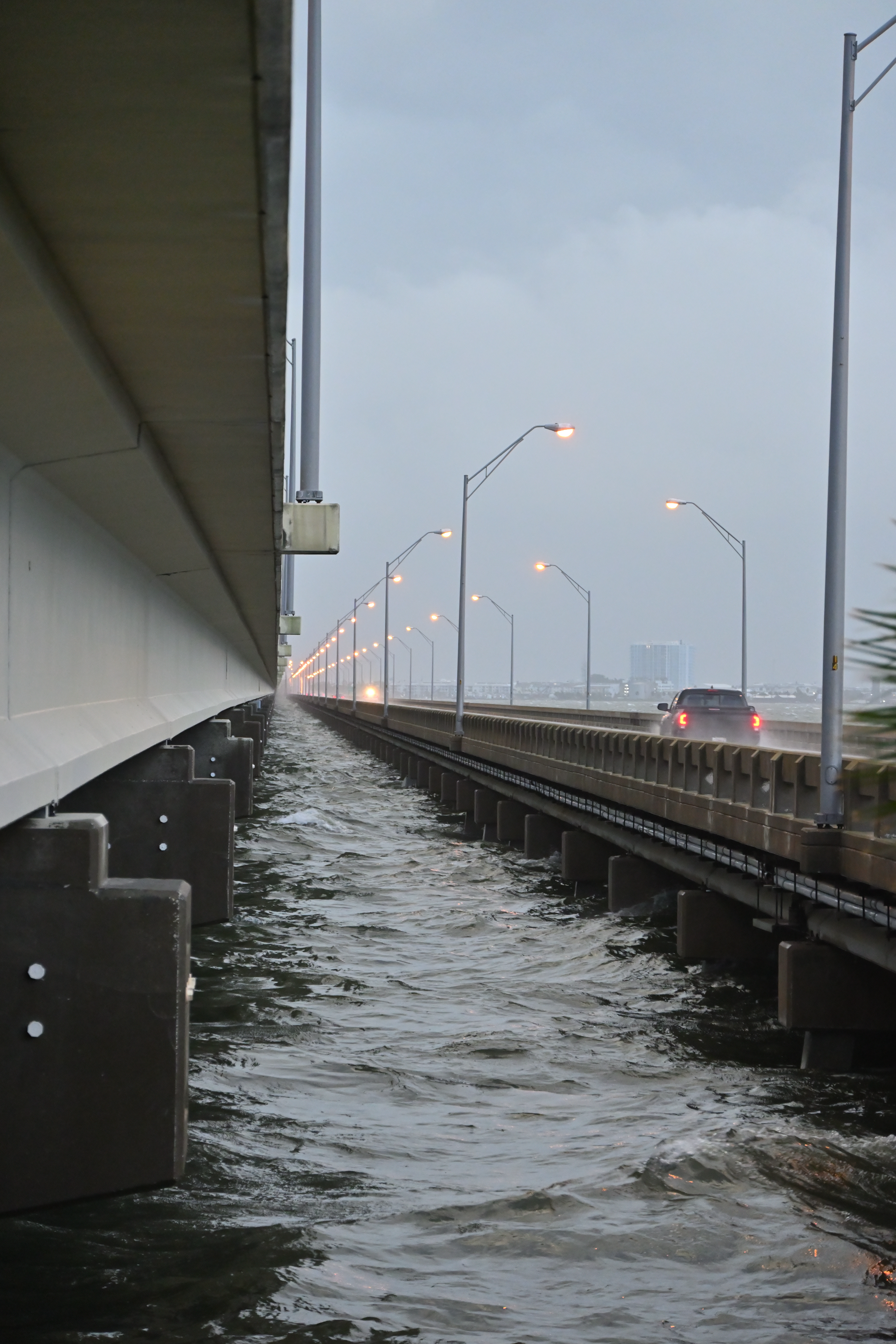
Waves crashing against pile caps of the 1975 span during a 4-foot storm surge from Hurricane Idalia. Its low height is vulnerable to storm surge.

In June 2021, FDOT announced that it is conducting a study to construct a fifth span to eventually replace the aging third (1975) span. The new span is slated to be constructed along the north side of the fourth (1996) span, perhaps right over where the second (1956) span once stood. While the agency has identified that work will include widening the fourth span, it is currently unclear as to whether the span will only have widened shoulders, or if an additional travel lane will be added. It is also unclear as to how many lanes the new span will have, though a trail component will be included to replace the trail link lost when the second span was demolished, thus fully reactivating the Friendship Trail. Should FDOT commence with the project, the design phase will begin sometime in 2025. Upon completion of the fifth span, all three Pinellas-Hillsborough bridge crossings over Old Tampa Bay will have trail components. Also, the fifth span will serve westbound traffic while the fourth span will switch to handling eastbound traffic.

=== History ===
- 1924-1956: 1924 span built as two-lane, two-way bridge.
- 1956-1975: 1956 span built for westbound traffic, 1924 span used for eastbound traffic.
- 1975-1996: 1956 span used for westbound traffic, 1975 span built for eastbound traffic. 1924 span demolished.
- 1996-1997: 1956 span used for westbound traffic, 1996 span built for eastbound traffic. 1975 span closed for retrofitting.
- 1997-2008: 1996 span used for westbound traffic, 1975 span used for eastbound traffic. 1956 span used as the pedestrian and recreational use "Friendship Trail Bridge".
- 2008–2016: 1996 span used for westbound traffic, 1975 span used for eastbound traffic. 1956 span disused and closed.
- 2016–present: 1996 span used for westbound traffic, 1975 span used for eastbound traffic. 1956 span fully demolished.
- Future: Future span to be built for westbound traffic, 1996 span to be used for eastbound traffic. 1975 span to be demolished.

== Mishap history ==
Several barges have struck one of the spans of the Gandy Bridge throughout the years.

- December 12, 1970: A barge hits the drawbridge when it doesn't open in time, cracking several pilings
- February 6, 1981: The barge Liquilassie, towed by the tug Tusker, swings wide on a starboard turn and strikes Gandy Bridge, damaging a support column.
- August 31, 1985: Two barges break their moorings and, powered by waves from Hurricane Elena, crash into the southernmost span of the bridge.
- March 31, 1988: The shrimp boat Madonna T. Tillman sinks after striking the center of the bridge while being towed by another shrimp boat.
- March 31, 2006: The 285-foot-long steel barge Apache, towed by the tug Crosby Skipper, swings wide on a turn and slams into a concrete support column. Chunks of reinforced concrete dropped onto the barge's deck, and cracks rippled through the 48-foot-long beam.
