= F. A. Davis =

F. A. Davis.

Frank Allston Davis (September 8, 1850 – January 2, 1917) was a publishing executive who founded the F. A. Davis Company in Philadelphia, Pennsylvania. After moving to the Tampa Bay Area, he introduced electricity to St. Petersburg, Florida, and founded the city of Pinellas Park.

== Early life ==
Davis was born in Duxbury, Vermont, and, as a child, worked as a groundskeeper and attended school. His mother died in 1861, after which he lived with Samuel Cook Turner. He worked as a lawnmower salesman in Asbury Park, New Jersey, during the summer of 1870. By 1872, he earned $30 per month as a teacher.

Davis relocated to Philadelphia and worked as an agent for several publishing firms. He married Lizzie Fritz and their son, Alonzo, was born in 1873. In 1879, he was working as an agent for the largest medical publisher in the world, William Wood and Company when he formed his own publishing company, F. A. Davis Company. Similar to William Wood, Davis's company specialized in publishing medical material including medical studies. Davis's first wife died in the 1880s.

== Florida ==
On April 29, 1885, Davis attended an American Medical Association meeting which included a study about the benefits of the Pinellas peninsula. Davis eventually published the study and, in 1889, he travelled to Tarpon Springs, Florida. He felt improvement in his muscular rheumatism and advertised for Florida in one of his medical journals. In Tarpon Springs he met Jacob Disston, the brother of Florida land baron Hamilton Disston. Davis and Disston combined to bring electricity to Tarpon Springs in 1895. In the same year, Davis married Elizabeth Irene Craven.

Electricity had little impact on Tarpon Springs, so Davis received an electricity franchise from St. Petersburg on February 2, 1897, and moved his plant there. St. Petersburg's first wood-powered electrical service was initiated on August 5, 1897. On February 4, 1902, Davis was granted a trolley franchise by St. Petersburg. He paid for trolley construction with funding from Jacob Disston and others, and by purchasing and re-selling the city's phone system. Trolley construction began on May 30, 1904, and operation began four months later. In 1905, he expanded the trolley system to Disston City. Through his publishing company, Davis promoted the area with Florida magazine in 1905 and two books in 1906. Continuing to expand his influence in St. Petersburg, Davis tore down the Brantley Pier and built the Electric Pier in 1906. He paid $80,000 for a 500-passenger steamboat named Favorite which first arrived on October 17, 1906, and was a popular attraction at the Electric Pier.

Davis's progress – and St. Petersburg's in general – was hampered when Tampa tycoon Henry B. Plant purchased the city's lifeline, the Orange Belt Railroad, in 1906. Davis was dealt another blow by the banking panic of 1907. Two years later, he shifted control of much of his St. Petersburg holdings to his occasional rival, H. Walter Fuller. After a conflict over St. Petersburg waterfront area, Davis purchased 12,800 acres (52 km^{2}) of Hamilton Disston's land around 1911 and established the city of Pinellas Park. Davis, his son, and P. J. McDevitt advertised the new city, drawing people from Pennsylvania and Ohio. McDevitt became the city's first mayor. Davis sold a free lot in Pinellas Park for every ten-acre farm purchased, resulting in 111 farm sales from 1910 to 1912. Lack of drainage in Pinellas Park caused problems in August 1915, when 15 inches (380 mm) of rain fell.

Davis died in Philadelphia from heart failure, reportedly due to World War I and concern over his estate. Jacob Disston closed out Davis's remaining holdings in Florida while his wife, Elizabeth, remained involved with F. A. Davis Company until her death in 1964.
