= List of historic houses in Florida =

This is a list of historic houses in Florida.

== Brevard County ==
- Benson House
- Green Gables
- H. S. Williams House
- Dr. George E. Hill House
- James Wadsworth Rossetter House
- Nannie Lee House
- Pink House
- Porcher House
- Pritchard House
- Judge George Robbins House
- Roesch House
- Spell House
- Taylor-Dunn House
- Wager House
- William H. Gleason House
- Winchester Symphony House

== Hillsborough County ==
- A. M. Lamb House
- A. P. Dickman House
- George Guida, Sr. House
- George McA. Miller House
- Horace T. Robles House
- House at 84 Adalia Avenue
- House at 97 Adriatic Avenue
- House at 36 Aegean Avenue
- House at 53 Aegean Avenue
- House at 59 Aegean Avenue
- House at 124 Baltic Circle
- House at 125 Baltic Circle
- House at 132 Baltic Circle
- House at 202 Blanca Avenue
- House at 220 Blanca Avenue
- House at 418 Blanca Avenue
- House at 161 Bosporous Avenue
- House at 301 Caspian Street
- House at 36 Columbia Drive
- House at 200 Corsica Avenue
- House at 116 West Davis Boulevard
- House at 131 West Davis Boulevard
- Hutchinson House (Tampa, Florida)
- Jackson Rooming House
- Johnson-Wolff House
- Leiman House
- Moseley Homestead
- Seminole Heights Residential District
- Stovall House
- Tampania House
- T. C. Taliaferro House
- William E. Curtis House

== Lee County ==
- Edison and Ford Winter Estates

== Miami-Dade County ==
- William Wagner House

== Orange County ==
- Robert Bruce Barbour House

== Palm Beach County ==
- Riddle House

== Pinellas County ==
- Plumb House

== Polk County ==
- Rev. Wm James Reid House

== Volusia County ==
- Alexander Haynes House
- All Saints Episcopal Church (Enterprise, Florida)
- Amos Kling House
- Anderson–Price Memorial Library Building
- Ann Stevens House
- Bartholomew J. Donnelly House
- Chief Master at Arms House
- DeBary Hall
- Delos A. Blodgett House
- Dix House
- El Real Retiro
- Howard Thurman House
- John Anderson Lodge
- John B. Stetson House
- Kilkoff House
- Lippincott Mansion
- Louis P. Thursby House
- Mary McLeod Bethune Home
- Moulton–Wells House
- Nathan Cobb Cottage
- Rogers House (Daytona Beach, Florida)
- Rowallan
- Seminole Rest
- Seth French House
- Stockton-Lindquist House
- Talahloka
- The Abbey (Daytona Beach, Florida)
- The Casements
- Cypress Street Elementary School
- The Hammocks
- The Porches

== See also ==
- List of historic houses
- National Register of Historic Places listings in Florida
