= James Church Alvord =

American poet

James Church Alvord (January 24, 1862 – February 18, 1939) was an American poet from Greenfield, Massachusetts who flourished in the early years of the 20th century. A handful of his poems were published in Poetry Magazine, and are available in its online archives. Others appeared in general magazines such as The Nation and The Century Magazine. In addition, the libretto he wrote for a "Scène Dramatique" by the composer Frederick Stevenson, called "An American Ace", is available through the Library of Congress. Before the entry of the United States into the First World War, he published a short story ("The Iron Cross") in a collection produced by the Christian Women's Peace Movement, but as the libretto to "American Ace" shows, by the end of the war he had adopted a rather different stance. In addition to poetry, he also wrote reviews for the New York Times. In the 1920s, he was a Professor of Modern Languages at Centenary College of Louisiana, and wrote the lyrics of the college's Alma Mater.

He died in 1939 in Davis Islands, Florida.
