= House at 100 West Davis Boulevard =

Historic house in Florida, United States

- U.S. National Register of Historic Places
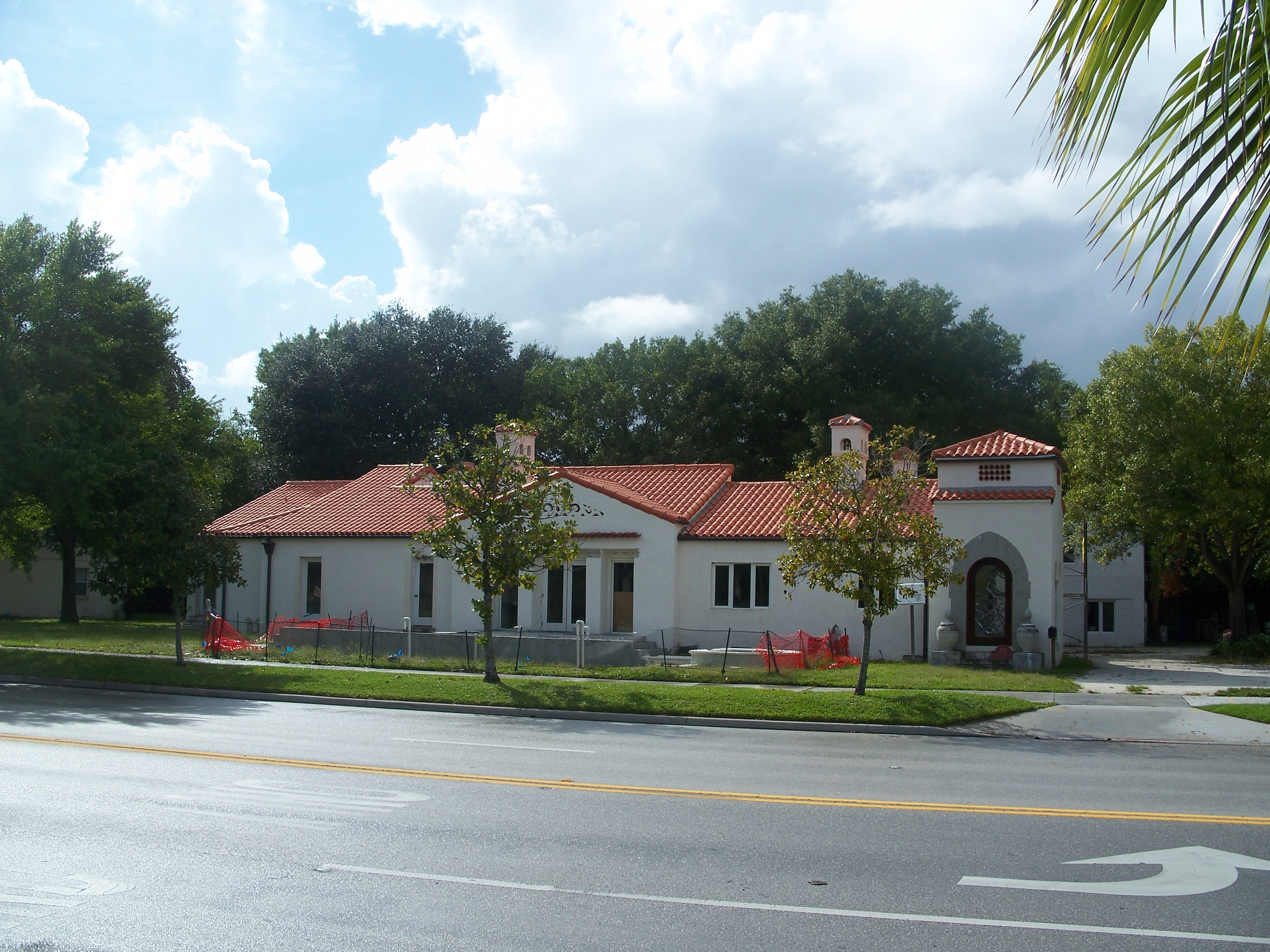

- Location within Florida Location within the United States
- Location: Tampa, Florida
- Coordinates: 27°55′48″N 82°27′25″W
- Architect: Franklin O. Adams, Jr.
- Architectural style: Late 19th And 20th Century Revivals
- MPS: Mediterranean Revival Style Buildings of Davis Islands MPS
- NRHP reference No.: 89000972
- Added to NRHP: August 3, 1989

The House at 100 West Davis Boulevard is a historic home in Tampa, Florida. It is located at 100 West Davis Boulevard. On August 3, 1989, it was added to the U.S. National Register of Historic Places.
