= House at 53 Aegean Avenue =

Historic house in Florida, United States

- U.S. National Register of Historic Places
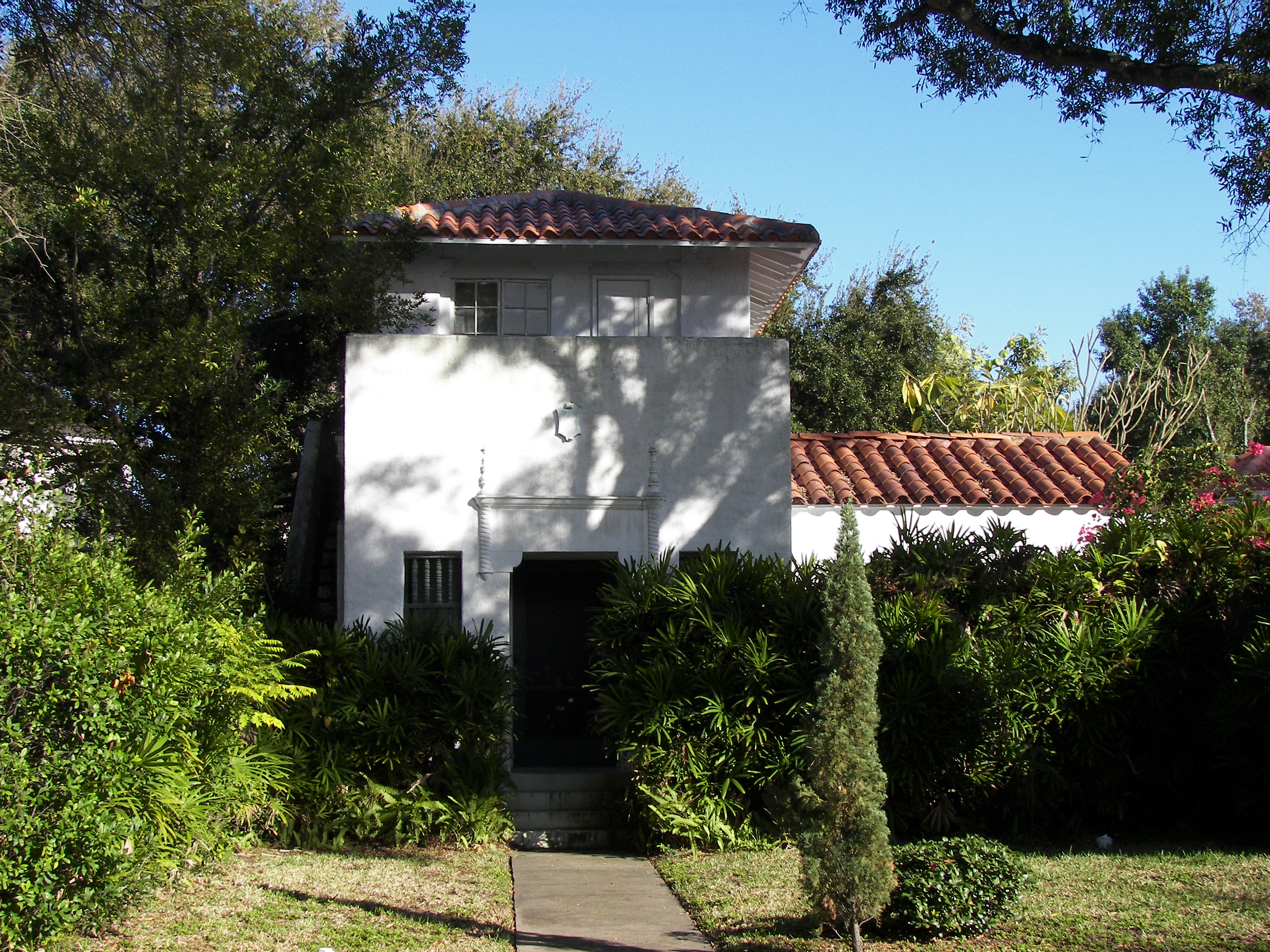

- Location within Florida Location within the United States
- Location: Hillsborough County, Florida, USA
- Nearest city: Tampa, Florida
- Coordinates: 27°55′58″N 82°27′33″W
- Built: 1926
- Architect: Ballinger Engineering Co.
- Architectural style: Mission/Spanish Revival
- MPS: Mediterranean Revival Style Buildings of Davis Islands MPS
- NRHP reference No.: 89000955
- Added to NRHP: August 3, 1989

The House at 53 Aegean Avenue is a historic home in the Davis Islands neighborhood of Tampa, Florida, United States. It is located at 53 Aegean Avenue. On August 3, 1989, it was added to the U.S. National Register of Historic Places.

== References and external links ==
- Hillsborough County listings at National Register of Historic Places
