= List of Mediterranean Revival Style Buildings of Davis Islands =

- Mediterranean Revival Style Buildings of Davis Islands
- U.S. National Register of Historic Places
- Location within Florida Location within the United States
- Location: Tampa, Florida, US
- Coordinates: 27°55′18″N 82°27′21″W
- NRHP reference No.: 64500118
- Added to NRHP: August 3, 1989

The following buildings were added to the National Register of Historic Places as part of the Mediterranean Revival Style Buildings of Davis Islands Multiple Property Submission (or MPS).

A number of them are designed or built by Schumacher & Winkler or by Fred Mayes.

Resource name	Image	Address	Added
Bay Isle Commercial Building		238 East Davis Boulevard	August 3, 1989
House at 100 West Davis Boulevard		100 West Davis Boulevard	August 3, 1989
House at 116 West Davis Boulevard		116 West Davis Boulevard	August 3, 1989
House at 124 Baltic Circle		124 Baltic Circle	August 3, 1989
House at 125 Baltic Circle		125 Baltic Circle	August 3, 1989
House at 131 West Davis Boulevard		131 West Davis Boulevard	August 3, 1989
House at 132 Baltic Circle		132 Baltic Circle	August 3, 1989
House at 161 Bosporous Avenue		161 Bosporous Avenue	August 3, 1989
House at 190 Bosporous Avenue		190 Bosporous Avenue	August 3, 1989
House at 200 Corsica Avenue		200 Corsica Avenue	August 3, 1989
House at 202 Blanca Avenue		202 Blanca Avenue	August 3, 1989
House at 220 Blanca Avenue		220 Blanca Avenue	August 3, 1989
House at 301 Caspian Street		301 Caspian Street	August 3, 1989
House at 36 Aegean Avenue		36 Aegean Avenue	August 3, 1989
House at 36 Columbia Drive		36 Columbia Drive	August 3, 1989
House at 418 Blanca Avenue		418 Blanca Avenue	August 3, 1989
House at 53 Aegean Avenue		53 Aegean Avenue	August 3, 1989
House at 59 Aegean Avenue		59 Aegean Avenue	August 3, 1989
House at 84 Adalia Avenue		84 Adalia Avenue	August 3, 1989
House at 97 Adriatic Avenue		97 Adriatic Avenue	August 3, 1989
Palace of Florence Apartments		45 East Davis Boulevard	August 3, 1989
Palmerin Hotel		115 East Davis Boulevard	August 3, 1989
Spanish Apartments		16 East Davis Boulevard	August 3, 1989

== References and external links ==
- Hillsborough County listings at Florida's Office of Cultural and Historical Programs
