= House at 125 Baltic Circle =

Historic house in Florida, United States

- U.S. National Register of Historic Places
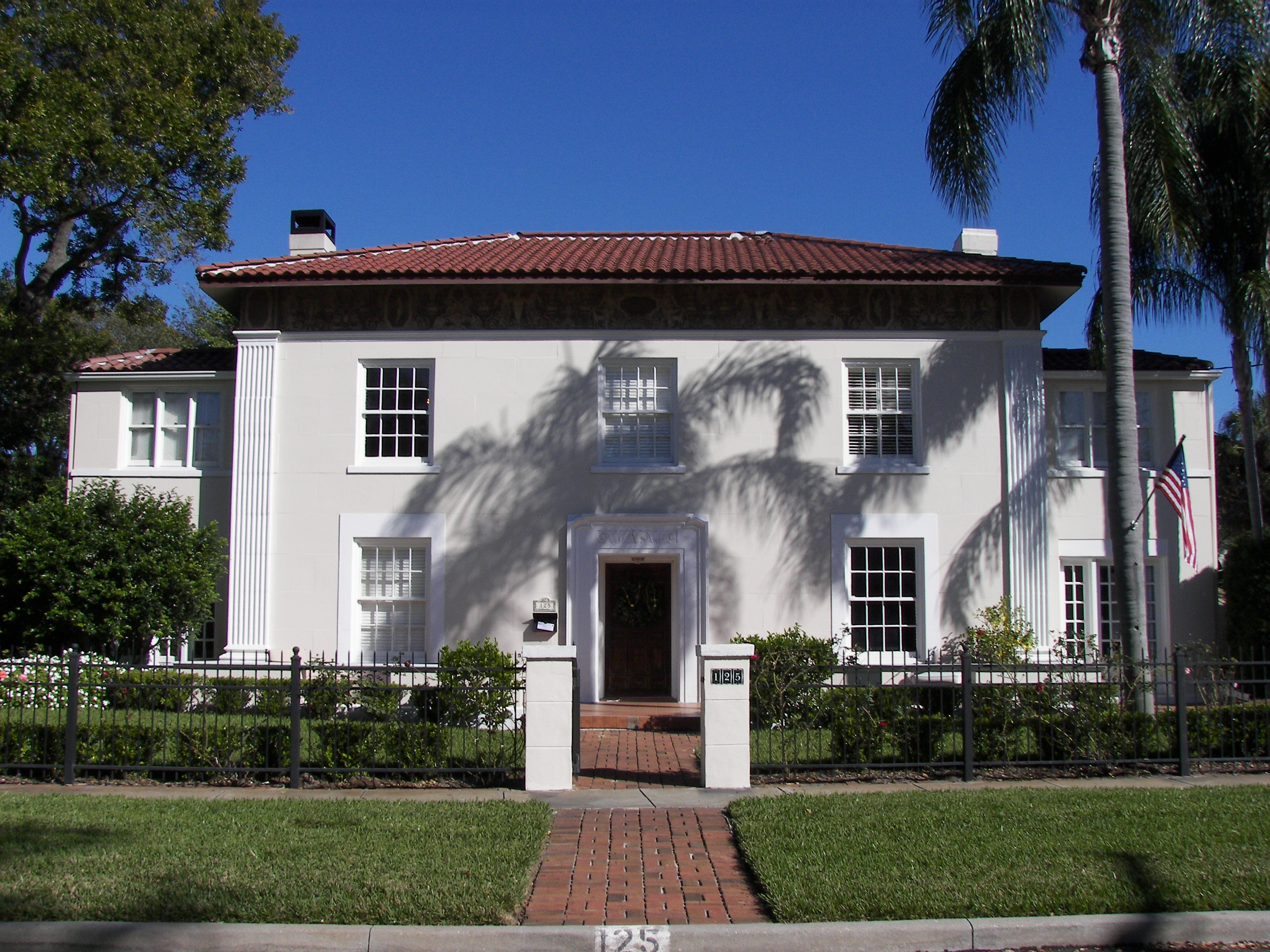

- Location within Florida Location within the United States
- Location: Hillsborough County, Florida, USA
- Nearest city: Tampa, Florida
- Coordinates: 27°55′48″N 82°27′30″W
- Architect: Schumacher & Winkler
- Architectural style: Late 19th And 20th Century Revivals
- MPS: Mediterranean Revival Style Buildings of Davis Islands MPS
- NRHP reference No.: 89000958
- Added to NRHP: August 3, 1989

The House at 125 Baltic Circle is a historic home in the Davis Islands neighborhood of Tampa, Florida, United States. It is located at 125 Baltic Circle. On August 3, 1989, it was added to the U.S. National Register of Historic Places.
