= Spanish Apartments =

- U.S. National Register of Historic Places
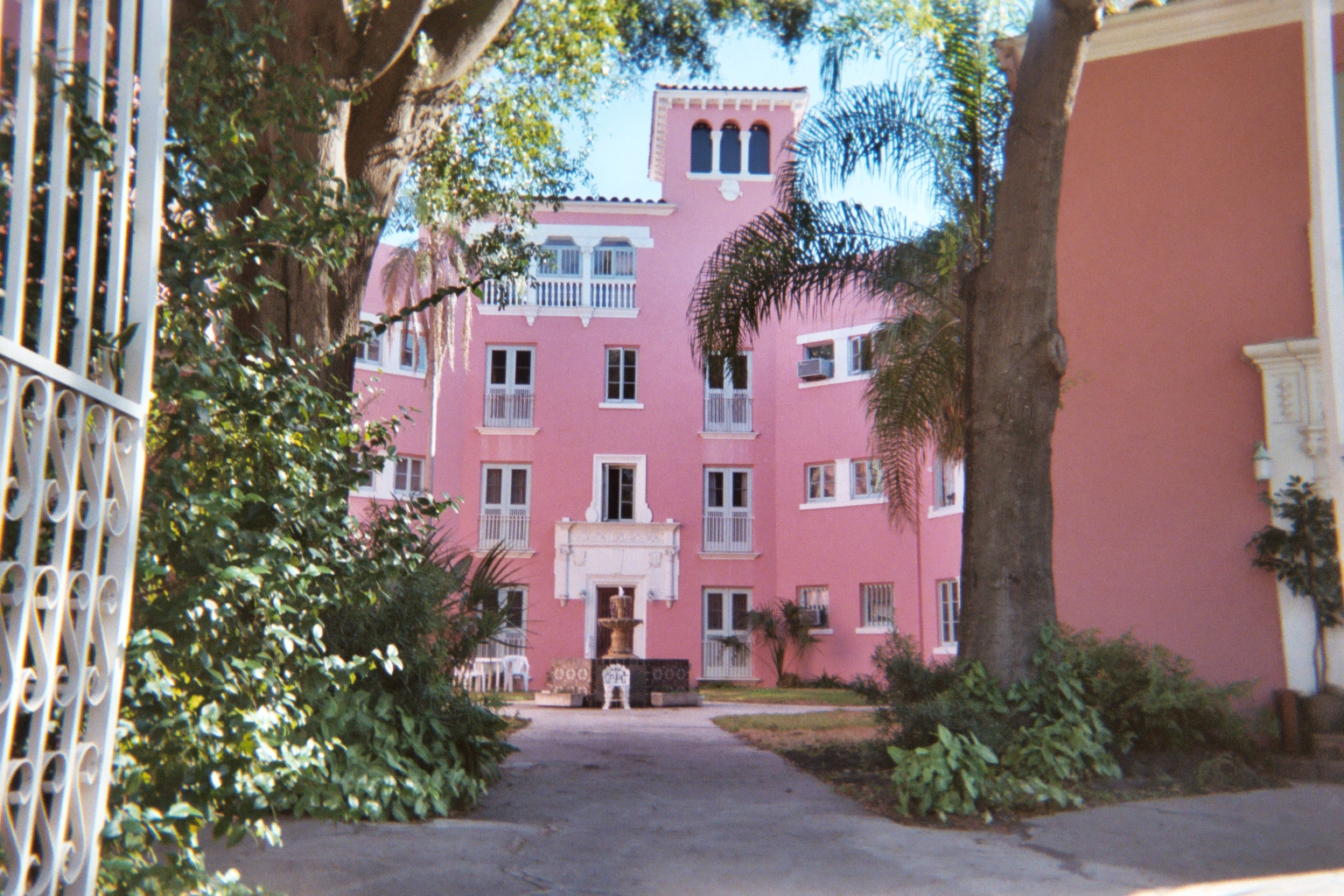
- Courtyard of the Spanish Apartments

- Location within Florida Location within the United States
- Location: 16 E. Davis Blvd., Tampa, Florida
- Coordinates: 27°56′8″N 82°27′35″W
- Area: less than one acre
- Built: 1925
- Architect: Martin L. Hampton, Grayburn H. Cooper
- Architectural style: Late 19th And 20th Century Revivals, Mediterranean Revival
- MPS: Mediterranean Revival Style Buildings of Davis Islands MPS
- NRHP reference No.: 89000968
- Added to NRHP: August 3, 1989

The Spanish Apartments is a historic site in Davis Islands, Tampa, Florida, United States. It was added to the National Register of Historic Places on August 3, 1989.
