= Palace of Florence Apartments =

- U.S. National Register of Historic Places
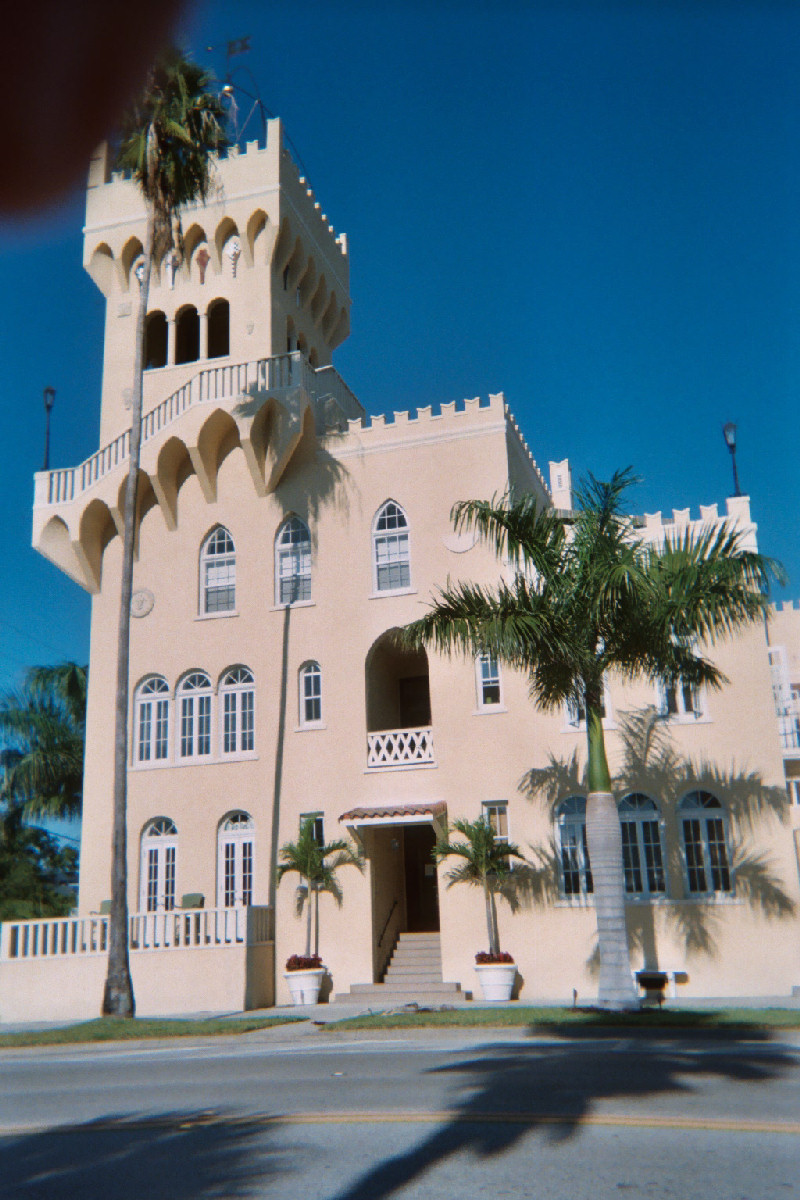
- Palace of Florence Apartments, north end, 2006

- Location within Florida Location within the United States
- Location: 45 E. Davis Blvd., Tampa, Florida
- Coordinates: 27°56′2″N 82°27′28″W
- Area: less than one acre
- Built: 1925
- Architect: Athos Menaboni, et al.
- Architectural style: Mediterranean Revival
- MPS: Mediterranean Revival Style Buildings of Davis Islands MPS
- NRHP reference No.: 89000969
- Added to NRHP: August 3, 1989

The Palace of Florence Apartments is a historic structure in Tampa, Florida, USA. The 28-unit apartment building is located on Tampa's Davis Islands at 45 Davis Boulevard.

== Architecture ==
Construction on The Palace of Florence began in 1925. Its Mediterranean Revival architecture mixes medieval and classical elements to reproduce the look of a grand scale Italian palazzo, and includes a dramatic four-story battlement tower with exterior staircase. The design, by artist Athos Menaboni, is loosely based on that of the Palazzo Vecchio in Florence, Italy., hence the building's name.

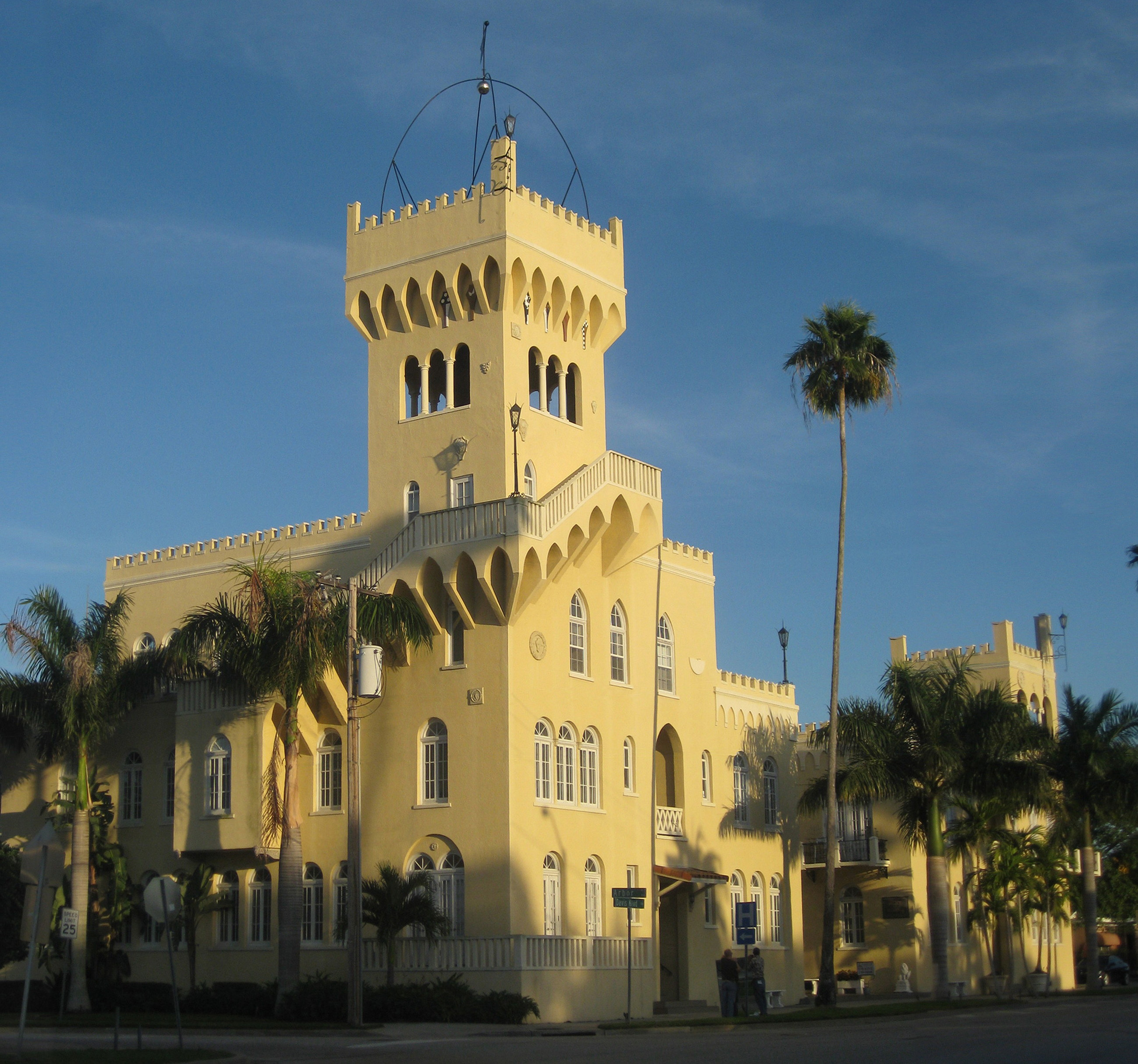
Palace of Florence Apartments, 2009

== Historic Status ==
On August 3, 1989, The Palace of Florence Apartments were among several Davis Islands properties included in a Multiple Property Submission(or MPS) to be listed with the U.S. National Register of Historic Places. The MPS, named "Mediterranean Revival Style Buildings of Davis Islands", included a total of twenty-three historic structures, which were among the first ever built on the newly accessible Davis Islands during the Florida land boom of the 1920s.

The Palace of Florence Apartments underwent a complete restoration between 2002-2003.
