= House at 36 Columbia Drive =

Historic house in Florida, United States

- U.S. National Register of Historic Places
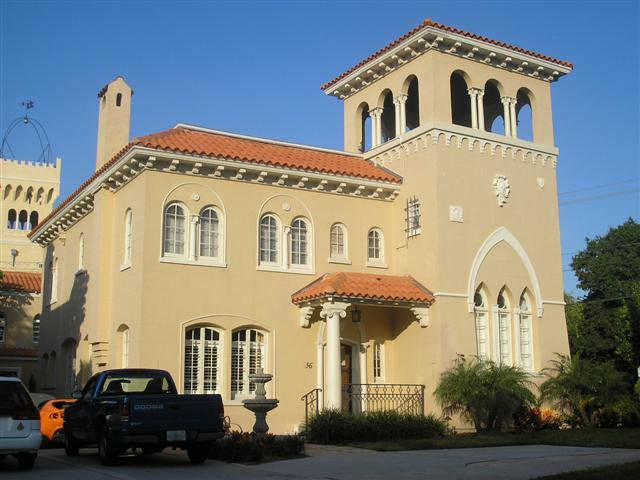

- Location within Florida Location within the United States
- Location: Tampa, Florida
- Coordinates: 27°56′5″N 82°27′26″W
- Built: 1925
- Architect: Hampton, Martin L.
- Architectural style: Late 19th And 20th Century Revivals, Mediterranean Revival
- MPS: Mediterranean Revival Style Buildings of Davis Islands MPS
- NRHP reference No.: 89000966
- Added to NRHP: August 3, 1989

The House at 36 Columbia Drive is a historic home in Tampa, Florida at 36 Columbia Drive on Davis Islands. It was built by Herbert Draper, a successful realtor during the Florida land boom, in 1926, and is an L-shaped hacienda with a three-story open campanile and transom windows. On August 3, 1989, it was added to the U.S. National Register of Historic Places.

== References and external links ==
- Hillsborough County listings at National Register of Historic Places

== Gallery ==
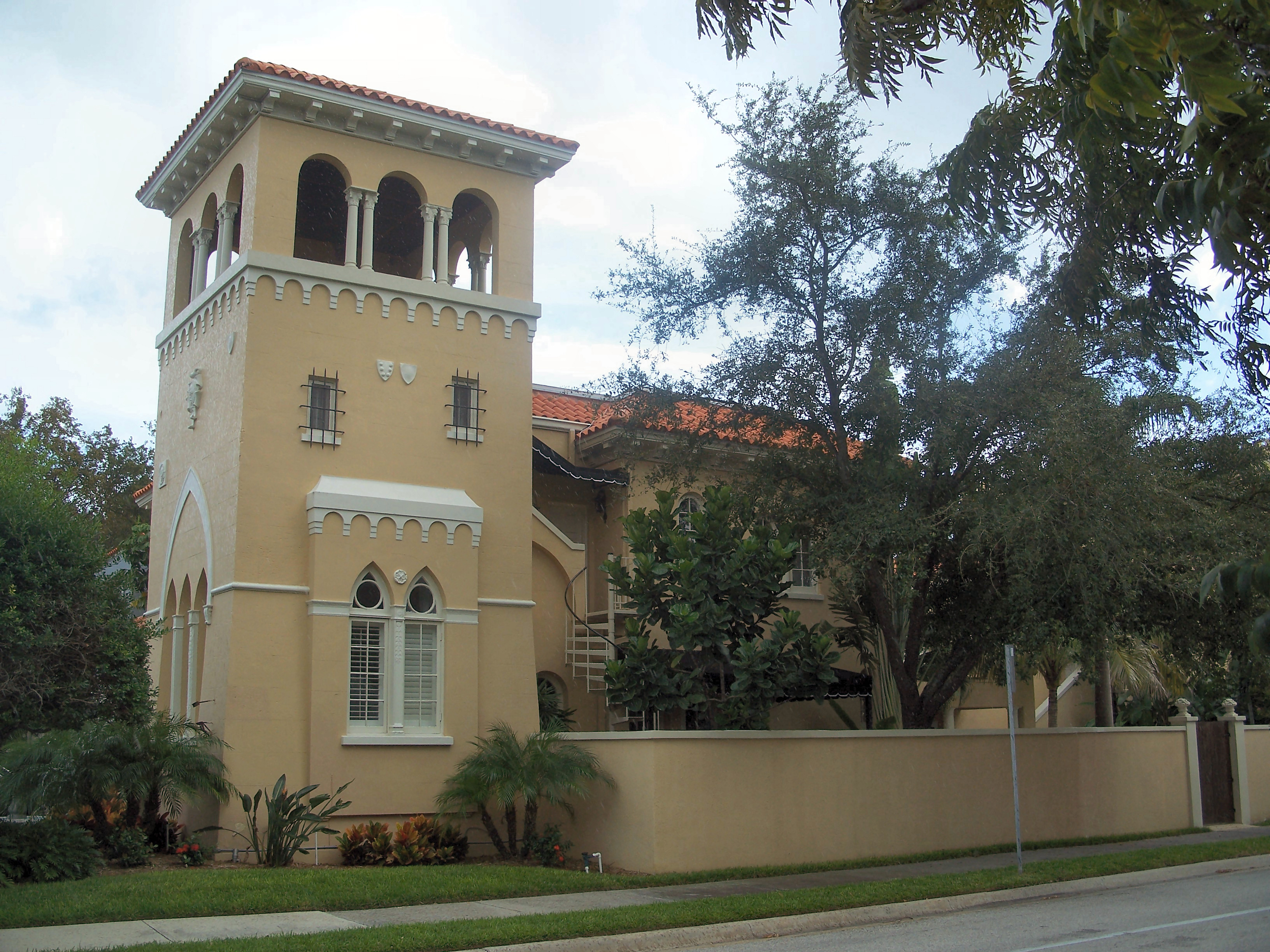

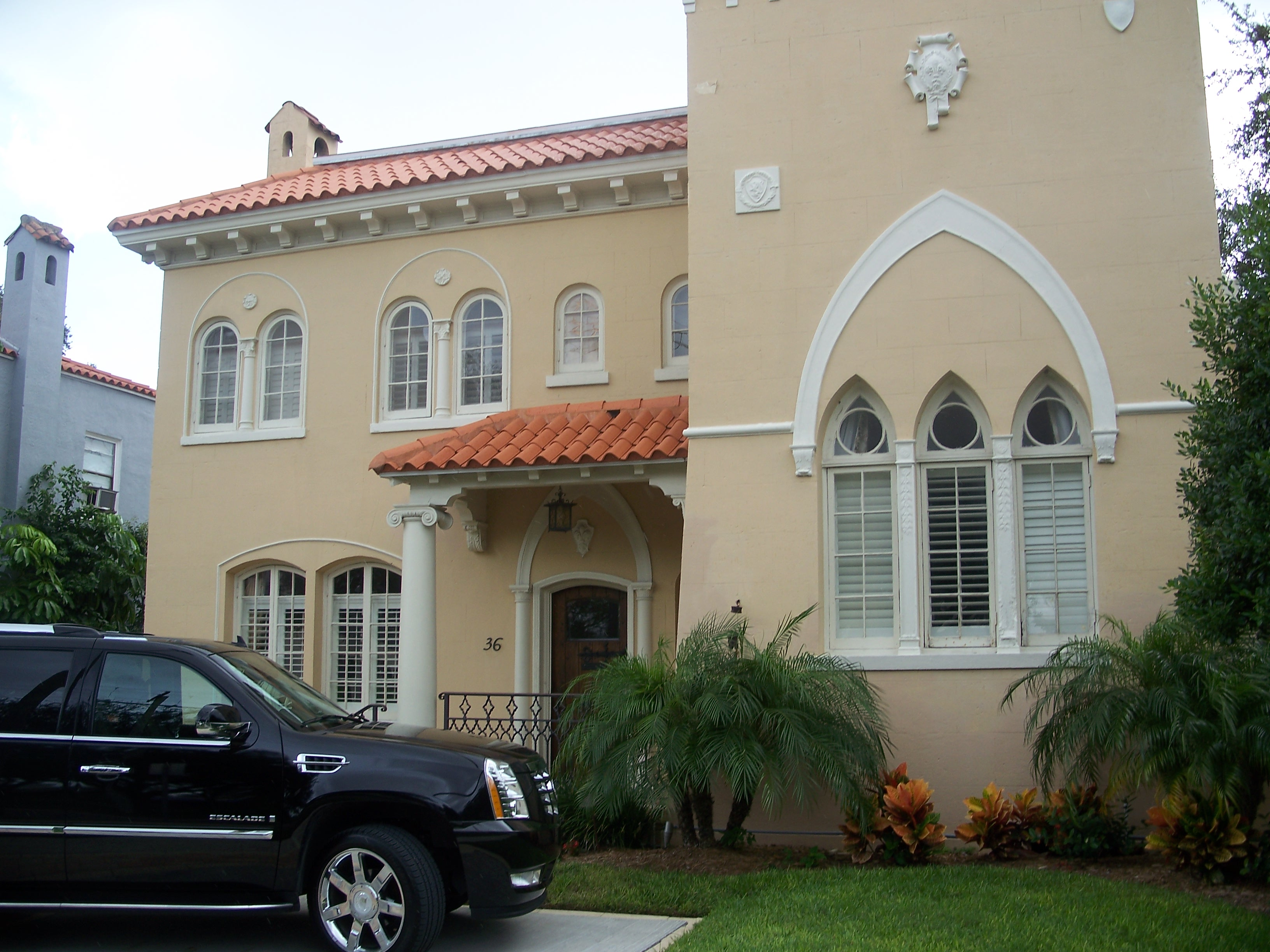

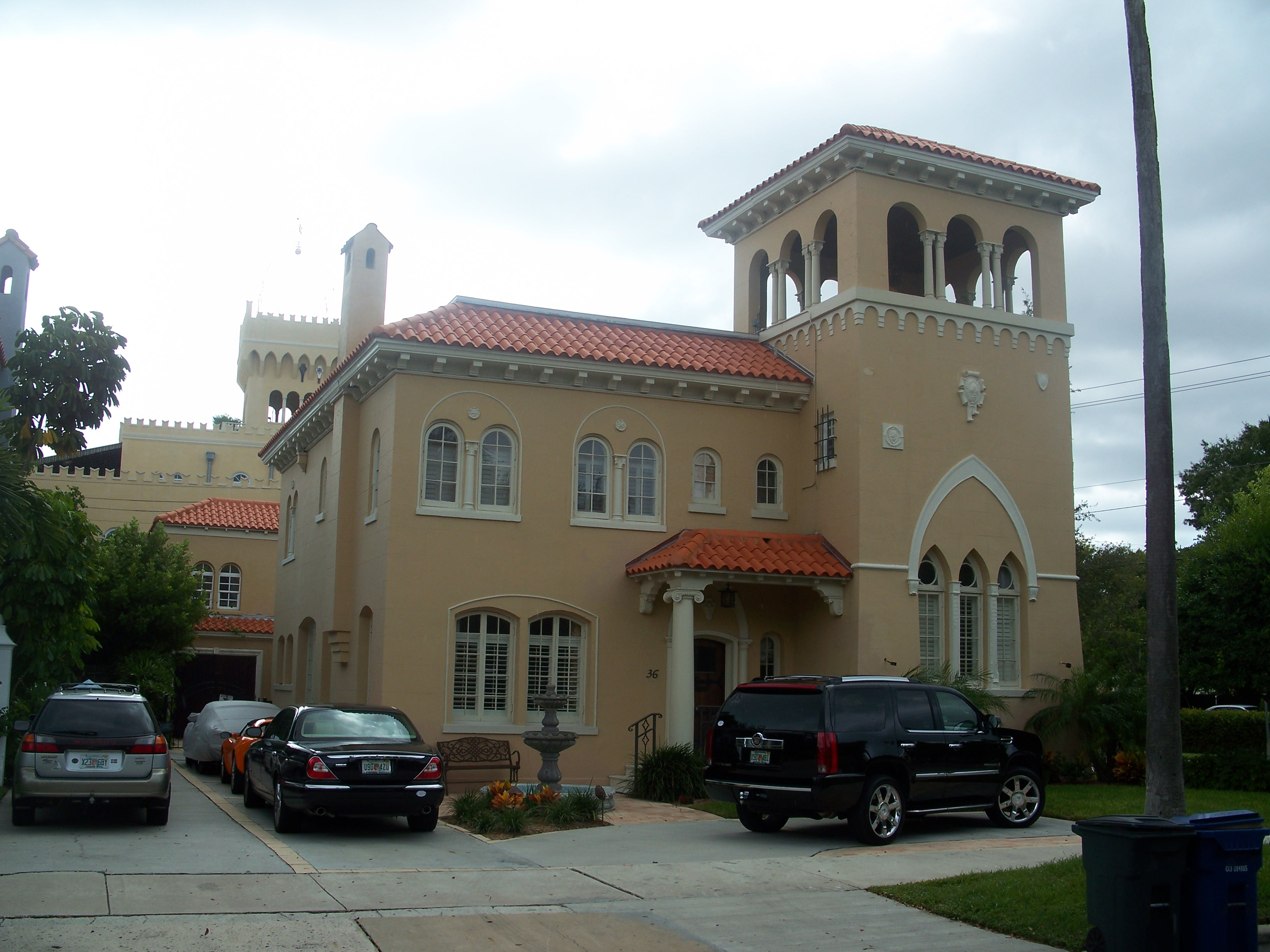
