= House at 84 Adalia Avenue =

Historic house in Florida, United States

- U.S. National Register of Historic Places
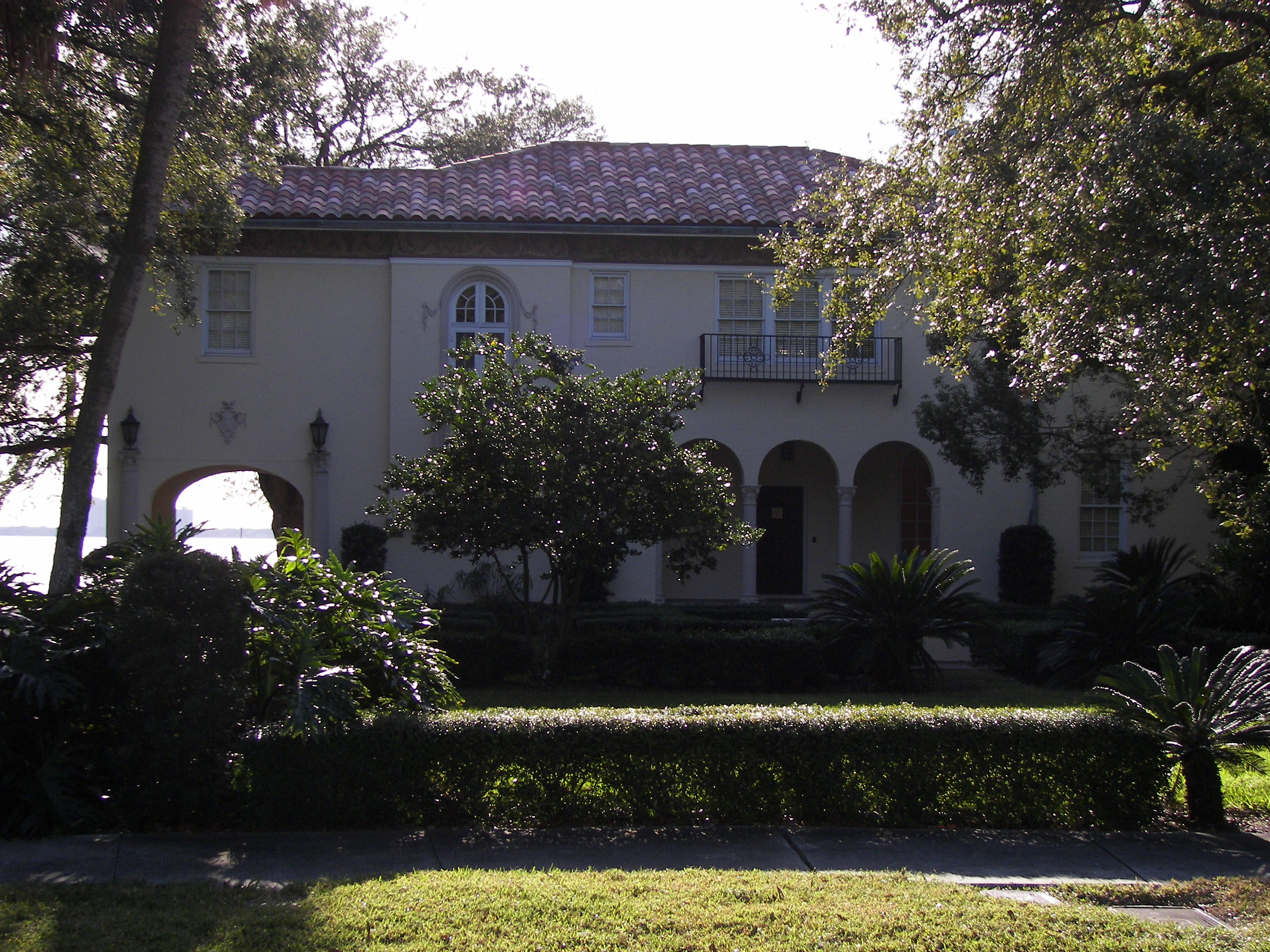
- Location: Hillsborough County, Florida, USA
- Nearest city: Tampa, Florida
- Coordinates: 27°55′51.5″N 82°27′39″W
- Built: 1928
- Architect: Schumacher & Winkler; E. M. Scott
- Architectural style: Late 19th And 20th Century Revivals, Mediterranean Revival
- MPS: Mediterranean Revival Style Buildings of Davis Islands MPS
- NRHP reference No.: 89000953
- Added to NRHP: August 3, 1989

The House at 84 Adalia Avenue is a historic home in the Davis Islands neighborhood of Tampa, Florida, United States. It is located at 84 Adalia Avenue. On August 3, 1989, it was added to the U.S. National Register of Historic Places.

In July 2015, the home was sold for $3.3 million. It was reported to be in "horrible disrepair" and was removed from the Register. The new owners will demolish the home and build a new one at the same location.

== References and external links ==
- Hillsborough County listings at National Register of Historic Places
