= House at 161 Bosporous Avenue =

Historic house in Florida, United States

- U.S. National Register of Historic Places
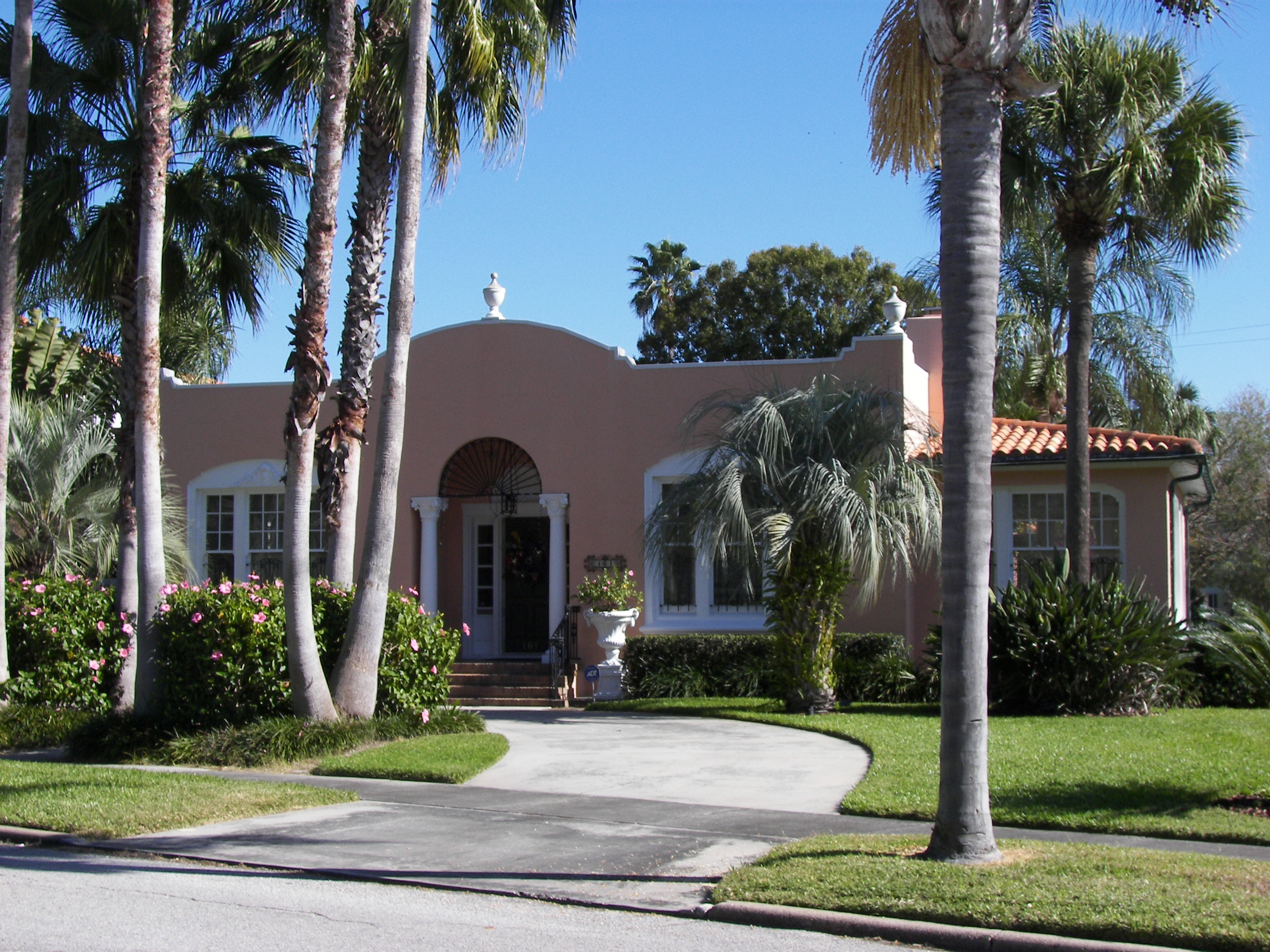

- Location within Florida Location within the United States
- Location: Hillsborough County, Florida, USA
- Nearest city: Tampa, Florida
- Coordinates: 27°55′33″N 82°27′26″W
- Architect: E. M. Scott, Frank Winn
- Architectural style: Mission/Spanish Revival
- MPS: Mediterranean Revival Style Buildings of Davis Islands MPS
- NRHP reference No.: 89000963
- Added to NRHP: August 3, 1989

The House at 161 Bosporous Avenue is a historic home in the Davis Islands neighborhood of Tampa, Florida, United States. It is located at 161 Bosporous Avenue. On August 3, 1989, it was added to the U.S. National Register of Historic Places.
