= House at 36 Aegean Avenue =

Historic house in Florida, United States

- U.S. National Register of Historic Places
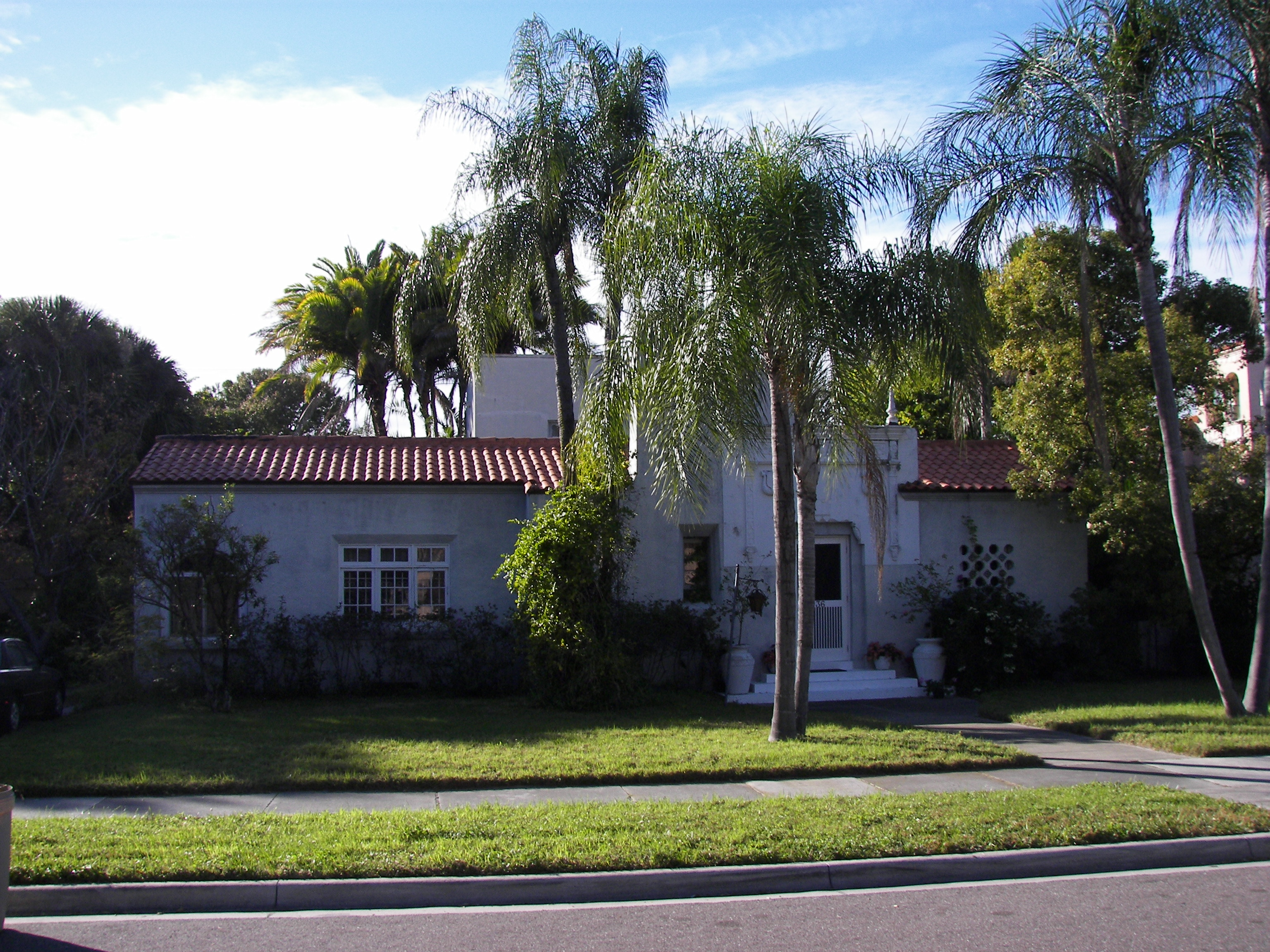

- Location within Florida Location within the United States
- Location: Hillsborough County, Florida, USA
- Nearest city: Tampa, Florida
- Coordinates: 27°56′4″N 82°27′34″W
- Built: 1925
- Architect: Martin L. Hampton; Logan Brothers Construction Co.
- Architectural style: Late 19th And 20th Century Revivals, Mediterranean Revival
- MPS: Mediterranean Revival Style Buildings of Davis Islands MPS
- NRHP reference No.: 89001964
- Added to NRHP: November 13, 1989

The House at 36 Aegean Avenue is a historic home in the Davis Islands neighborhood of Tampa, Florida, United States. It is located at 36 Aegean Avenue. On November 13, 1989, it was added to the U.S. National Register of Historic Places.

== References and external links ==
- Hillsborough County listings at National Register of Historic Places
