= House at 202 Blanca Avenue =

Historic house in Florida, United States

- U.S. National Register of Historic Places
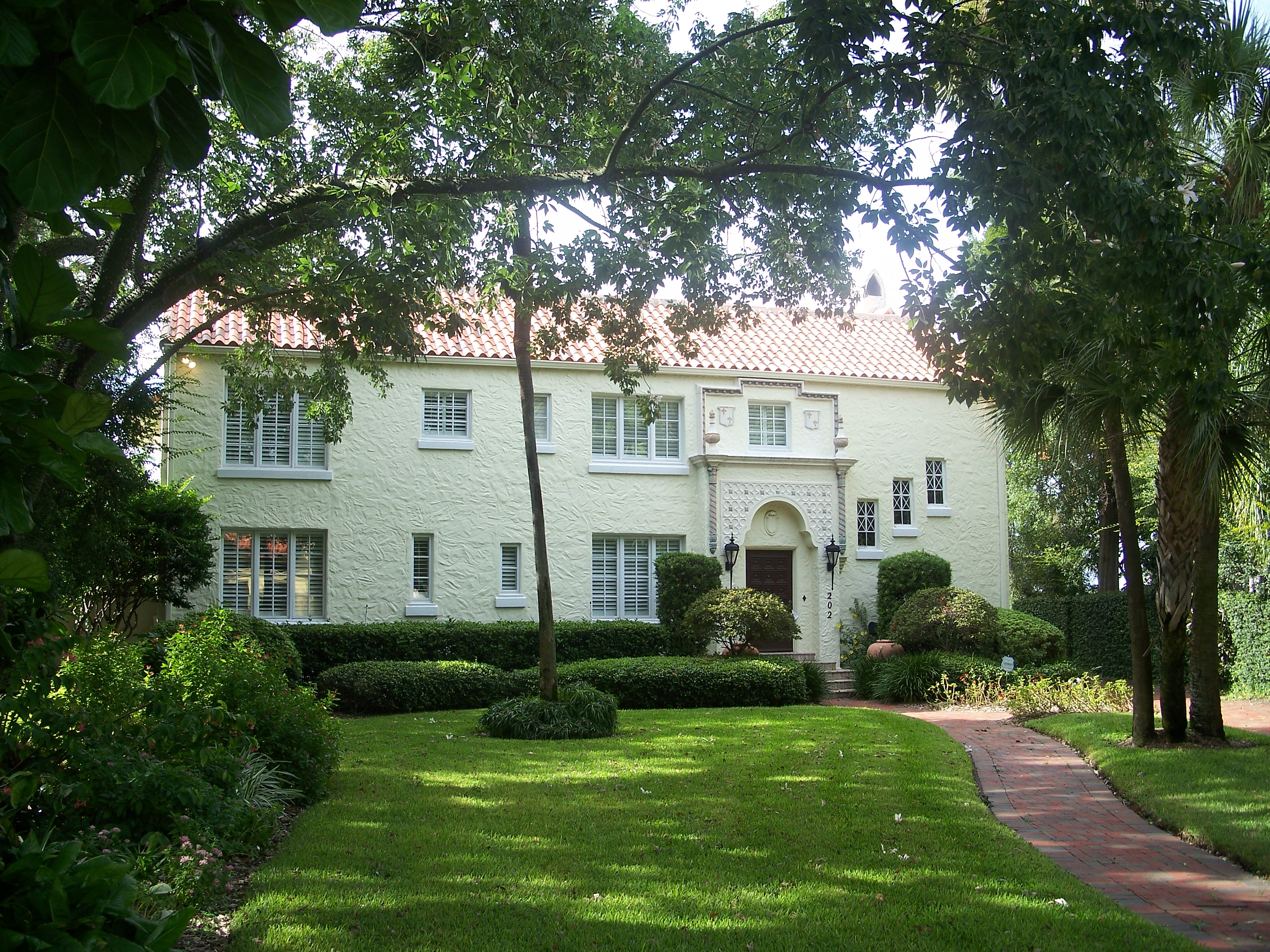

- Location within Florida Location within the United States
- Location: Tampa, Florida
- Coordinates: 27°55′36″N 82°27′42″W
- Built: 1926
- Architect: Schumacher & Winkler
- Architectural style: Late 19th And 20th Century Revivals, Mediterranean Revival
- MPS: Mediterranean Revival Style Buildings of Davis Islands MPS
- NRHP reference No.: 89000960
- Added to NRHP: August 3, 1989

The House at 202 Blanca Avenue is a historic home in Tampa, Florida. It is located at 202 Blanca Avenue. On August 3, 1989, it was added to the U.S. National Register of Historic Places.

House was torn down in January 2022. It is now a vacant lot.

== References and external links ==
- Hillsborough County listings at National Register of Historic Places

== Gallery ==
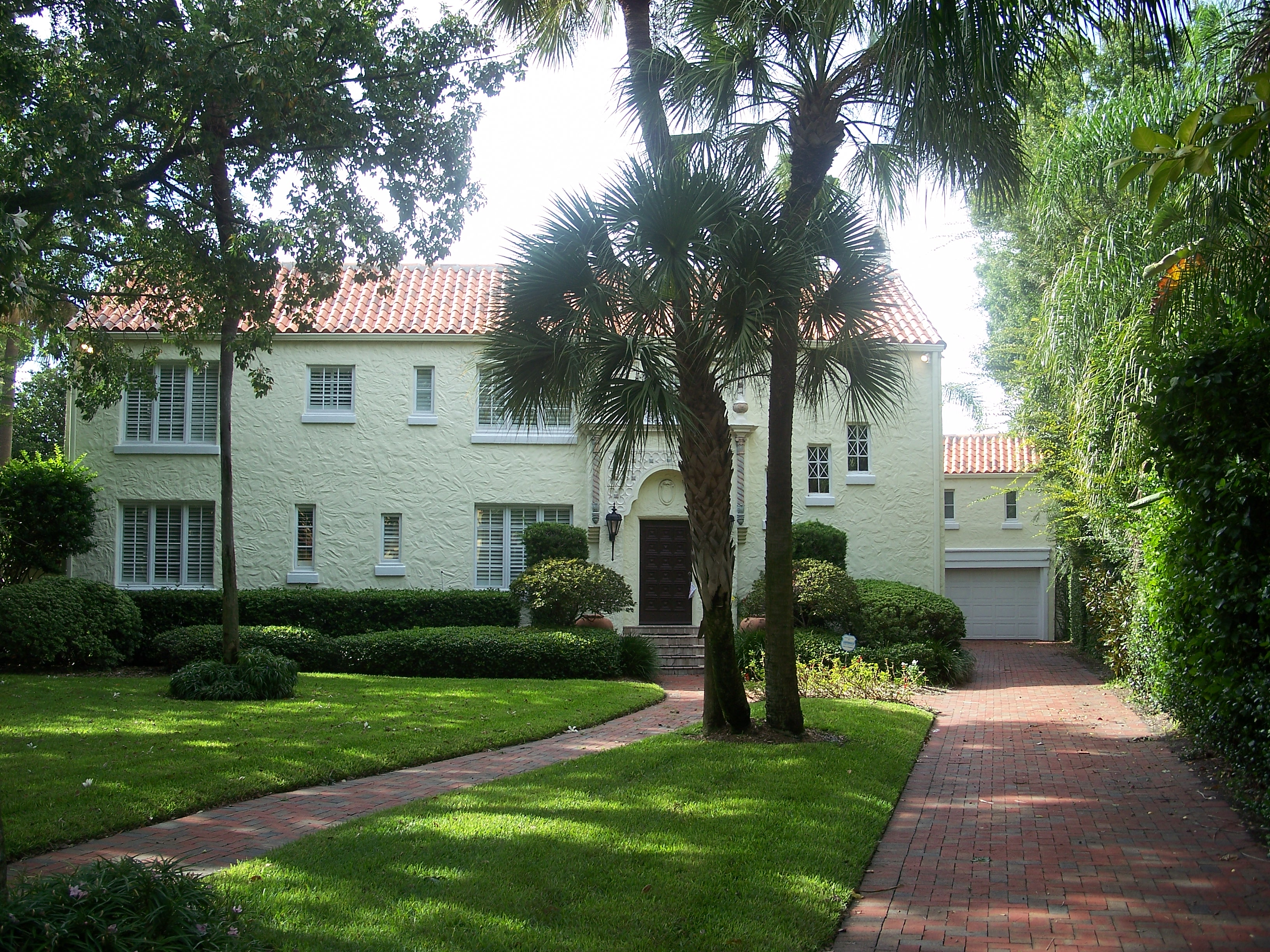
