= House at 220 Blanca Avenue =

Historic house in Florida, United States

- U.S. National Register of Historic Places
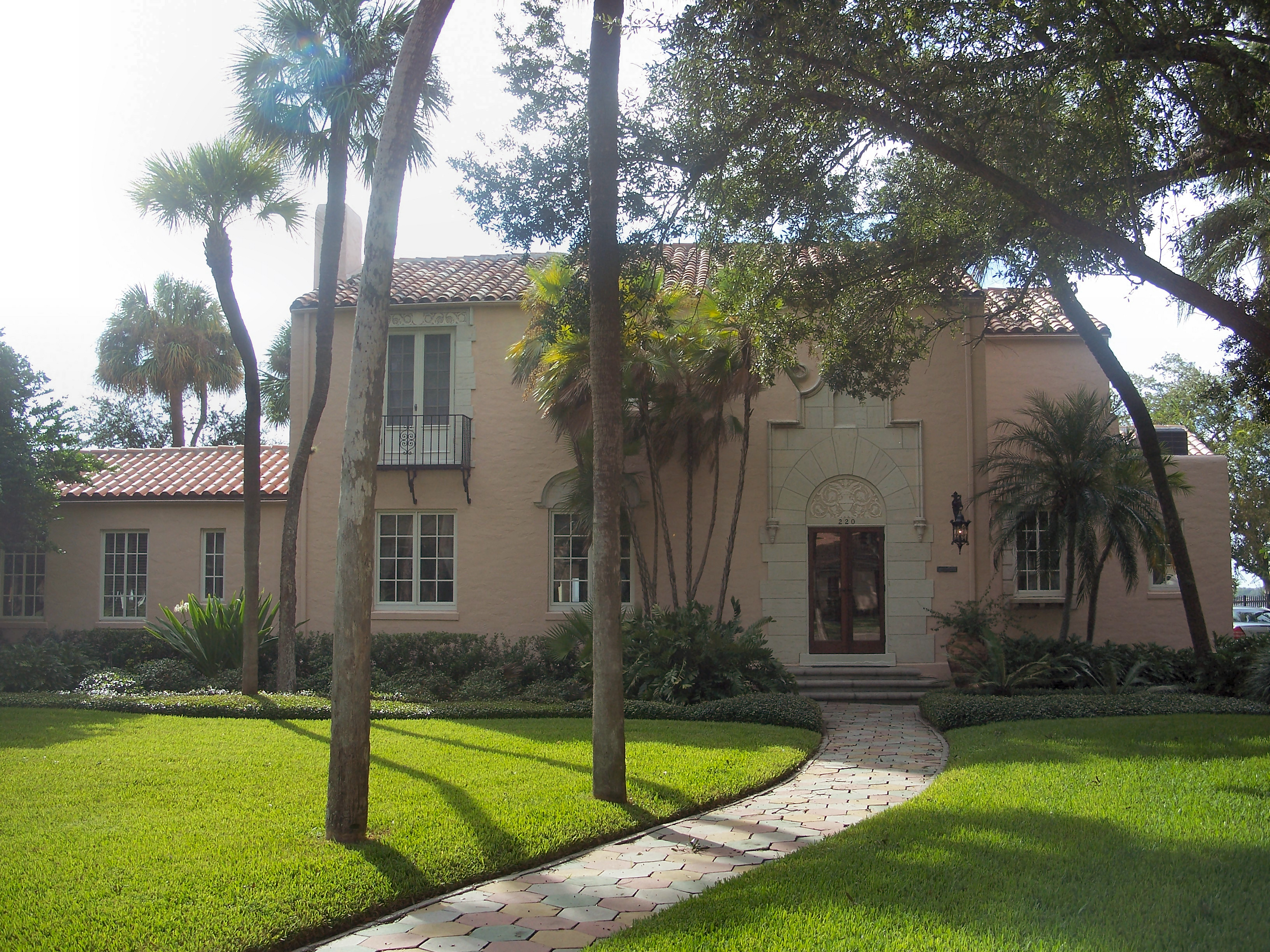

- Location within Florida Location within the United States
- Location: Tampa, Florida
- Coordinates: 27°55′31″N 82°27′39″W
- Built: 1927
- Architect: Schumacher & Winkler
- Architectural style: Late 19th And 20th Century Revivals, Mediterranean Revival
- MPS: Mediterranean Revival Style Buildings of Davis Islands MPS
- NRHP reference No.: 89000961
- Added to NRHP: August 3, 1989

The House at 220 Blanca Avenue is a historic home in Tampa, Florida. It is located at 220 Blanca Avenue. On August 3, 1989, it was added to the U.S. National Register of Historic Places.

== Gallery ==
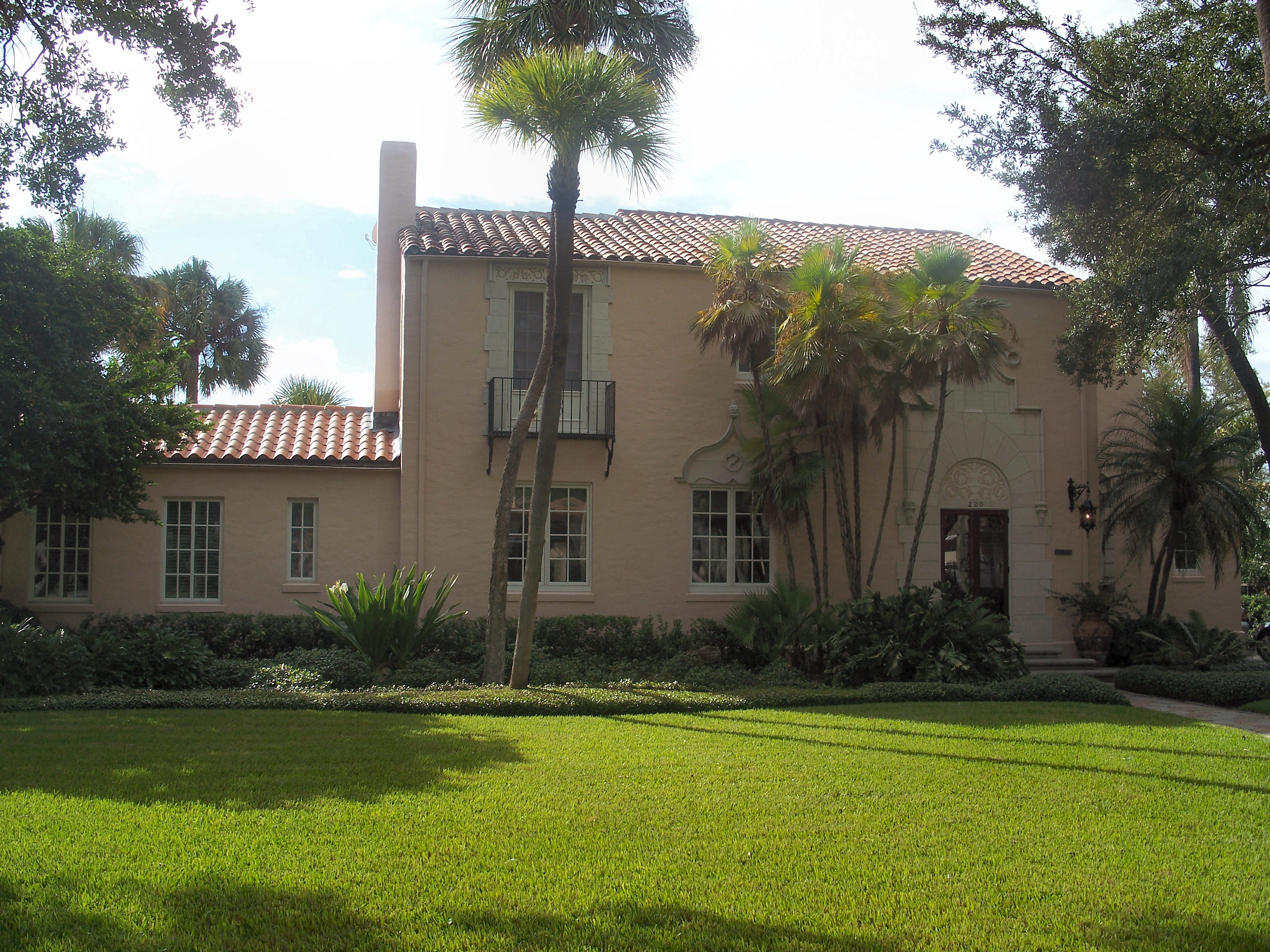

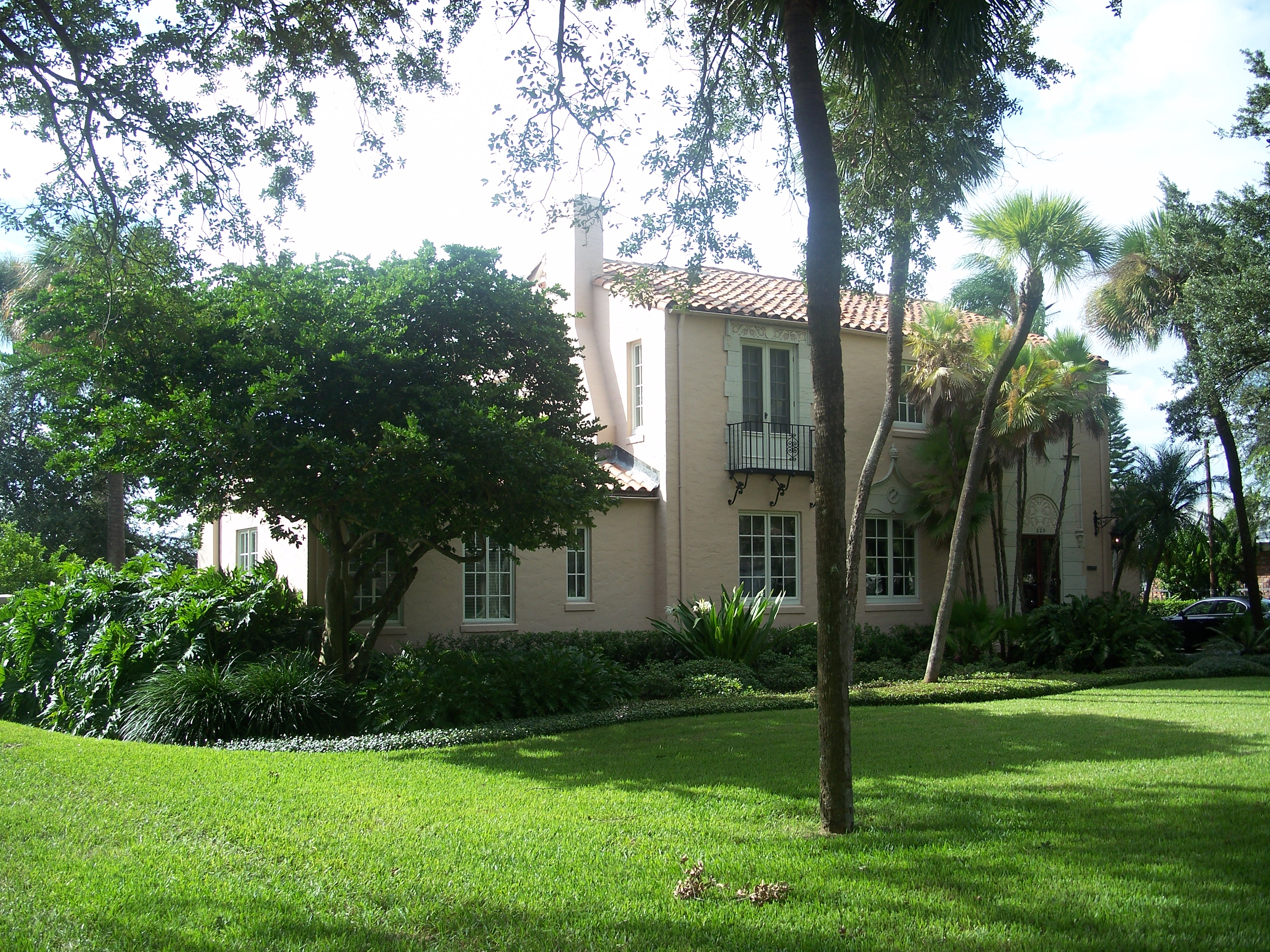
