= Tampania House =

Historic house in Florida, United States

- U.S. National Register of Historic Places
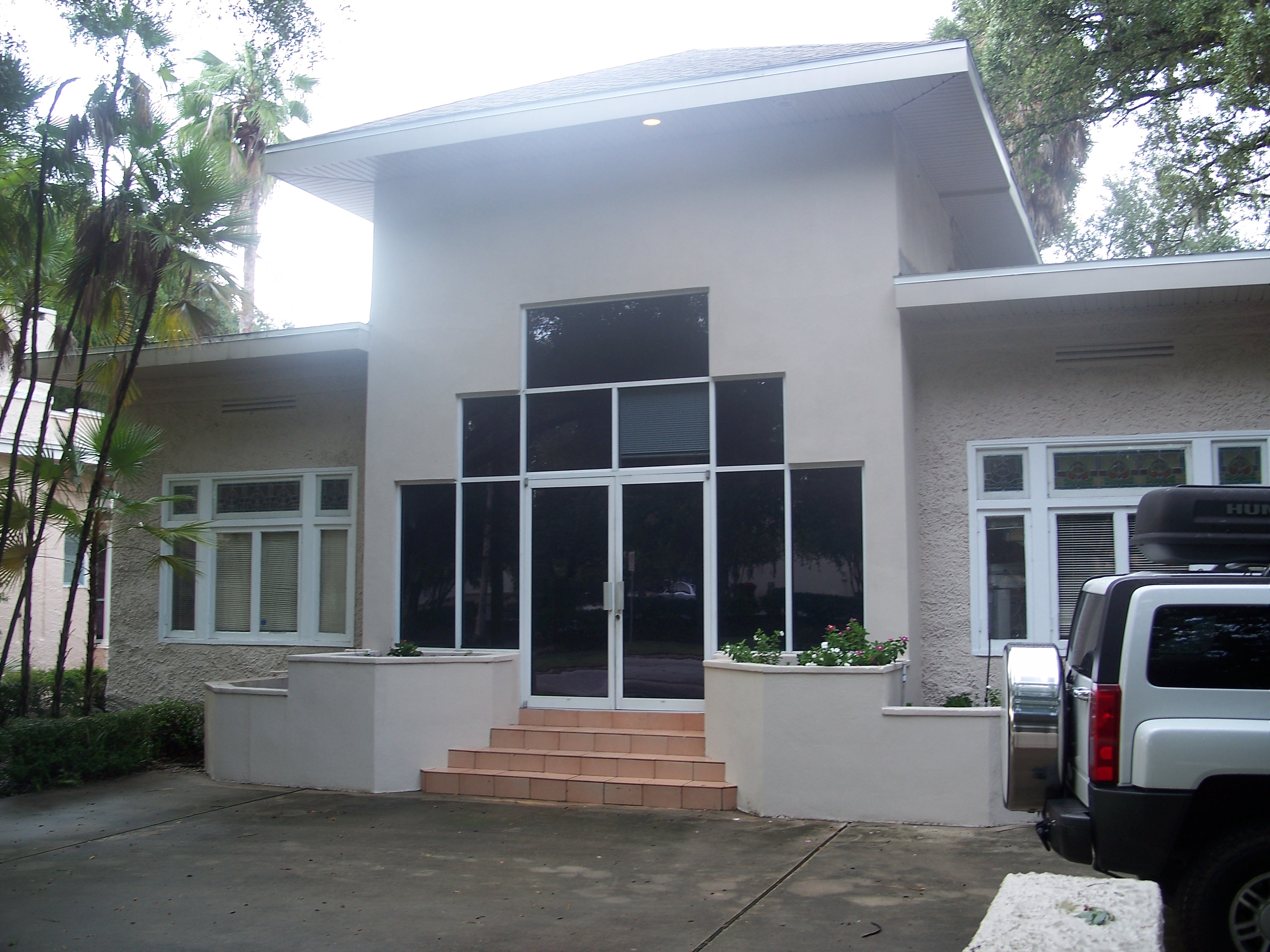

- Location within Florida Location within the United States
- Location: 4611 N. A St., Tampa, Florida
- Coordinates: 27°56′45″N 82°30′19″W
- Area: less than one acre
- Built: 1927
- Architectural style: Prairie School
- NRHP reference No.: 85002178
- Added to NRHP: September 12, 1985

The Tampania House (also known as the Friederich House or Kirkeby House) is a historic home in Tampa, Florida. It is located at 4611 North A Street. On September 12, 1985, it was added to the U.S. National Register of Historic Places.

== References and external links ==
- Hillsborough County listings at National Register of Historic Places
- Florida's Office of Cultural and Historical Programs
  - Hillsborough County listings
  - Tampania House

== Gallery ==
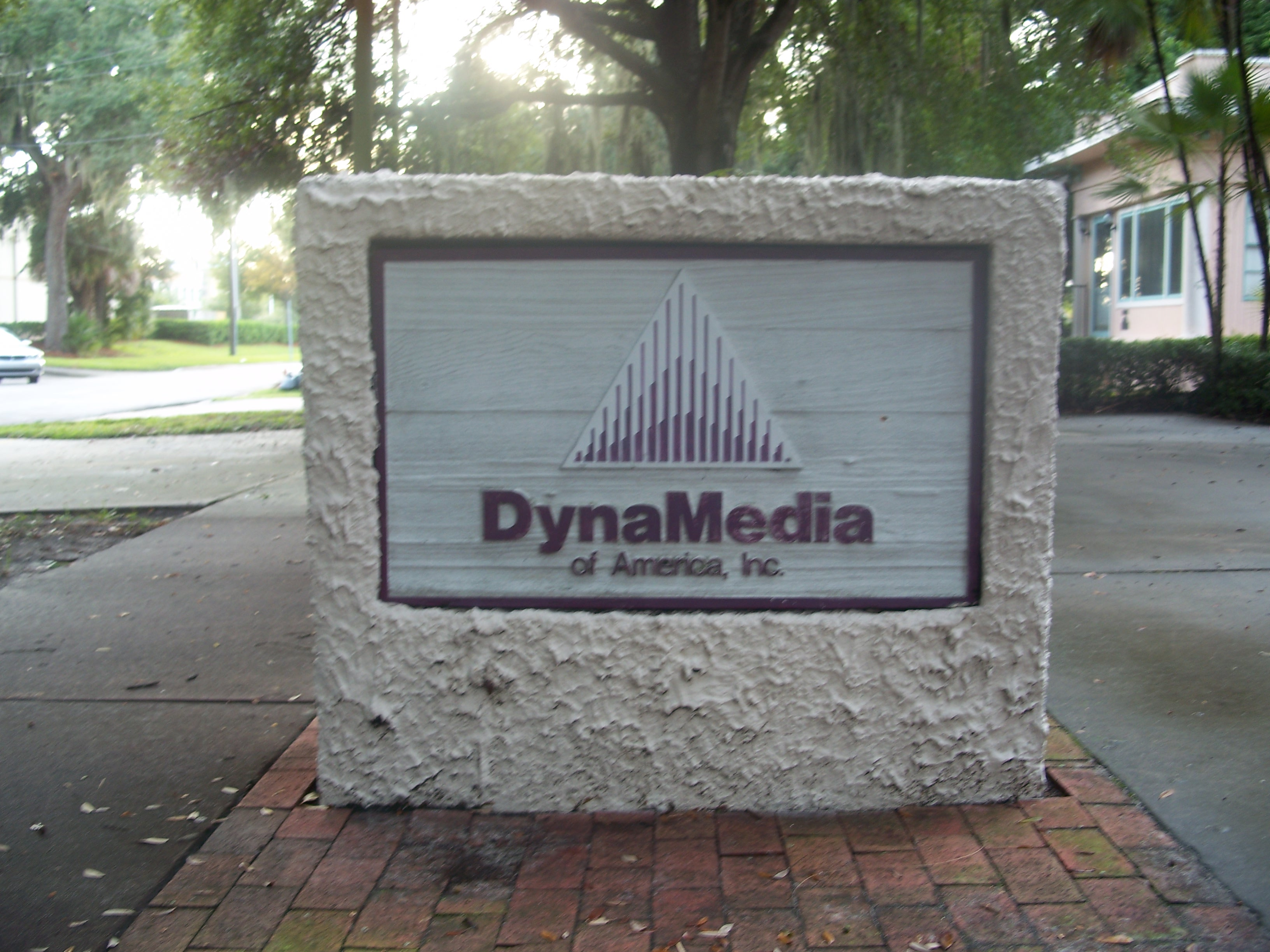

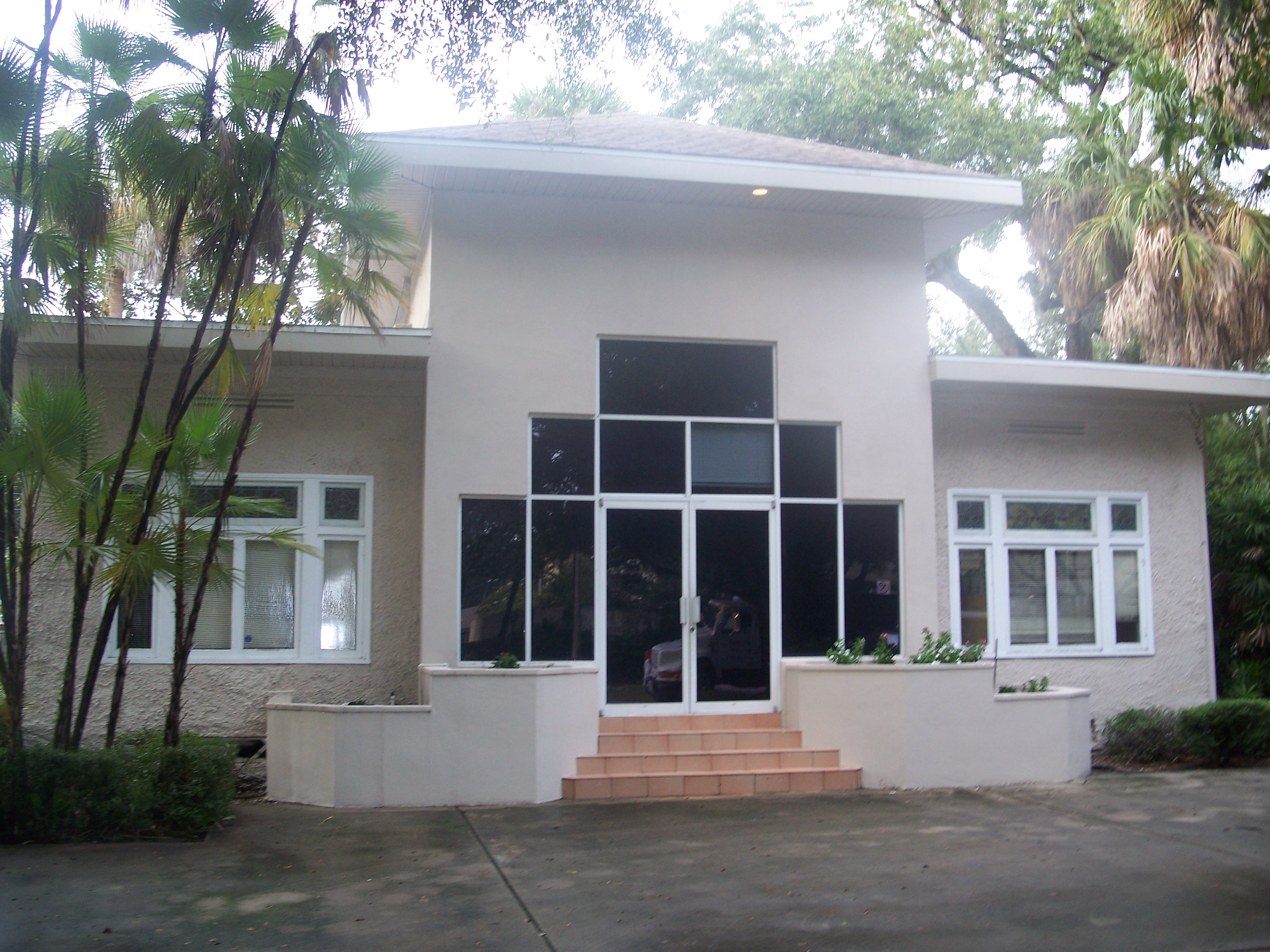

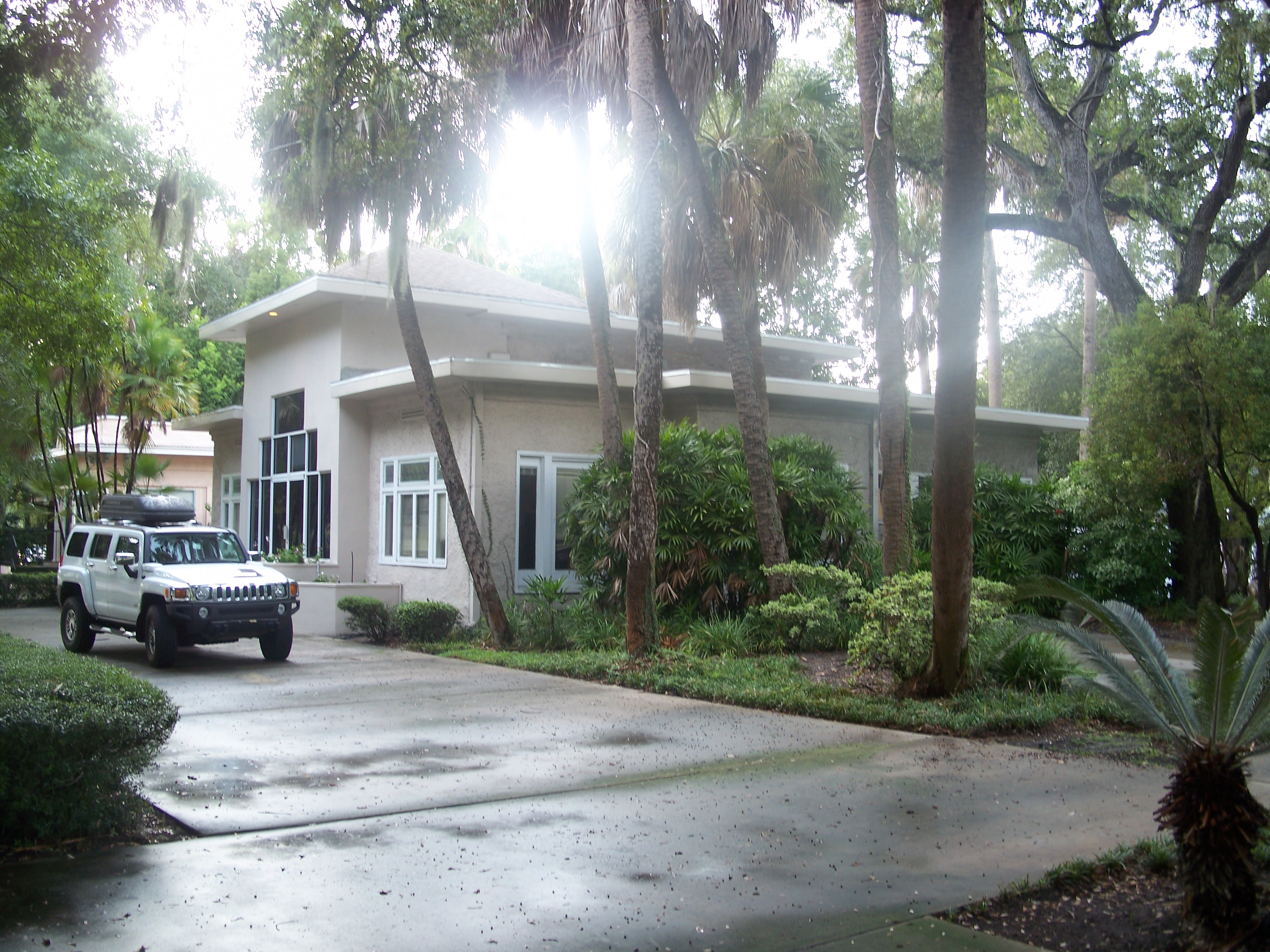
