= House at 200 Corsica Avenue =

Historic house in Florida, United States

- U.S. National Register of Historic Places
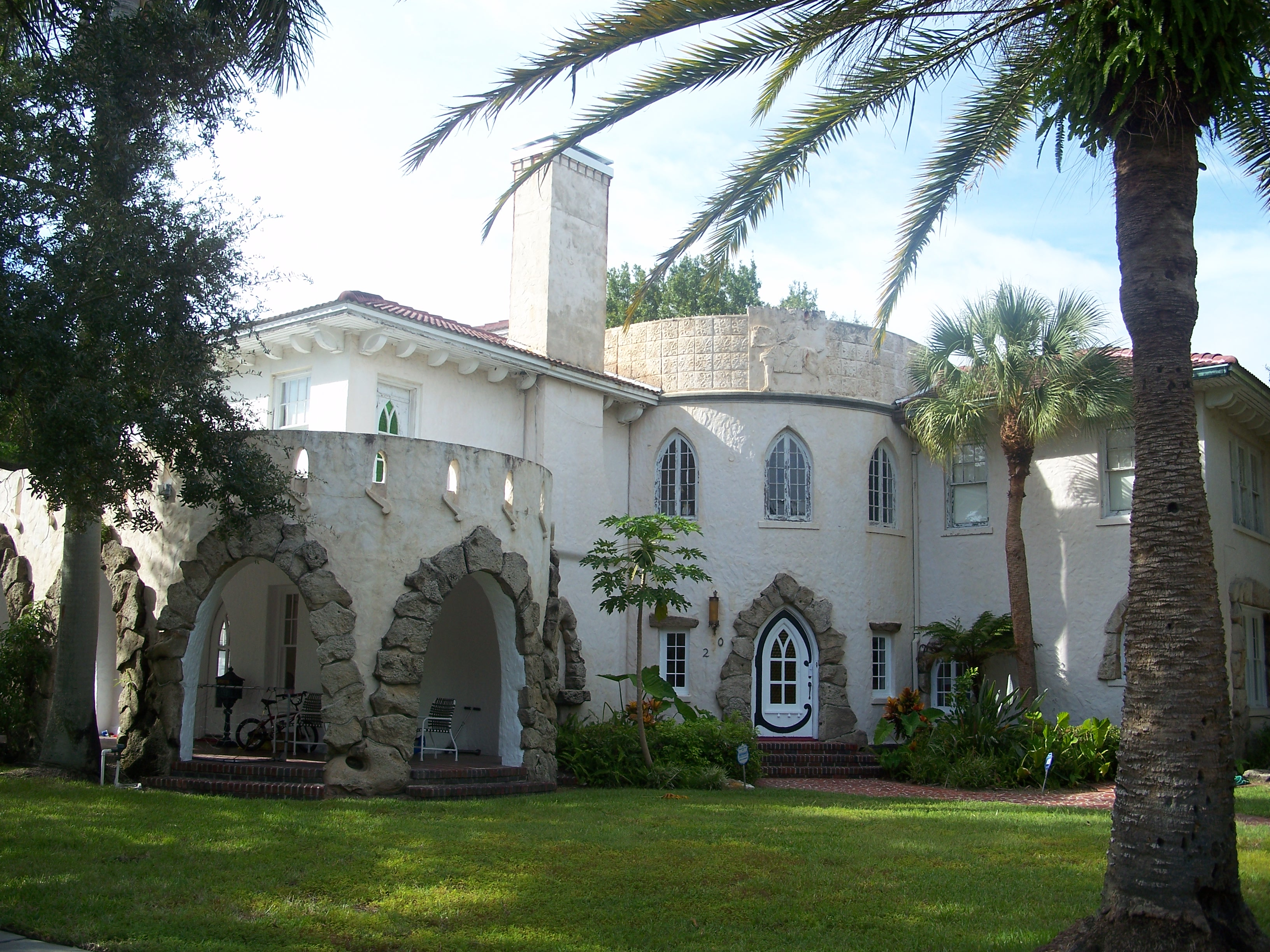

- Location within Florida Location within the United States
- Location: Tampa, Florida
- Coordinates: 27°44′31″N 82°27′38″W
- Architect: Schumacher & Winkler
- Architectural style: Mission/Spanish Revival
- MPS: Mediterranean Revival Style Buildings of Davis Islands MPS
- NRHP reference No.: 89000967
- Added to NRHP: August 3, 1989

The House at 200 Corsica Avenue is a historic home in Tampa, Florida. On August 3, 1989, it was added to the U.S. National Register of Historic Places.

== Gallery ==
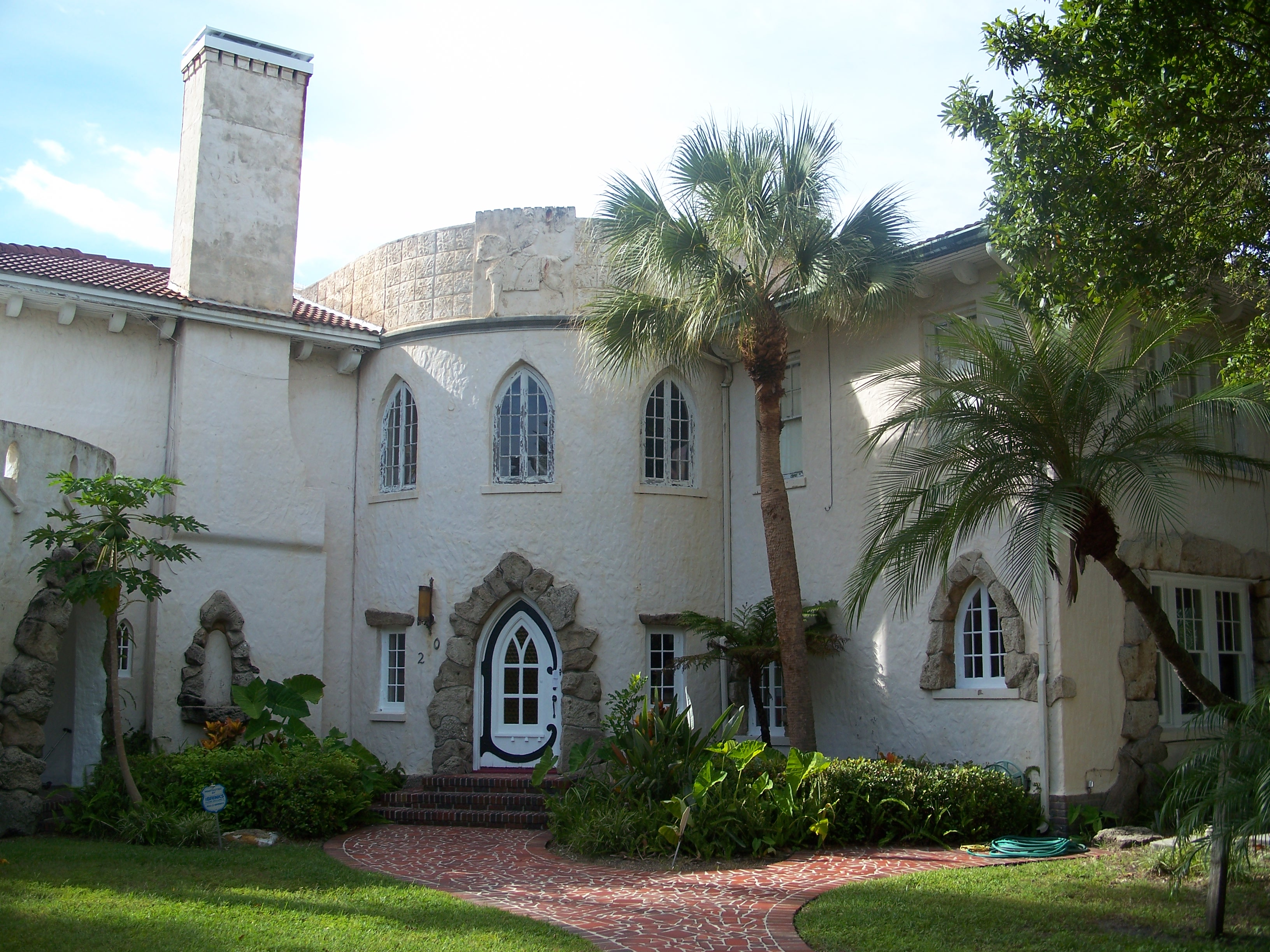

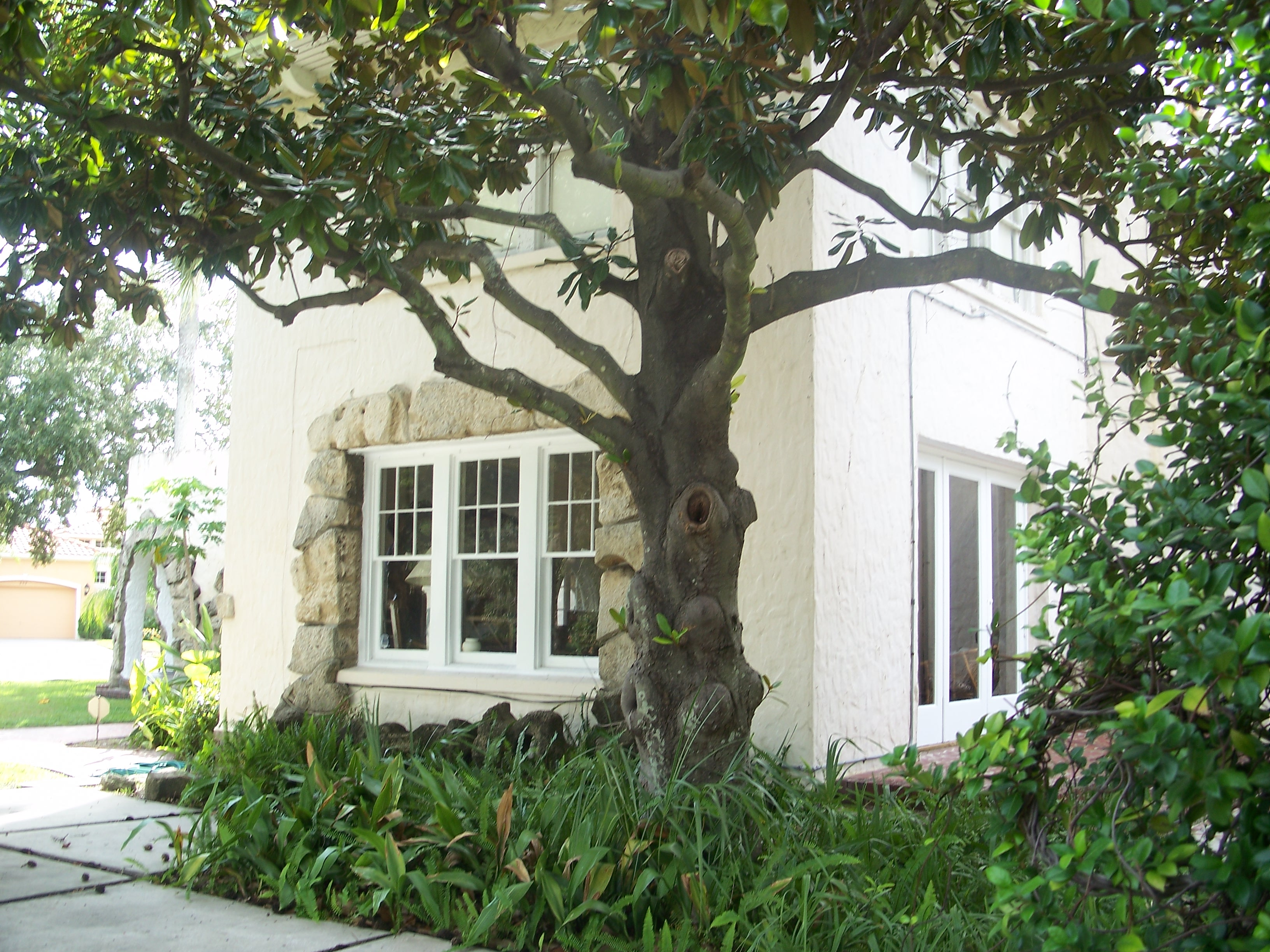

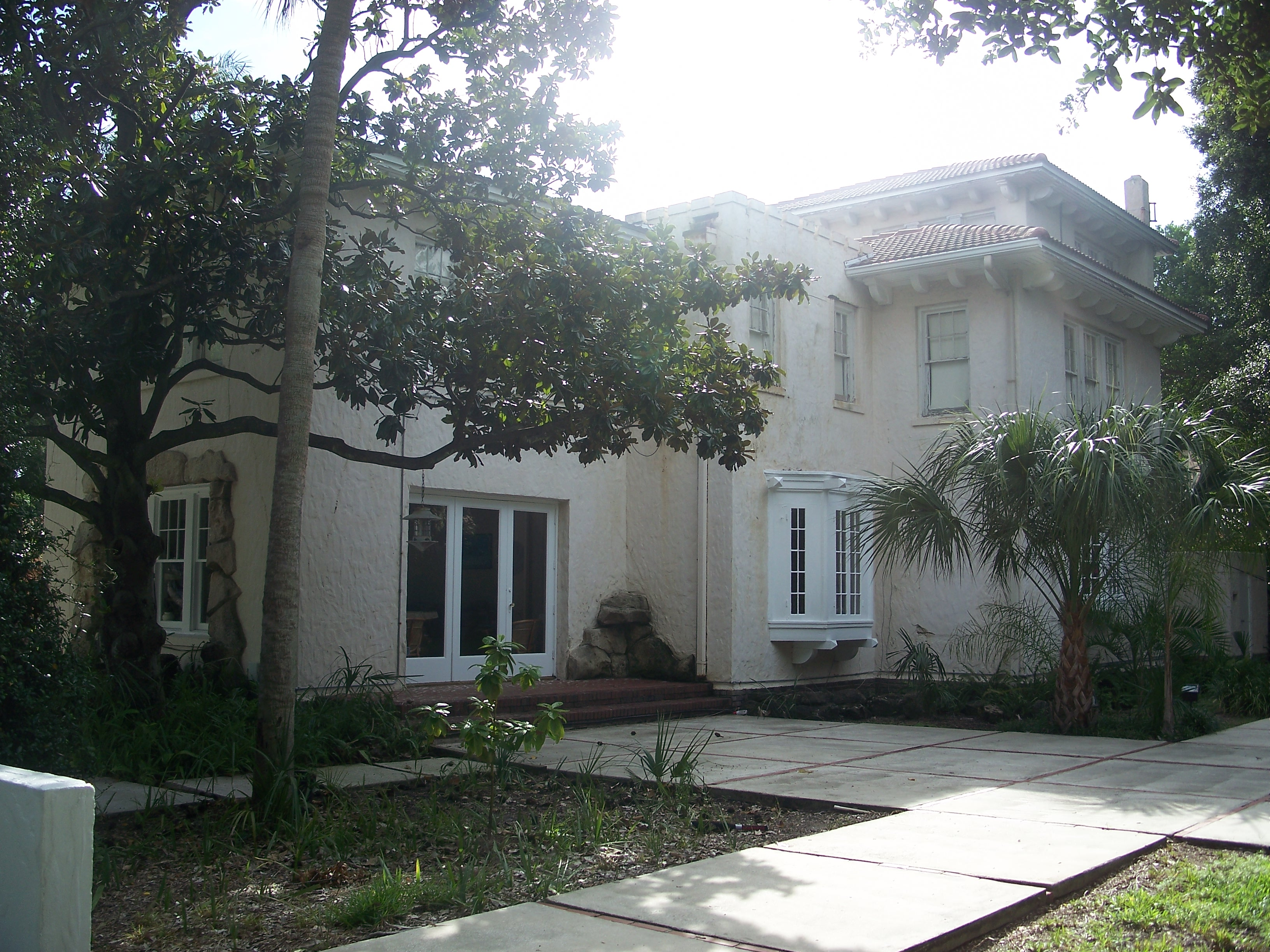
