= House at 418 Blanca Avenue =

Historic house in Florida, United States

- U.S. National Register of Historic Places
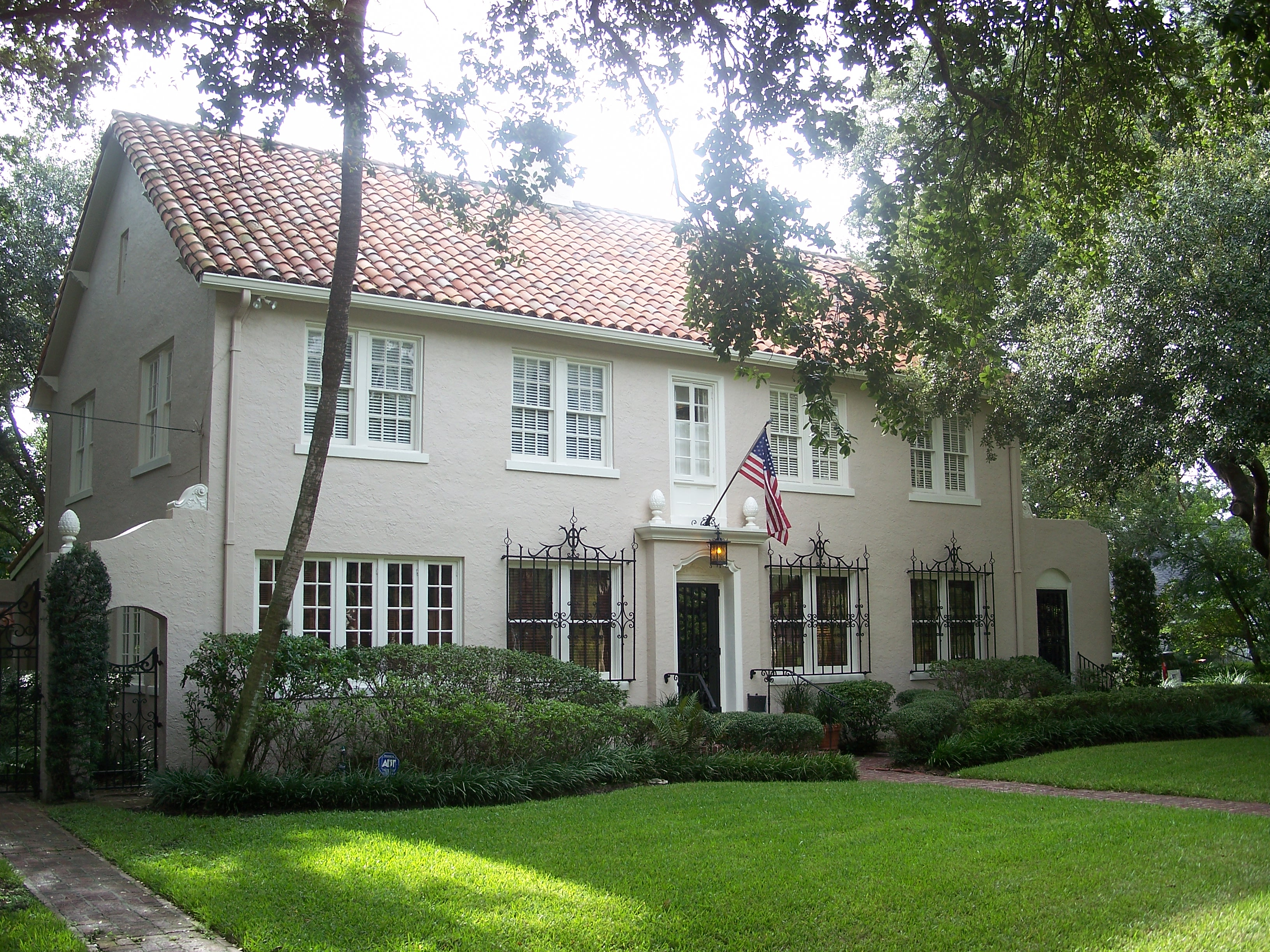

- Location within Florida Location within the United States
- Location: Tampa, Florida
- Coordinates: 27°55′17″N 82°27′33″W
- Built: 1928
- Architect: Adams, Franklin O., Jr.; Hanson, Gustavus
- Architectural style: Mission/Spanish Revival
- MPS: Mediterranean Revival Style Buildings of Davis Islands MPS
- NRHP reference No.: 89000962
- Added to NRHP: August 3, 1989

The House at 418 Blanca Avenue is a historic home in Tampa, Florida. It is located at 418 Blanca Avenue. On August 3, 1989, it was added to the U.S. National Register of Historic Places.

== References and external links ==
- Hillsborough County listings at National Register of Historic Places
