= Davis Islands (Tampa) =

- Neighborhood
- Location within the state of Florida
- Coordinates: 27°55′19″N 82°27′20″W
- Country: United States
- State: Florida
- County: Hillsborough
- City: Tampa

Population (2010)
  - Total: 5,474
- Time zone: UTC-5 (Eastern (EST))
  - Summer (DST): UTC-4 (EDT)

Davis Islands is a Tampa neighborhood and archipelago on two (formerly three) islands in Hillsborough County, Florida. Its proximity to Downtown Tampa and its views of the Port of Tampa have made it a popular area to live. The area's population was 5,474 at the 2010 census.

== About Davis Islands ==
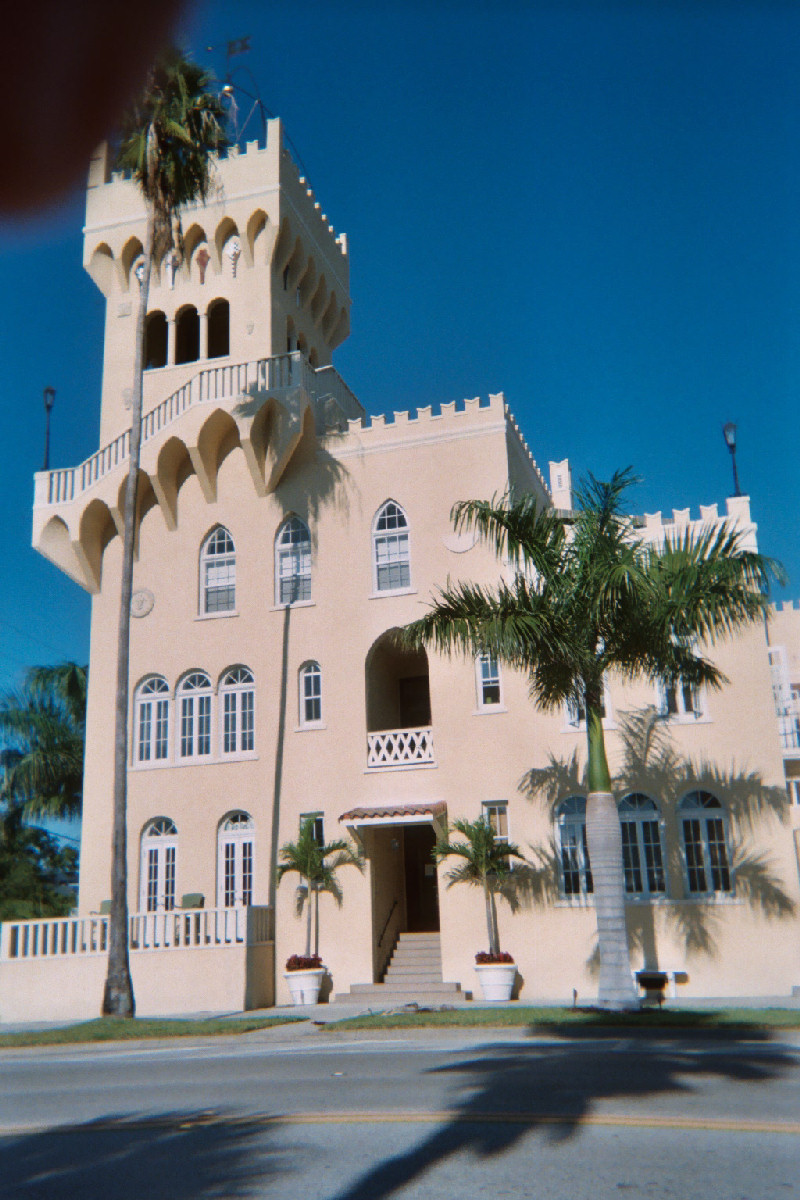
Palace of Florence Apartments on Davis Islands

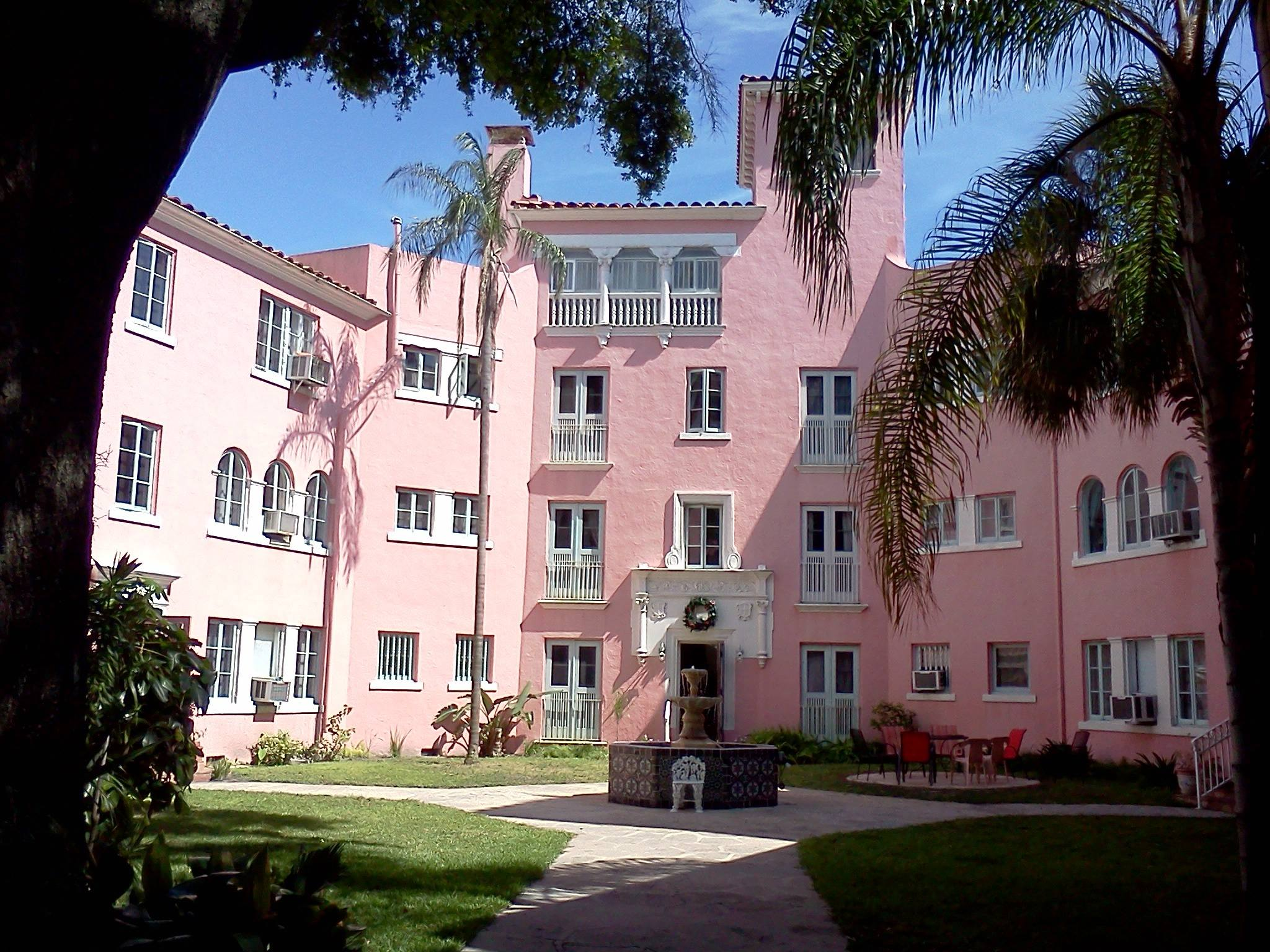
Villa de Leon

Davis Islands is also home to Peter O. Knight Airport and Davis Island Yacht Club. Also on the Islands are the Marjorie Park Municipal Yacht Basin & Marjorie Park at 115 Columbia Drive and the Seaplane Basin just South of the Airport. Marjorie Park was donated to the City of Tampa and named by Davis after his wife Marjorie Merritt Davis.

With a canal fully separating a portion of the island from the rest of it, Davis Islands is technically an archipelago, hence the plural form "Islands" in its name. Originally, Davis Islands consisted of three islands. With the construction of the airport, however, the end of one canal was filled in to make enough land area for a runway, connecting the two largest islands at their southern ends and reducing the archipelago's island count to two.

== History ==
Davis Islands was built upon two man-made islands atop two small natural islands formerly known as "Little Grassy Key" and "Big Grassy Key" at the mouth of the Hillsborough River. The islands were built from mud dredged from the bottom of Tampa Bay in the 1920s and expanded. This dredge-and-fill operation was undertaken at the height of the Florida Land Boom by developer and Tampa native D. P. Davis. Davis then purchased all the dredged land for $350,000. He planned a resort community with three hotels, nine-hole golf course, airport, and swimming pool. D.P. Davis then sold 306 of the original lots for $1,683,582. The development stalled when the Florida land boom of the early 1920s wound down, and Davis was mysteriously lost at sea while making a transatlantic voyage in October 1926.

Many of the original Mediterranean-style structures are still standing and have received national Historic Designation, as well as local protections. Buildings of note include the Palace of Florence and Mirasol. Today Davis Islands is a mix of residential and retail areas. Most predominant today is an eclectic mix of architectural styles because of the slowdown in development in the 1930s.

== Business district ==
East Davis Boulevard is the commercial area of the neighborhood. Along several blocks there are restaurants, cafes, bars, and shops in a tranquil sidewalk setting. The area is also very pet-friendly due to the pedestrian nature of the island.

Tampa General Hospital is located at the northern tip of the Islands. It functions as the area's largest tertiary referral center, Level I Trauma center and teaching hospital affiliated with the University of South Florida Colleges of Medicine and Nursing. Criticism has long been directed at regional planners for maintaining a facility of its importance during various public emergencies having been located and expanded upon where hurricanes and rising water (in what is designated an 'A' Flood zone) could, and have, resulted in the facility's evacuation.

== Recreational facilities ==
The Davis Islands Trail linear park was completed in 2010, with amenities such as benches and water fountains. The 10-foot-wide asphalt trail is 1.3 miles and runs from Channel Drive and Davis Boulevard to the parking lot at Peter O. Knight Airport. In 2014, the Roy Jenkins Pool reopened after a $2.5 million renovation. The 85-year-old building at 154 Columbia Drive has two pools, one with five swim lanes extending 75 feet and the other kiddie-sized. Other sports facilities include the Sandra W. Freedman Tennis Complex and an array of softball fields at Davis Islands Park.

== Famous residents ==
Derek Jeter built a 30,875-square-foot (2,868.4 m^{2}), seven-bedroom, nine-bathroom waterfront home in the vicinity, drawing comparisons to an aircraft carrier. The home dwarfs other nearby homes and is the largest home in the Tampa area. Other notable neighborhood residents include Tampa Bay Buccaneers quarterback Tom Brady, former NFL player Brad Culpepper, former Tampa Bay Lightning captain Vincent Lecavalier, Lightning players Steven Stamkos and Victor Hedman, former New York Yankees player Tino Martinez, and former Tampa mayor Bob Buckhorn.

== Demographics ==
As of the census of 2010, there were 5,747 people and 2,577 households residing in the neighborhood. The population density was 4,029/mi^{2}. The racial makeup of the neighborhood was 93% White, 2% African American, less than 1% Native American, 3% Asian, 1% from other races, and 2% from two or more races. Hispanic or Latino of any race were 11% of the population.

There were 2,577 households, out of which 24% had children under the age of 18 living with them, 44% were married couples living together, 7% had a female householder with no husband present, and 8% were non-families. 39% of all households were made up of individuals.

In the neighborhood the population was spread out, with 21% under the age of 18, 17% from 18 to 34, 23% from 35 to 49, 24% from 50 to 64, and 15% who were 65 years of age or older. For every 100 females, there were 98.4 males.

The per capita income for the neighborhood was $48,870. About 3% of the population were below the poverty line.

== See also ==
- List of Mediterranean Revival Style Buildings of Davis Islands

== Adjacent neighborhoods ==
- Harbour Island
- Downtown Tampa
- Hyde Park (Tampa)
