= National Register of Historic Places listings in Tampa, Florida =

Location of Tampa in Hillsborough County, Florida

This is a list of the National Register of Historic Places listings in Tampa, Florida.

This is intended to be a complete list of the properties and districts on the National Register of Historic Places in Tampa, Florida. The locations of National Register properties and districts for which the latitude and longitude coordinates are included below, may be seen in a map.

There are 79 properties and districts listed on the National Register in the city, including 3 National Historic Landmarks. Two other sites were once listed, but have been removed. The 22 properties and districts in Hillsborough County outside Tampa are listed in National Register of Historic Places listings in Hillsborough County, Florida.

This National Park Service list is complete through NPS recent listings posted October 30, 2026.

Contents: Counties in Florida (non-linked contain no National Register listings)
Alachua - Baker - Bay - Bradford - Brevard - Broward - Calhoun - Charlotte - Citrus - Clay - Collier - Columbia - DeSoto - Dixie - Duval - Escambia - Flagler - Franklin - Gadsden - Gilchrist - Glades - Gulf - Hamilton - Hardee - Hendry - Hernando - Highlands - Hillsborough (Tampa) - Holmes - Indian River - Jackson - Jefferson - Lafayette - Lake - Lee - Leon - Levy - Liberty - Madison - Manatee - Marion - Martin - Miami-Dade (Miami) - Monroe - Nassau - Okaloosa - Okeechobee - Orange - Osceola - Palm Beach - Pasco - Pinellas - Polk - Putnam - St. Johns - St. Lucie - Santa Rosa - Sarasota - Seminole - Sumter - Suwannee - Taylor - Union - Volusia - Wakulla - Walton - Washington

== Current listings ==
	Name on the Register	Image	Date listed	Location	Neighborhood	Description
1	Anderson-Frank House	Anderson-Frank House	April 22, 1982 (#82002375)	341 Plant Avenue; 27°56′21″N 82°27′48″W	Hyde Park	
2	Bay Isle Commercial Building	Bay Isle Commercial Building	August 3, 1989 (#89000971)	238 East Davis Boulevard; 27°55′33″N 82°27′13″W	Davis Islands	Part of the Mediterranean Revival Style Buildings of Davis Islands MPS
3	Centro Asturiano	Centro Asturiano	July 24, 1974 (#74000631)	1913 Nebraska Avenue; 27°57′42″N 82°27′03″W	V.M. Ybor	
4	Circulo Cubano de Tampa	Circulo Cubano de Tampa	November 15, 1972 (#72000320)	10th Avenue and 14th Street; 27°57′39″N 82°26′42″W	Ybor City	
5	William E. Curtis House	William E. Curtis House	August 27, 1987 (#87001424)	808 East Curtis Street; 27°59′16″N 82°27′46″W	Southeast Seminole Heights	
6	El Centro Español de Tampa	El Centro Español de Tampa	June 3, 1988 (#88001823)	1526-1536 East Seventh Avenue; 27°57′36″N 82°26′31″W	Ybor City	
7	El Centro Espanol of West Tampa	El Centro Espanol of West Tampa	July 30, 1974 (#74000632)	2306 North Howard Street; 27°57′41″N 82°29′00″W	West Tampa	
8	El Pasaje	El Pasaje	November 15, 1972 (#72000321)	14th Street and Palm Avenue; 27°57′42″N 82°26′41″W	Ybor City	
9	Episcopal House of Prayer	Episcopal House of Prayer	February 21, 1991 (#91000105)	2708 Central Avenue; 27°58′00″N 82°27′20″W	Tampa Heights	
10	Federal Building, U.S. Courthouse, Downtown Postal Station	Federal Building, U.S. Courthouse, Downtown Postal Station	June 7, 1974 (#74000633)	601 Florida Avenue; 27°56′59″N 82°27′27″W	Downtown Tampa	
11	Federal Office Building		September 6, 2022 (#100008119)	500 East Zack St. 27°57′03″N 82°27′25″W	Downtown Tampa	
12	First Federal Savings and Loan Association of Tampa	First Federal Savings and Loan Association of Tampa	October 17, 2018 (#100003023)	220 East Madison St. 27°56′54″N 82°27′31″W	Downtown Tampa	
13	Floridan Hotel	Floridan Hotel	March 12, 1996 (#96000315)	905 North Florida Avenue; 27°57′06″N 82°26′54″W	Downtown Tampa	
14	Fort Homer W. Hesterly National Guard Armory	Fort Homer W. Hesterly National Guard Armory	October 23, 2013 (#13000852)	522 N. Howard Ave. 27°56′59″N 82°29′02″W	West Tampa	
15	Isaac Gardner Sr. House	Isaac Gardner Sr. House	October 13, 2003 (#03001013)	209 West Palm Avenue; 27°57′51″N 82°27′47″W	Tampa Heights	
16	George Guida Sr. House	George Guida Sr. House	March 29, 2006 (#06000193)	1516 North Renfrew Avenue; 27°57′31″N 82°29′49″W	McFarlane Park	
17	Hampton Terrace Historic District	Hampton Terrace Historic District	January 27, 1999 (#99000045)	Roughly bounded by Hanna Avenue, 15th Street, Hillsborough Avenue, and Nebraska Avenue; 27°59′58″N 82°26′50″W	Old Seminole Heights	
18	Perry Harvey Sr. Park Skateboard Bowl	Perry Harvey Sr. Park Skateboard Bowl	October 7, 2013 (#13000811)	900 E. Scott St. 27°57′18″N 82°27′20″W	South Nebraska	Demolished as part of a renovation of Perry Harvey Sr. Park.
19	House at 36 Aegean Avenue	House at 36 Aegean Avenue	November 13, 1989 (#89001964)	36 Aegean Avenue; 27°56′04″N 82°27′34″W	Davis Islands	Part of the Mediterranean Revival Style Buildings of Davis Islands MPS
20	House at 36 Columbia Drive	House at 36 Columbia Drive	August 3, 1989 (#89000966)	36 Columbia Drive; 27°56′05″N 82°27′26″W	Davis Islands	Part of the Mediterranean Revival Style Buildings of Davis Islands MPS
21	House at 53 Aegean Avenue	House at 53 Aegean Avenue	August 3, 1989 (#89000955)	53 Aegean Avenue; 27°55′58″N 82°27′33″W	Davis Islands	Part of the Mediterranean Revival Style Buildings of Davis Islands MPS
22	House at 59 Aegean Avenue	House at 59 Aegean Avenue	August 3, 1989 (#89000956)	59 Aegean Avenue; 27°55′57″N 82°27′33″W	Davis Islands	Part of the Mediterranean Revival Style Buildings of Davis Islands MPS
23	House at 84 Adalia Avenue	House at 84 Adalia Avenue	August 3, 1989 (#89000953)	84 Adalia Avenue; 27°55′51″N 82°27′40″W	Davis Islands	Part of the Mediterranean Revival Style Buildings of Davis Islands MPS
24	House at 97 Adriatic Avenue	House at 97 Adriatic Avenue	August 3, 1989 (#89000954)	97 Adriatic Avenue; 27°55′55″N 82°27′37″W	Davis Islands	Part of the Mediterranean Revival Style Buildings of Davis Islands MPS
25	House at 100 West Davis Boulevard	House at 100 West Davis Boulevard	August 3, 1989 (#89000972)	100 West Davis Boulevard; 27°55′48″N 82°27′25″W	Davis Islands	Part of the Mediterranean Revival Style Buildings of Davis Islands MPS
26	House at 116 West Davis Boulevard	House at 116 West Davis Boulevard	August 3, 1989 (#89000973)	116 West Davis Boulevard; 27°55′42″N 82°27′27″W	Davis Islands	Part of the Mediterranean Revival Style Buildings of Davis Islands MPS
27	House at 124 Baltic Circle	House at 124 Baltic Circle	August 3, 1989 (#89000957)	124 Baltic Circle; 27°55′48″N 82°27′33″W	Davis Islands	Part of the Mediterranean Revival Style Buildings of Davis Islands MPS
28	House at 125 Baltic Circle	House at 125 Baltic Circle	August 3, 1989 (#89000958)	125 Baltic Circle; 27°55′48″N 82°27′30″W	Davis Islands	Part of the Mediterranean Revival Style Buildings of Davis Islands MPS
29	House at 131 West Davis Boulevard	House at 131 West Davis Boulevard	January 8, 1990 (#89002161)	131 West Davis Boulevard; 27°55′38″N 82°27′28″W	Davis Islands	Part of the Mediterranean Revival Style Buildings of Davis Islands MPS
30	House at 132 Baltic Circle	House at 132 Baltic Circle	August 3, 1989 (#89000959)	132 Baltic Circle; 27°55′46″N 82°27′31″W	Davis Islands	Part of the Mediterranean Revival Style Buildings of Davis Islands MPS
31	House at 161 Bosporous Avenue	House at 161 Bosporous Avenue	August 3, 1989 (#89000963)	161 Bosporous Avenue; 27°55′33″N 82°27′26″W	Davis Islands	Part of the Mediterranean Revival Style Buildings of Davis Islands MPS
32	House at 190 Bosporous Avenue	House at 190 Bosporous Avenue	August 3, 1989 (#89000964)	190 Bosporous Avenue; 27°55′31″N 82°27′27″W	Davis Islands	Part of the Mediterranean Revival Style Buildings of Davis Islands MPS
33	House at 200 Corsica Avenue	House at 200 Corsica Avenue	August 3, 1989 (#89000967)	200 Corsica Avenue; 27°55′31″N 82°27′38″W	Davis Islands	Part of the Mediterranean Revival Style Buildings of Davis Islands MPS
34	House at 202 Blanca Avenue	House at 202 Blanca Avenue	August 3, 1989 (#89000960)	202 Blanca Avenue; 27°55′36″N 82°27′42″W	Davis Islands	Part of the Mediterranean Revival Style Buildings of Davis Islands MPS
35	House at 220 Blanca Avenue	House at 220 Blanca Avenue	August 3, 1989 (#89000961)	220 Blanca Avenue; 27°55′31″N 82°27′39″W	Davis Islands	Part of the Mediterranean Revival Style Buildings of Davis Islands MPS
36	House at 301 Caspian Street	House at 301 Caspian Street	August 3, 1989 (#89000965)	301 Caspian Street; 27°55′27″N 82°27′34″W	Davis Islands	Part of the Mediterranean Revival Style Buildings of Davis Islands MPS
37	House at 418 Blanca Avenue	House at 418 Blanca Avenue	August 3, 1989 (#89000962)	418 Blanca Avenue; 27°55′17″N 82°27′33″W	Davis Islands	Part of the Mediterranean Revival Style Buildings of Davis Islands MPS
38	Hutchinson House	Hutchinson House	November 1, 1977 (#77000404)	304 Plant Avenue; 27°56′28″N 82°27′46″W	Hyde Park	
39	Hyde Park Historic Districts	Hyde Park Historic Districts	March 4, 1985 (#85000454)	Roughly bounded by the Hillsborough River and Bay, Howard Avenue, and Kennedy Boulevard; 27°56′11″N 82°28′23″W	Hyde Park	
40	Captain William Parker Jackson House	Captain William Parker Jackson House	April 8, 2011 (#11000159)	800 E Lambright St; 28°00′24″N 82°27′09″W	Old Seminole Heights	
41	Jackson Rooming House	Jackson Rooming House	March 7, 2007 (#07000112)	851 Zack Street; 27°57′08″N 82°27′07″W	Downtown Tampa	
42	Johnson-Wolff House	Johnson-Wolff House	July 24, 1974 (#74000634)	6823 South DeSoto Street; 27°51′59″N 82°31′34″W	Port Tampa City	
43	S. H. Kress and Co. Building	S. H. Kress and Co. Building	April 7, 1983 (#83001424)	811 North Franklin Street; 27°57′03″N 82°27′34″W	Downtown Tampa	
44	Lafayette Street Bridge	Lafayette Street Bridge	February 20, 2018 (#100002094)	Kennedy Boulevard over Hillsboro R. 27°56′48″N 82°27′40″W	Downtown Tampa	Better known today as the Kennedy Blvd. Drawbridge.
45	LeClaire Apartments	LeClaire Apartments	November 16, 1988 (#88001697)	3013-3015 San Carlos; 27°55′22″N 82°29′37″W	Palma Ceia	
46	Leiman House	Leiman House	September 9, 1974 (#74000635)	716 South Newport Avenue; 27°56′08″N 82°28′18″W	Hyde Park	
47	Masonic Temple No. 25	Masonic Temple No. 25	September 11, 1986 (#86002415)	508 East Kennedy Boulevard; 27°56′54″N 82°27′04″W	Downtown Tampa	
48	Meacham Elementary School	Meacham Elementary School	September 15, 2005 (#05001041)	1225 India Street; 27°57′19″N 82°27′11″W	South Nebraska	Part of the Florida's Historic Black Public Schools MPS. In 2007, the school building was demolished as part of a redevelopment project of the area
49	Michigan Avenue Bridge	Michigan Avenue Bridge	September 25, 2017 (#100001669)	Columbus Dr. over the Hillsborough R. 27°58′00″N 82°28′31″W	Old West Tampa, Riverside Heights, and Ridgewood Park	Better known today as the Columbus Drive Swing Span Bridge.
50	North Franklin Street Historic District	North Franklin Street Historic District	March 28, 2002 (#02000264)	Roughly bounded by Florida Avenue and East Fortune, Tampa, Franklin, and East Harrison Streets; 27°57′15″N 82°27′37″W	Downtown Tampa	
51	Oaklawn and St. Louis Cemeteries Historic District	Oaklawn and St. Louis Cemeteries Historic District	September 25, 2017 (#100001668)	606 E. Harriston St. 27°57′14″N 82°27′26″W	Downtown Tampa	
52	Old Hillsborough County High School	Old Hillsborough County High School	May 15, 2007 (#07000423)	2704 North Highland Avenue; 27°58′05″N 82°27′47″W	Tampa Heights	
53	Old People's Home	Old People's Home	October 17, 2000 (#00001198)	1203 East 22nd Avenue; 27°57′41″N 82°26′48″W	V.M. Ybor	
54	Old School House	Old School House	December 4, 1974 (#74000636)	Lafayette Street on the University of Tampa campus 27°56′48″N 82°27′55″W	University of Tampa	
55	Old Tampa Children's Home	Old Tampa Children's Home	July 22, 1999 (#99000863)	3302 North Tampa Avenue; 27°58′27″N 82°27′35″W	Tampa Heights	
56	Old Tampa Free Public Library	Old Tampa Free Public Library	May 16, 1991 (#91000618)	102 East Seventh Avenue; 27°57′37″N 82°27′38″W	Tampa Heights	
57	Old Union Depot Hotel	Old Union Depot Hotel	December 11, 2000 (#00001228)	858 East Zack Street; 27°57′10″N 82°27′05″W	Downtown Tampa	Demolished
58	Original Rogers Park Golf Course Site	Original Rogers Park Golf Course Site	November 12, 2014 (#14000901)	7801 N. 30th St. 28°01′20″N 82°25′25″W	Old Seminole Heights	
59	Palace of Florence Apartments	Palace of Florence Apartments	August 3, 1989 (#89000969)	45 East Davis Boulevard; 27°56′02″N 82°27′28″W	Davis Islands	Part of the Mediterranean Revival Style Buildings of Davis Islands MPS
60	Palmerin Hotel	Palmerin Hotel	August 3, 1989 (#89000970)	115 East Davis Boulevard; 27°55′46″N 82°27′22″W	Davis Islands	Part of the Mediterranean Revival Style Buildings of Davis Islands MPS
61	Palmetto Beach Historic District	Palmetto Beach Historic District	August 14, 2012 (#12000496)	Roughly bounded by Durham, 28th, Thrace, & 22nd Streets; 27°56′53″N 82°25′53″W	Palmetto Beach	
62	Horace T. Robles House	Horace T. Robles House	March 2, 2006 (#06000091)	2604 East Hanna Avenue; 28°00′13″N 82°25′48″W	Old Seminole Heights	
63	Roosevelt Elementary School	Roosevelt Elementary School	May 31, 2006 (#06000443)	3205 South Ferdinand Avenue; 27°54′59″N 82°29′52″W	Palma Ceia	
64	St. Andrews Episcopal Church	St. Andrews Episcopal Church	April 15, 2009 (#09000200)	505 N. Marion St. 27°56′58″N 82°27′24″W	Downtown Tampa	
65	Seminole Heights Residential District	Seminole Heights Residential District	August 5, 1993 (#93000751)	Roughly bounded by Osborne, Florida, Hanna, and Cherokee Avenues; 27°59′45″N 82°27′25″W	Old Seminole Heights	
66	Spanish Apartments	Spanish Apartments	August 3, 1989 (#89000968)	16 East Davis Boulevard; 27°56′08″N 82°27′35″W	Davis Islands	Part of the Mediterranean Revival Style Buildings of Davis Islands MPS
67	SS AMERICAN VICTORY (Victory ship)	SS AMERICAN VICTORY (Victory ship)	February 4, 2002 (#01001533)	705 Channelside Dr., Berth 271; 27°56′42″N 82°26′39″W	Channel District	
68	Stovall House	Stovall House	September 4, 1974 (#74000637)	4621 Bayshore Boulevard; 27°53′47″N 82°29′24″W	Bayshore Beautiful	
69	T. C. Taliaferro House	T. C. Taliaferro House	October 1, 1974 (#74000638)	305 South Hyde Park; 27°56′28″N 82°27′52″W	Hyde Park	
70	Tampa Bay Hotel	Tampa Bay Hotel	December 5, 1972 (#72000322)	401 West Kennedy Boulevard; 27°56′46″N 82°27′51″W	Downtown Tampa	Includes the Henry B. Plant Museum and the University of Tampa
71	Tampa City Hall	Tampa City Hall	October 1, 1974 (#74000639)	315 John F. Kennedy Boulevard, East; 27°56′50″N 82°27′27″W	Downtown Tampa	
72	Tampa Heights Historic District	Tampa Heights Historic District	August 4, 1995 (#95000979)	Roughly bounded by Adalee Street, Interstate 275, 7th Avenue, and North Tampa Avenue; 27°57′54″N 82°27′27″W	Tampa Heights	
73	Tampa Theatre and Office Building	Tampa Theatre and Office Building	January 3, 1978 (#78000945)	711 Franklin Street; 27°57′00″N 82°27′32″W	Downtown Tampa	
74	Tampania House	Tampania House	September 12, 1985 (#85002178)	4611 North A Street; 27°56′45″N 82°30′19″W	Oakford Park	
75	Union Railroad Station	Union Railroad Station	June 5, 1974 (#74000640)	601 North Nebraska Street; 27°57′08″N 82°27′04″W	Downtown and Channel District	
76	Upper North Franklin Street Commercial District	Upper North Franklin Street Commercial District	June 9, 2010 (#10000344)	Bounded by E Oak Ave, N Florida Ave, Kay St, and N Tampa St; 27°57′34″N 82°27′37″W	Tampa Heights	
77	West Tampa Historic District	West Tampa Historic District	October 18, 1983 (#83003539)	Roughly bounded by Cypress and Ivy Streets, Fremont and Habana Avenues; 27°57′34″N 82°29′02″W	West Tampa	
78	Ybor City Historic District	Ybor City Historic District	August 28, 1974 (#74000641)	Roughly bounded by 6th Avenue, 13th Street, 10th Avenue and 22nd Street, East Broadway between 13th and 22nd Streets; 27°57′45″N 82°26′28″W	Ybor City	
79	Ybor Factory Building	Ybor Factory Building	November 15, 1972 (#72000323)	7th Avenue between 13th and 14th Streets; 27°57′38″N 82°26′43″W	Ybor City	

== Former listings ==
	Name on the Register	Image	Date listed	Date removed	Location	City or town	Description
1	Building at 1415 North Franklin Street		September 17, 1974 (#77001580)	June 21, 1977	1415 North Franklin Street	Downtown Tampa	Destroyed by fire April 5, 1977.
2	Chapin House		July 24, 1974 (#76002283)	September 15, 1989	4607 Bayshore Blvd.	Downtown Tampa	Damaged by fire in 1973. Destroyed by fire on July 10, 1976.
3	Hayden Estate Building	Hayden Estate Building	November 1, 1984 (#84000197)	September 15, 1989	1016-1016 1/2 N. Franklin St.	Downtown Tampa	Destroyed by fire April 4, 1987
4	Levick House	Levick House	July 30, 1974 (#74002258)	January 20, 1975	2202 N. Highland St.	Tampa Heights	Demolished

== See also ==
- List of National Historic Landmarks in Florida
- National Register of Historic Places listings in Hillsborough County, Florida
- National Register of Historic Places listings in Florida
- List of Mediterranean Revival Style Buildings of Davis Islands
