= Guida =

Guida is a given name and surname. Of Italian origin, it is the patronymic or plural form of Guido. It can also mean "guide" in longer names such as Cacciaguida.

== People with the surname ==
- Robert "Bob" J. Giuda (born 1952), American politician from New Hampshire
- Clay Guida (born 1981), American mixed martial artist
- Frank Guida (1922–2007), American composer and music producer
- George Guida (1924–2015), American sprinter
- Gloria Guida (born 1955), Italian actress and model
- Jason Guida (born 1977), American mixed martial artist
- Luigi Guida (1883–1951), Italian composer, pianist, organist, and conductor
- Marco Guida (born 1981), Italian football referee
- Maria Guida (born 1966), Italian long-distance runner
- Tony Guida (born 1941), American television and radio personality from New York
- Viviano Guida (born 1955), Italian football player
- Wandisa Guida (born 1935), Italian actress

== People with the given name ==
- Guida Diehl (1868–1961), German teacher and founder of Neulandbund, a Nazi organisation for women
- Guida Maria (1950–2018), Portuguese actress

== See also ==
- Guida (music), a music notation symbol that is similar to a catchword in literature
- George Guida, Sr. House, a historic U.S. home in Florida
