= Old people's home =

Old people's home may refer to:

- Retirement home, a multi-residence housing facility for the elderly
- Nursing home, a residential facility with nursing care for elderly or disabled people
- Old People's Home (Omaha), Nebraska, U.S.
- Old People's Home (Tampa, Florida), U.S.
- Old People's Home for 4 Year Olds, a 2019 Australian television series based on the 2017 British series
- Old People's Home, a 2008 art installation by Sun Yuan & Peng Yu
