= Jesse Carter =

Jesse Carter may refer to:

- Jesse Carter (Florida politician), in the 19th century
- Jesse F. Carter (1873–1943), Associate Justice of the South Carolina Supreme Court
- Jesse W. Carter (1888–1959), Associate Justice of the California Supreme Court
- Jesse Carter (boxer) (born 1958), twice defeated by Buster Drayton
- Jesse Benedict Carter (1872–1917), American classicist
- Jesse McI. Carter (1863–1930), U.S. Army general
