= Old Schoolhouse =

Old Schoolhouse or Old School House may refer to:

in the United Kingdom

- Old School House, Beverley, East Riding, England
- Old School House, Cronkbourne, Douglas, Isle of Man, one of Isle of Man's Registered Buildings

in the United States

- Old School House (Tampa, Florida), NRHP-listed
- Old Schoolhouse (York, Maine), listed on the National Register of Historic Places in York County, Maine
- Old Schoolhouse (Mount Holly, New Jersey), listed on the National Register of Historic Places in Burlington County, New Jersey
