= Old Union Depot Hotel =

- U.S. National Register of Historic Places
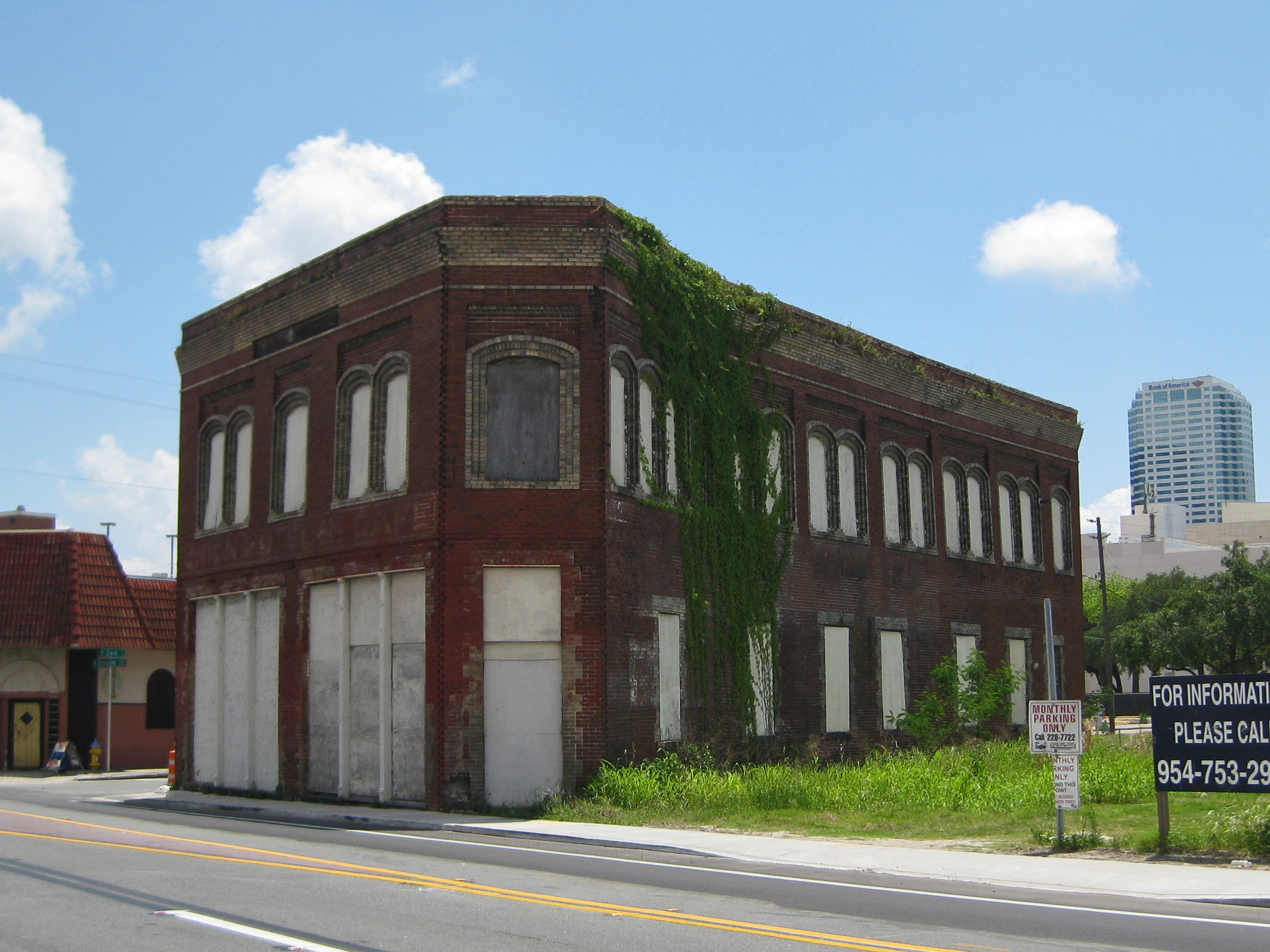
- Old Union Depot Hotel, two weeks prior to its demolition

- Location within Florida Location within the United States
- Location: 858 East Zack Street; Tampa; Hillsborough County; Florida; United States
- Coordinates: 27°57′10″N 82°27′5″W
- Area: less than one acre
- Built: 1912
- Architectural style: Masonry Vernacular
- Demolished: May 23, 2010
- NRHP reference No.: 00001228
- Added to NRHP: December 11, 2000

The Old Union Depot Hotel (previously known as the Union Hotel and Cafe) was a historic hotel and commercial building in Tampa, Florida, United States. The building was constructed in 1912 at 858 East Zack Street, directly across Nebraska Avenue from Tampa Union Station. On December 11, 2000, it was added to the U.S. National Register of Historic Places, however, the building was torn down on May 23, 2010.

Built as one of twelve continuous, two-story, brick storefronts around the intersection of Nebraska Avenue and East Zack Street, on the northeastern edge of downtown Tampa, the building had six sides, an unusual design made necessary by the irregular shape of the lot upon which it was built. The hotel and its neighboring businesses generally catered to train passengers arriving at Union Station, which like the hotel, first opened in 1912. Of those dozen commercial buildings, the Union Hotel structure was the last to remain standing. Its standing as a hotel, however, could not last indefinitely, and after a period of time the Union Hotel and Cafe closed. The building was boarded up and sat vacant for a period of many years, during which time it failed to attract any new occupants.

On December 11, 2000, the Old Union Depot Hotel building was recognized with a listing in the U.S. National Register of Historic Places (NRHP). It had been hoped that the historic status and accompanying tax incentives would be catalysts towards restoration and preservation of the building, but after a lengthy period of disuse, and nearly a decade after its NRHP designation, the building suffered a collapse of its roof and was deemed to be hazardous. The city of Tampa condemned the structure and ordered its demolition, which took place on May 23, 2010.

The Union Hotel and Cafe began its operations during the era of racial segregation, and functioned as an establishment for "whites only". Train passengers and other travelers who were black were directed about one block west from the hotel along Zack Street to the Jackson House, a rooming house which was one of the only lodging establishments in the city for blacks. The Jackson Rooming House building, incidentally, was built during the same period as the Union Depot Hotel, and is also NRHP-listed.

== See also ==
- National Register of Historic Places listings in Tampa, Florida
