= Rialto Theatre (Tampa, Florida) =

Theater in Tampa, Florida, United States

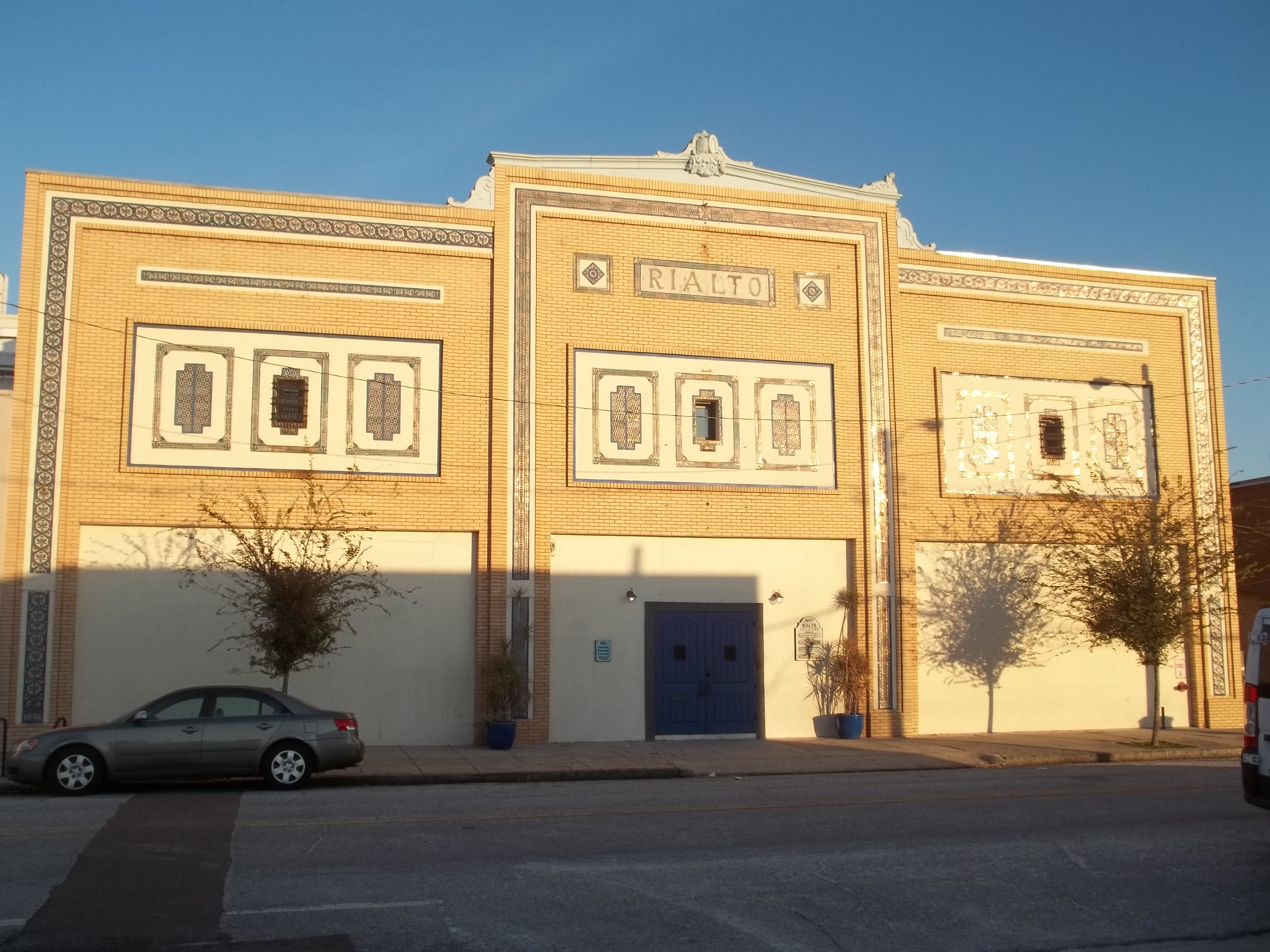

The Rialto Theatre is located in an area of Tampa's Franklin Street nominated for listing in National Register of Historic Places March 19, 2010 Tampa Bay Times, and recently nicknamed the "Yellow Brick Row" during the Better Block Project North Franklin Street in January 2015. It is located in the National Register of Historic Places listed Upper North Franklin Street Commercial District. The building's architecture is credited to P.J. Kennard (Philip F. Kennard was the son of Tampa-based architect Francis J. Kennard).
