= Thomas Jefferson High School (Tampa, Florida) =

Public high school in Tampa, Florida

Coordinates: 27.954019°N 82.52018°W

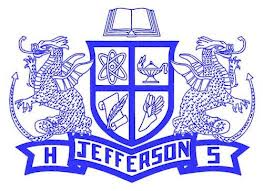

Location
- 4401 Cypress Street; Tampa, Florida 33607; United States

Information
- Type: Public high school
- Established: 1939
- School district: Hillsborough County Public Schools
- Principal: Dr. Jennifer Canady
- Staff: 60.50 (FTE)
- Grades: 9–12
- Student to teacher ratio: 22.40
- Colors: Blue and gold
- Athletics: Football, basketball, baseball, wrestling, cross country, track, swimming, volleyball, golf, cheerleading, soccer, tennis, softball, flag-football, lacrosse.
- Athletics conference: 6A
- Mascot: Dragons
- Website: www.hillsboroughschools.org/o/jefferson

Thomas Jefferson High School is a public high school located in the heart of the Westshore Business District of Tampa, Florida, United States. It is an Area 1 school under the Hillsborough County Public Schools system.

== History ==
In 1939, due to the increasing high school population in the Tampa area, Thomas Jefferson High School was founded in the Old Hillsborough County High School building at 2704 N. Highland Avenue in the city's Tampa Heights neighborhood. Named after the third president of the United States, Thomas Jefferson, its first principal was D.W. Waters and its first class graduated in 1942. By 1967, the school board decided that its location no longer met modern educational requirements and the first Jefferson High School was closed. Upon closure of the school, students were sent to neighboring schools to complete their education. The original Thomas Jefferson High School building still exists today as the D.W. Waters Career Center.

On August 27, 1973, the new Jefferson High School building was opened at its current location on West Cypress Street.

== Demographics ==
Jefferson HS is 53% Hispanic, 34% Black, 9% White, and 4% Other

== Magnet Program ==
In 2001, Thomas Jefferson High instituted a magnet program with courses focusing on international studies.

- International Business & Global Finance Honors
- International Culinary Arts Honors
- International Law & Criminal Justice Honors
- Maritime academy

The courses have since changed names and have slowly moved on from focusing on international studies to being college preparatory leadership academies for students.

Thomas Jefferson High School offers the following College Preparatory Leadership Academies to magnet students who apply:

- Business Ownership and Finance Academy
- Maritime and Marine Exploration Academy
- Law and Criminal Justice Leadership Academy
- Culinary Arts & Baking and Pastry Academy

The school also offers the AICE Diploma curriculum

== Athletics ==
=== Football ===
In 2010, the Dragons won the Class 3A State Championship. They finished the year 15-0 and ranked #8 nationally

in 2024, the Dragons won the Class 3A District Championship and had an undefeated season.

== Music ==
The Music programs offered at Jefferson High School are:

- Marching Band
- Winter Guard
- Jazz Band
- Symphonic Band
- Percussion Ensemble
- Orchestra

== Extracurricular activities ==
Jefferson High students participate in clubs, groups, and organizations.

- Honors clubs

Beta, Mu Alpha Theta, National Honor Society, National English Honor Society, French Honor Society, Tri-M National Music Honor Society.

- Magnet clubs

DECA, FBLA, FCCLA, FPSA (Florida Public Service Association), Tri-M Music Honor Society, Mock Trial Team

- Interest clubs

, FCA, Crochet, Psychology, Book, Speech & Debate, First Priority, Male/Female Weightlifting,Health Club.

- Additional

School newspaper, literary magazine, yearbook.

== Notable alumni ==
- Coleman Bell, NFL football player
- Ventell Bryant, NFL wide receiver
- Andre Caldwell, NFL football player
- Reche Caldwell, NFL football player
- Rick Casares, NFL football player
- Kirby Dar Dar, NFL football player
- André Davis, NFL wide receiver
- Lenny Faedo, Major League Baseball player
- Stephen Garcia, former quarterback for the South Carolina Gamecocks, Canadian Football League, and arena football
- Luis Gonzalez, Major League Baseball player
- Jimmy Herget, Major League Baseball player
- Tarence Kinsey, NBA Basketball player, continued playing 2016 to 2020 in Israel and Europe.
- Tony La Russa, Major League Baseball player/manager. Member Baseball Hall of Fame.
- Fred McGriff Major League Baseball player. Member Baseball Hall of Fame.
- Chris Moore, NFL wide receiver
- Bob Martinez, former Tampa mayor and Florida governor
- Tino Martinez, Major League Baseball player
- Sam Militello, Major League Baseball player
- Keith Newman, NFL football player
- Ferdie Pacheco, Physician for Muhammad Ali
- Al Pardo, Major League Baseball player
- Prechae Rodriguez, NFL football player
- Fred Rath, Jr., Major League Baseball player
- Torrance Small, NFL football player
- Oscar Smith, NFL football player
- K. D. Williams, NFL football player
- Ramik Wilson, NFL Linebacker
- Tony Zappone, author, photojournalist, broadcaster
