= Old School House (Tampa, Florida) =

- U.S. National Register of Historic Places
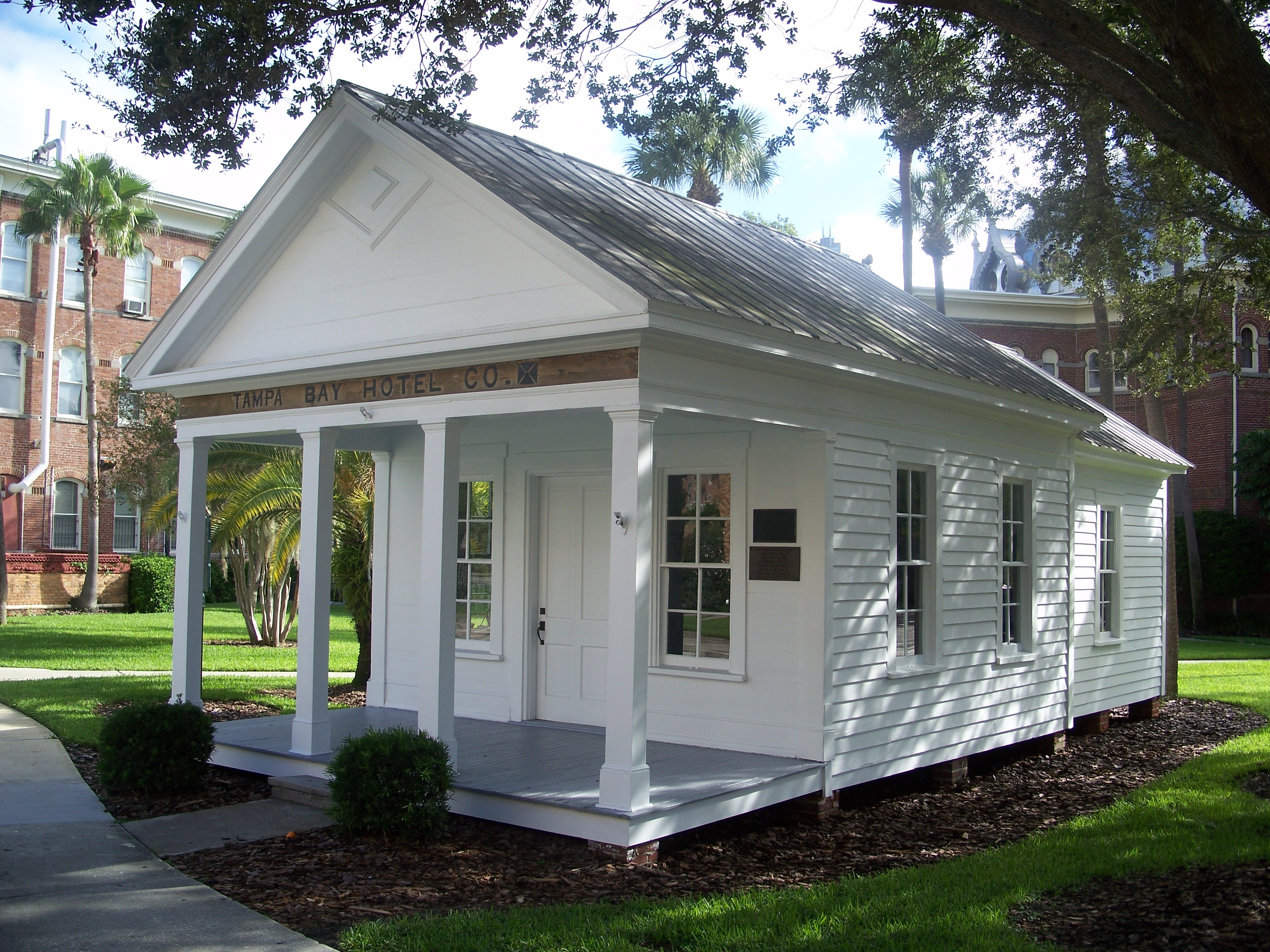
- Old School House (in right foreground), behind the former Tampa Bay Hotel on the University of Tampa campus

- Location within Florida Location within the United States
- Location: Lafayette St., University of Tampa campus, Tampa, Florida, United States
- Coordinates: 27°56′48″N 82°27′55″W
- Area: less than one acre
- Built: 1858
- Architect: Carter, Jesse
- NRHP reference No.: 74000636
- Added to NRHP: December 4, 1974

The Old School House is a historic landmark located on the University of Tampa campus in Tampa, Florida, United States. Built in 1858, it is one of Tampa's oldest standing buildings, and has been relocated twice from its original site. On December 4, 1974, it was added to the U.S. National Register of Historic Places in recognition of its cultural and historical significance.

Since 1931, the School House has been supported by the DeSoto Chapter of the National Society Daughters of the American Revolution. Today, the building is open for viewing by appointment and during semi-annual open house events.

== History ==
Old School House in 1974

The Old School House, originally built on the west bank of the Hillsborough River, what is now known as Plant Park, was constructed in early 1858 by General Jesse Carter as a selective school for girls. In 1886, Henry B. Plant purchased The Old School House and transformed it into a space that served multiple functions for the Tampa Bay Hotel, including as a tool shed, workshop, and pharmacy, until the hotel's closure in 1930.

In 1931, the School House was donated to the Daughters of the American Revolution who relocated it from the west bank to its present location. On February 22, 1983, a plaque summarizing the School House's history was unveiled on George Washington's birthday, and the building was opened to the public.
