= South Nebraska =

- Neighborhood
- Location within the state of Florida
- Coordinates: 27°57′39″N 82°27′5″W
- Country: United States
- State: Florida
- County: Hillsborough
- City: Tampa

Population (2000)
  - Total: 2,908
- Time zone: UTC-5 (Eastern (EST))
  - Summer (DST): UTC-4 (EDT)
- ZIP codes: 33602 and 33605

South Nebraska (also known as Central Park) is a neighborhood within the city limits of Tampa, Florida. As of the 2000 census the neighborhood had a population of 2,908. The ZIP codes of the neighborhood are 33602 and 33605.

== Geography ==
South Nebraska boundaries are Palm Avenue to the north, Florida Avenue to the west, Downtown Tampa to the south, and Ybor City to the east.

== Demographics ==
At the 2000 census there were 2,908 people and 1,069 households residing in the neighborhood. The population density was 6,463/mi^{2}. The racial makeup of the neighborhood was 14% White, 77% African American, 0% Native American, 1% Asian, less than 4% from other races, and 4% from two or more races. Hispanic or Latino of any race were 11.0%.

Of the 1,069 households 34% had children under the age of 18 living with them, 10% were married couples living together, 41% had a female householder with no husband present, and 8% were non-families. 39% of households were made up of individuals.

The age distribution was 38% under the age of 18, 23% from 18 to 34, 18% from 35 to 49, 9% from 50 to 64, and 13% 65 or older. The median age was 40 years. For every 100 females, there were 80.3 males.

The per capita income for the neighborhood was $10,037. About 65% of the population were below the poverty line, including 49.0% of those under age 18 and 10.0% of those age 65 or over.

== Central Avenue Black Business District ==
The Central Avenue Black Business District was an area in the Central Park (South Nebraska) neighborhood in Tampa. It was a hub for over 100 black stores and restaurants such as the Cotton Club where famous performers such as Ray Charles and Ella Fitzgerald came to perform. Although the area was in a mainly white downtown it was an enclave where people who lived in Black Tampa neighborhoods such as the Scrub (East Tampa), performers, minorities, and whites all could come and experience culture, get something to eat, shop, or find a place to stay. In fact, Ella Fitzgerald wrote her hit "A Tisket a Tasket" at the historic Jackson House on Scott Street. The tiny 1/4 of a mile neighborhood was also home to at least 3,000 residents many of whom lived in the Central Park Village projects. During the late 1950s the neighborhood begin to decline the quality of life at the projects began to deteriorate, crime became an issue, and in the 1960s the neighborhood became almost completely non-existent with the construction of Interstate 4 and I-275 through downtown Tampa. Many of its residents moved to areas such as East Tampa, West Tampa, or Ybor City; a neighborhood also devastated by interstate highway construction and urban renewal. In the 1960s the neighborhood saw a series of disturbances, and two riots particularly one that happened as the result of the shooting by mostly white police officers of a teenage black boy. In recent years the City of Tampa has worked hard to make Central Park a safe, urban, mixed-race, and mixed-income neighborhood. They demolished the aging Central Park Village Projects in order to make room for new development called Encore in partnership with Bank of America. The new residential area could bring at least 10,000 new residents to the Downtown Central Tampa area, of which up to 1,000 would be low-income.
