= Old Tampa Children's Home =

- U.S. National Register of Historic Places
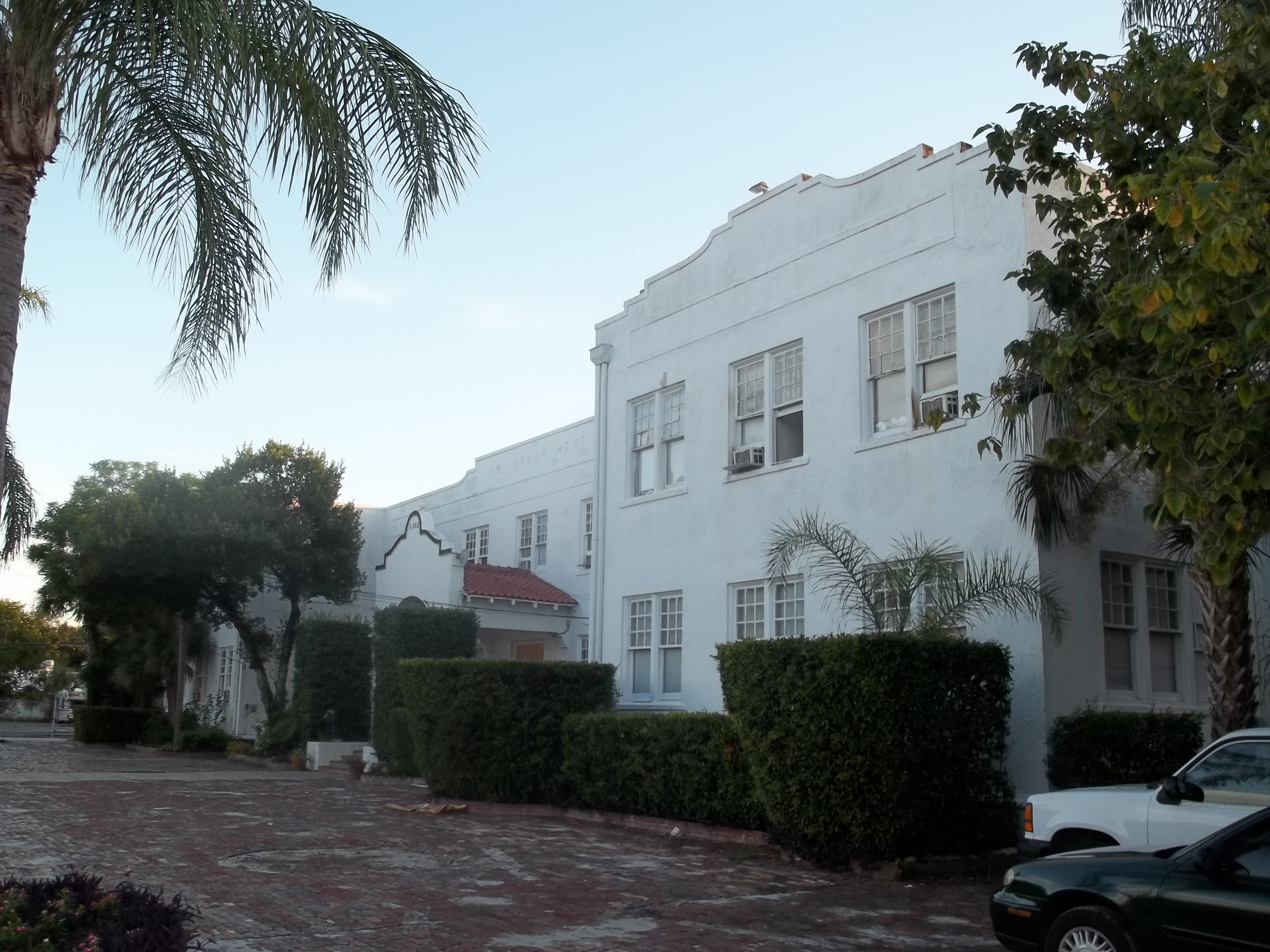

- Location within Florida Location within the United States
- Location: 3302 N. Tampa Ave., Tampa, Florida
- Coordinates: 27°58′28″N 82°27′35″W
- Area: 2 acres (0.81 ha)
- Architectural style: Mission/Spanish Revival
- NRHP reference No.: 99000863
- Added to NRHP: July 22, 1999

The Old Tampa Children's Home (also known as the Good Samaritan Inn) is a historic home in Tampa, Florida. Some sources have it located at 3302 North Tampa Avenue but this is incorrect. It is actually one block east on Florida Avenue. On July 22, 1999, it was added to the U.S. National Register of Historic Places.
