= T. C. Taliaferro House =

Historic home in Tampa, Florida

- U.S. National Register of Historic Places
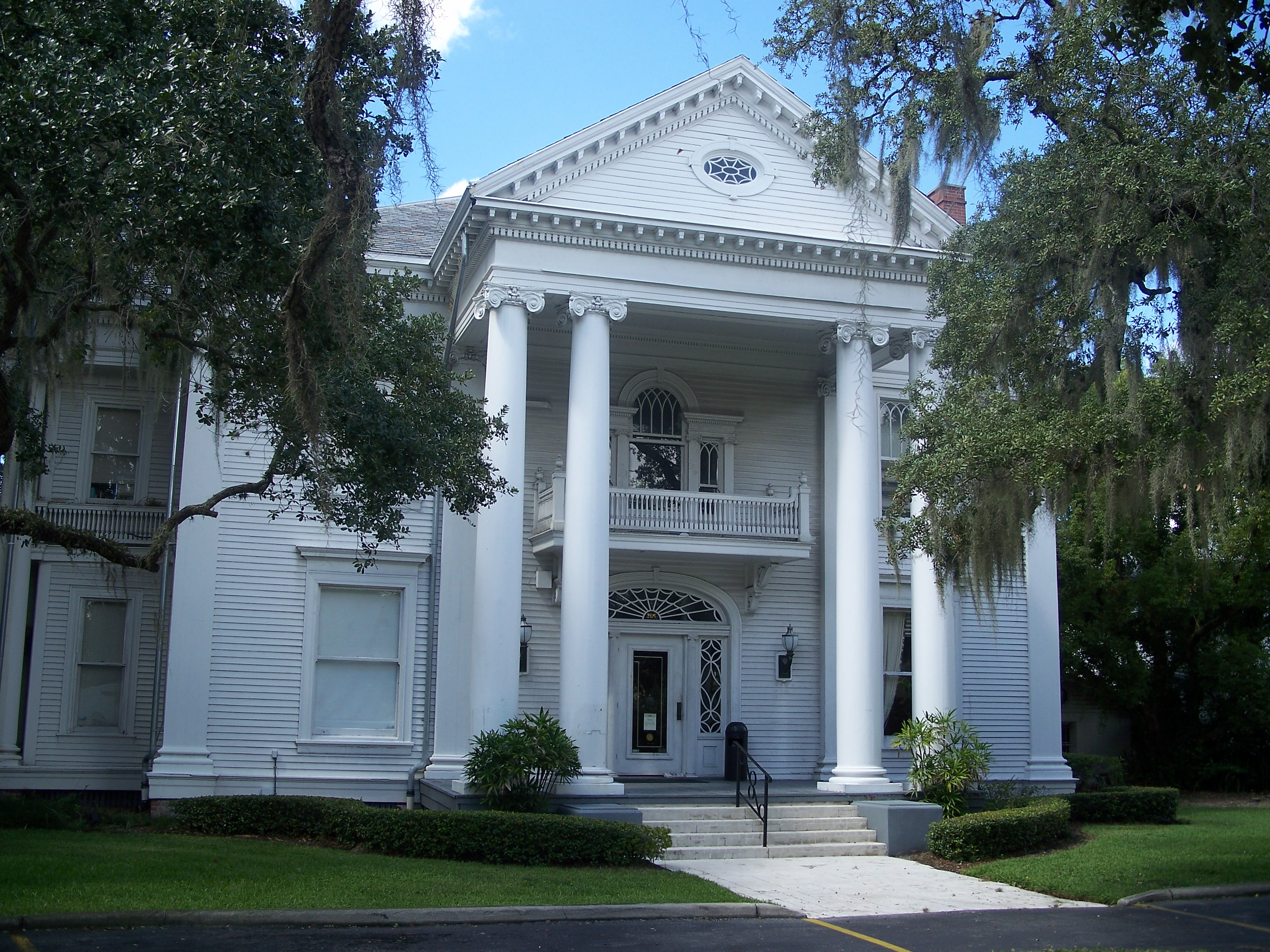

- Location within Florida Location within the United States
- Location: 305 S. Hyde Park, Tampa, Florida
- Coordinates: 27°56′28″N 82°27′52″W
- Area: less than one acre
- Built: 1890
- Architect: Grable, Weber & Groves
- Architectural style: Classical Revival
- NRHP reference No.: 74000638
- Added to NRHP: October 1, 1974

The T. C. Taliaferro House (also known as the Paul T. Ward House) is a historic home in Tampa, Florida. It is located at 305 South Hyde Park. It was built by architects Grable, Weber & Groves in the Classical Revival style in the late 19th century. It represents the height of style from 1875 to 1899.

On October 1, 1974, it was added to the U.S. National Register of Historic Places.

The building presently (2017) houses the Helen Gordon Davis Centre for Women.
