= S. H. Kress and Co. Building (Tampa, Florida) =

- U.S. National Register of Historic Places
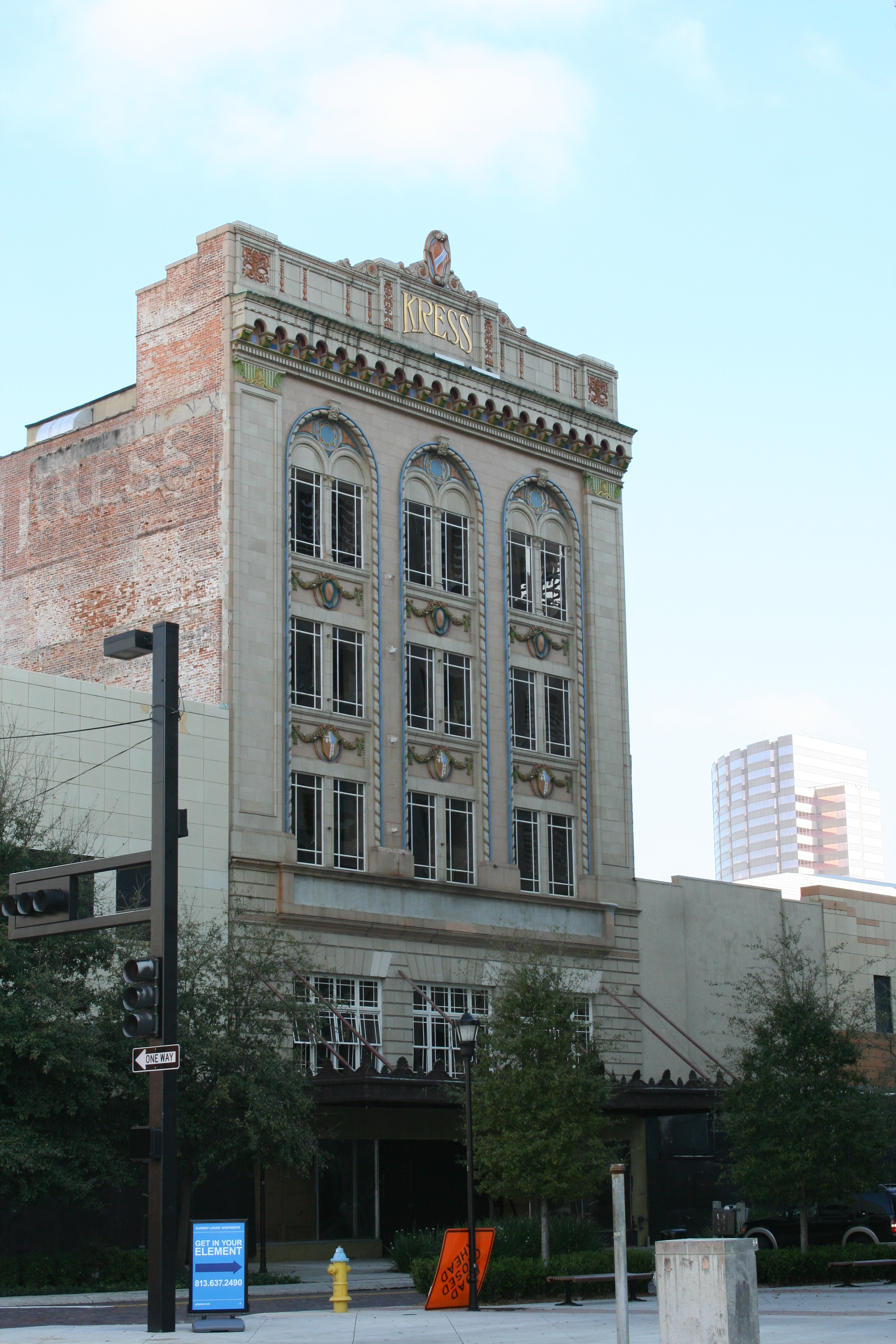
- S. H. Kress & Co. building in downtown Tampa

- Location within Florida Location within the United States
- Location: 811 N. Franklin St., Tampa, Florida
- Coordinates: 27°57′3″N 82°27′34″W
- Area: less than one acre
- Built: 1928
- Architect: G.E. Mackey
- NRHP reference No.: 83001424
- Added to NRHP: April 7, 1983

The S. H. Kress and Co. Building is a historic 1928 building in Tampa, Florida, United States. It was part of the S. H. Kress & Co. "five and dime" department store chain. The store closed in 1981, and has since remained vacant. on April 7, 1983, it was added to the U.S. National Register of Historic Places.

Located at 811 N. Franklin Street, the building has a second fronting on Florida Avenue and is in the Renaissance Revival architectural style. G.E. Mackey was the four-story building's architect, and it includes masonry, suspended bronze marquee, extensive use of terra-cotta ornamentation (on both of its facades). It was "one of the last major commercial structures built in Tampa before the Great Depression".

The Kress building is located between former Woolworth and J.J. Newberry stores, although the block is commonly known as the "Kress block." Lunch-counter sit-ins and protests at the block were held by civil rights activists at the Woolworth store in the 1960s to protest segregated lunch counters in Tampa. Today, there is a historical marker commemorating the movement.

== Attempts at Redevelopment ==
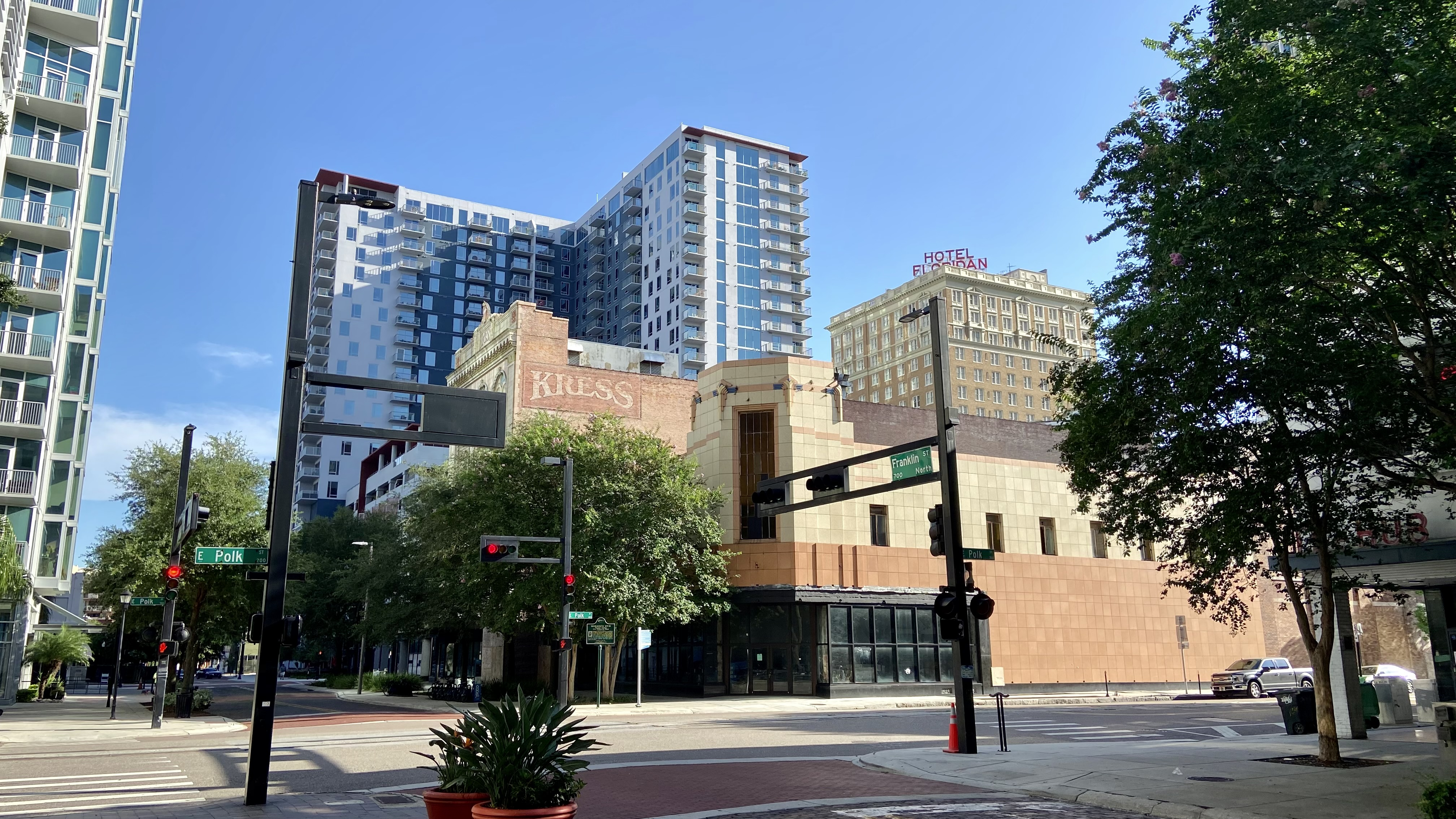
The former Woolworth building pictured on right, with Kress building behind it, and J.J. Newberry building at far left. Behind the block are the Floridan Palace Hotel and the Nine15 apartment complex.

Redevelopment plans for the Kress and the surrounding block date to at least 1987. Richard Wellhouse Stein planned to renovate the nearby structures to match the Kress façade, and add a nine-story atrium house nearly 200,000 square feet of office space.

Plans by the Doran Jason Group to demolish two of the buildings and replace them with a "massive" condo development were held off in 2006. The Kress building would have been used as a lobby with office and retail space.

In 2011, a fundraiser at the Kress building was cancelled due to the dispute over redevelopment plans.

The building was planned for social gatherings during the 2012 Republican Convention in Tampa, although the RNC kept details about the gathering secret.

In 2014, plans for renovation and a 24-story addition and conversion of the block into a hotel were proposed, then scrapped.

The block, including the Kress building, was purchased in 2017 by the Wilson Company, a Tampa-based property management firm. Statements at the time of purchase indicate plans to preserve, renovate, and redevelop the block.

== Gallery ==
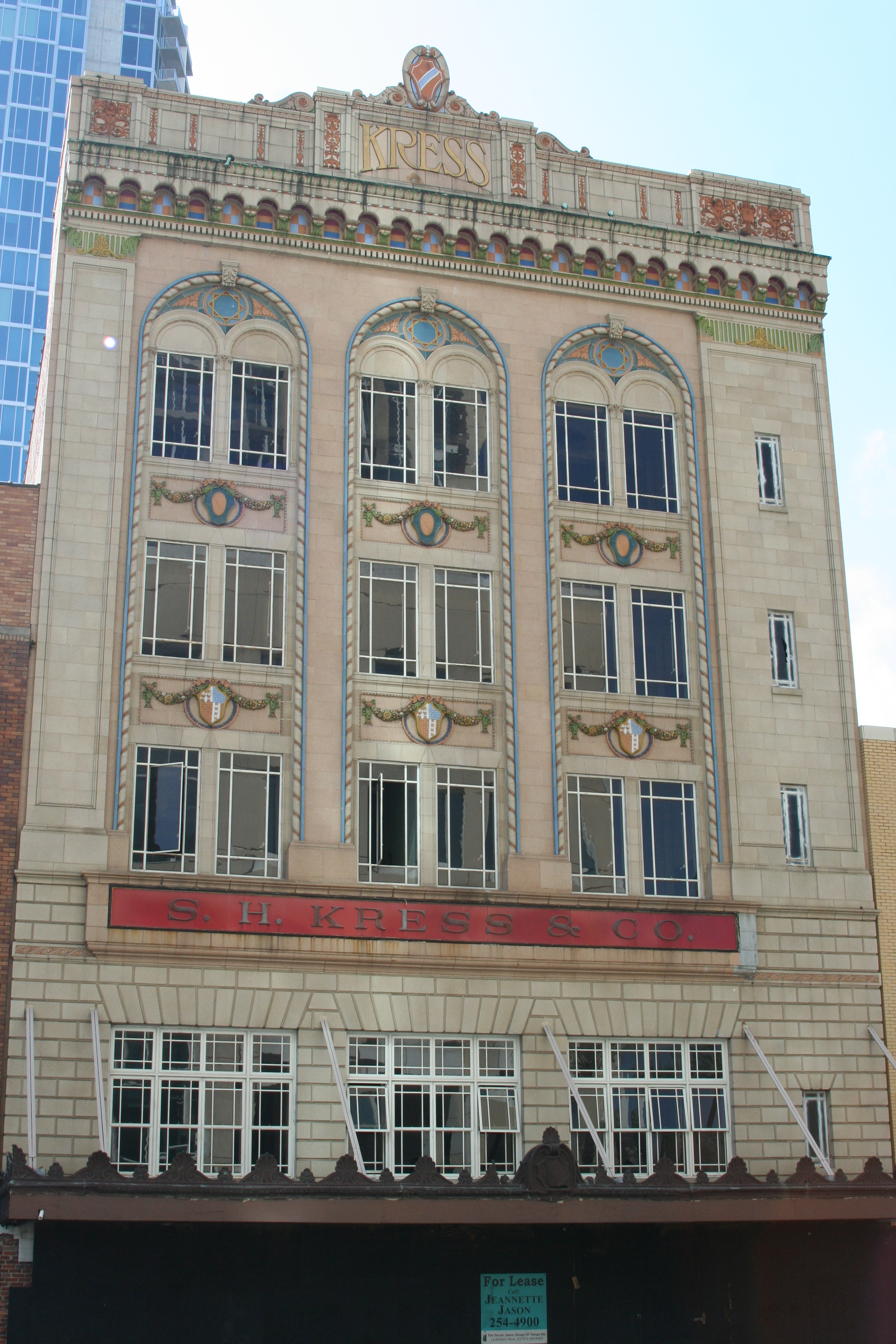
Kress building

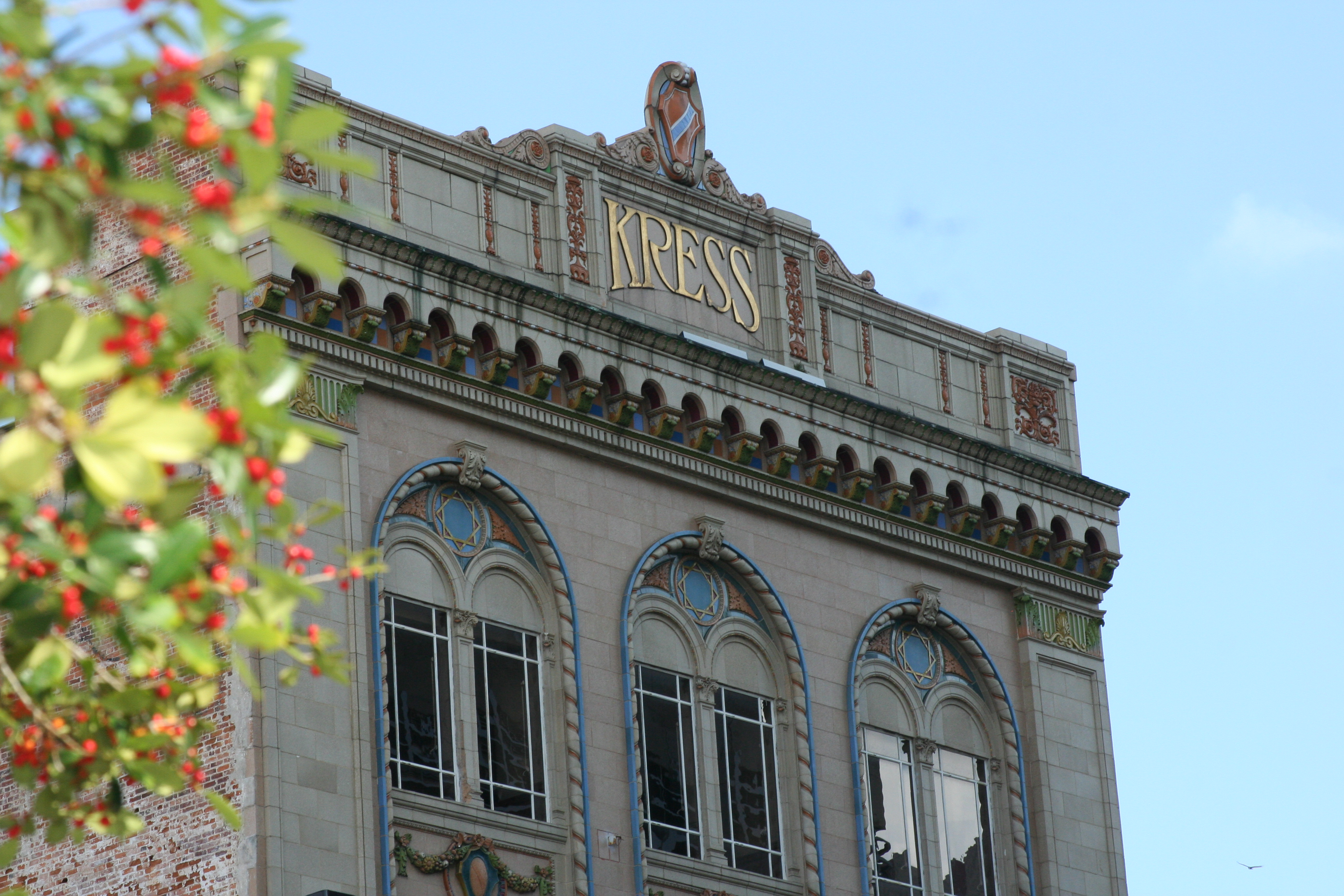
Roofline of Kress building

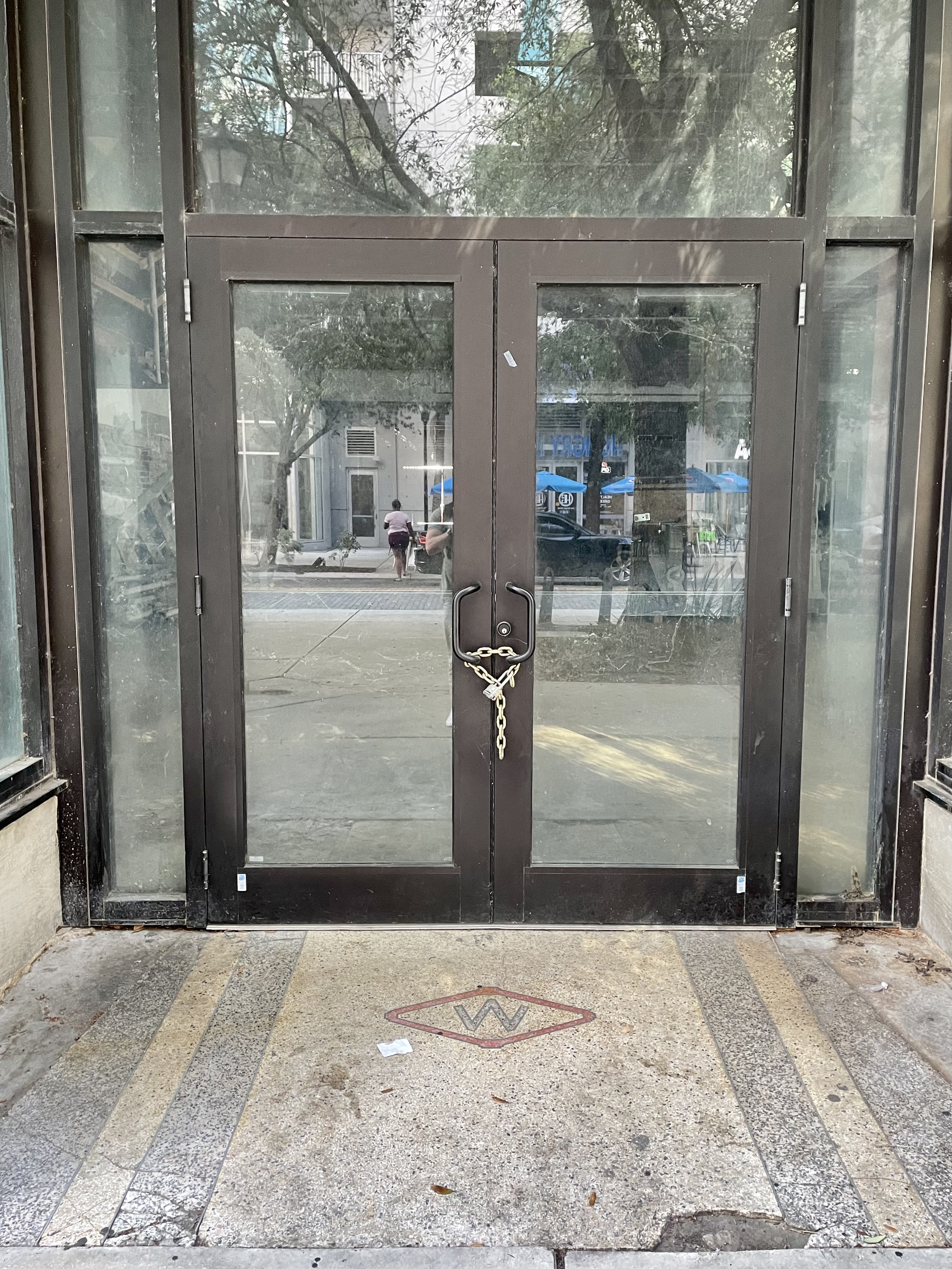
Woolworth stonework (May 2021)

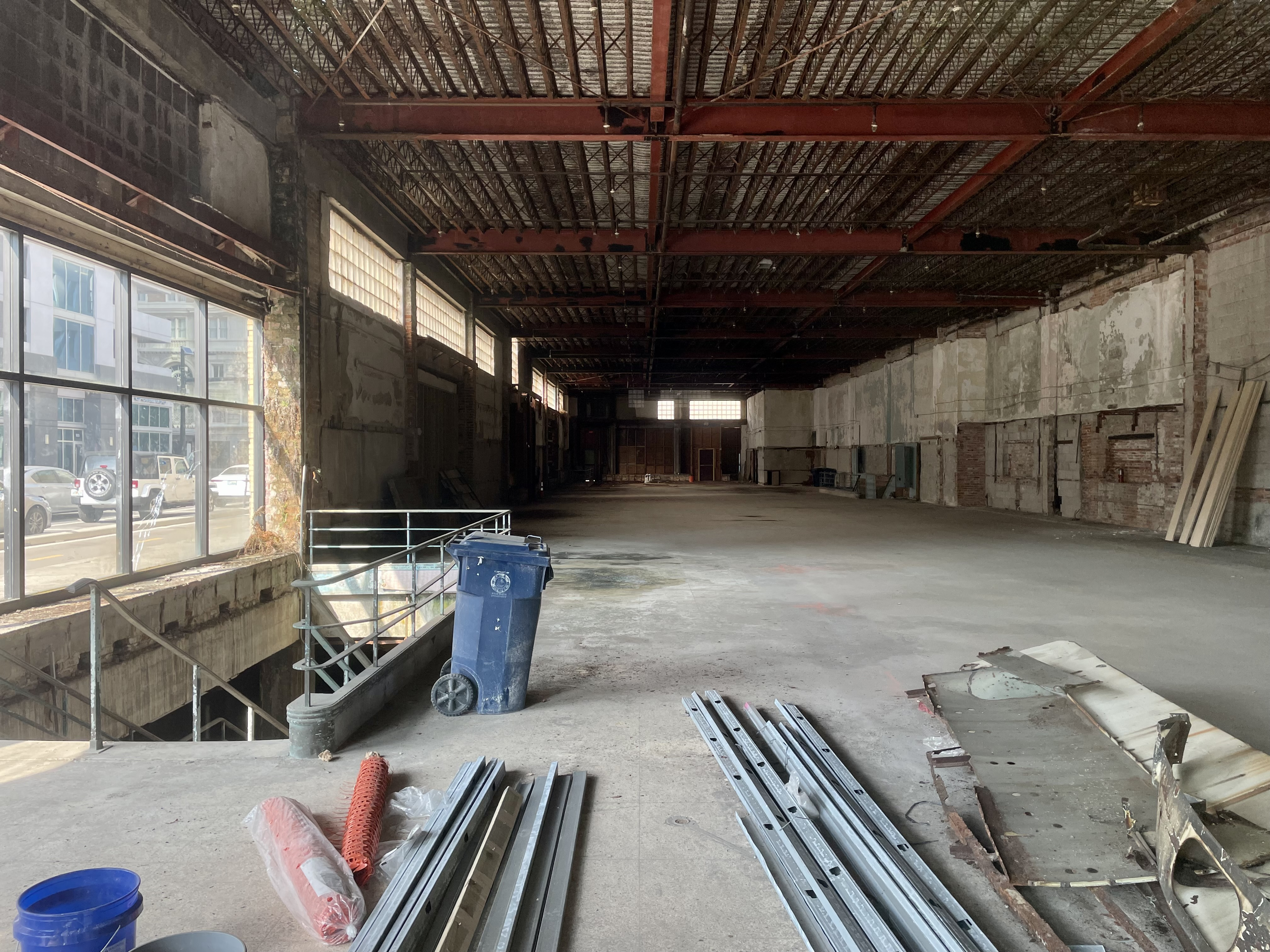
Inside J.J. Newberry Building (May 2021)

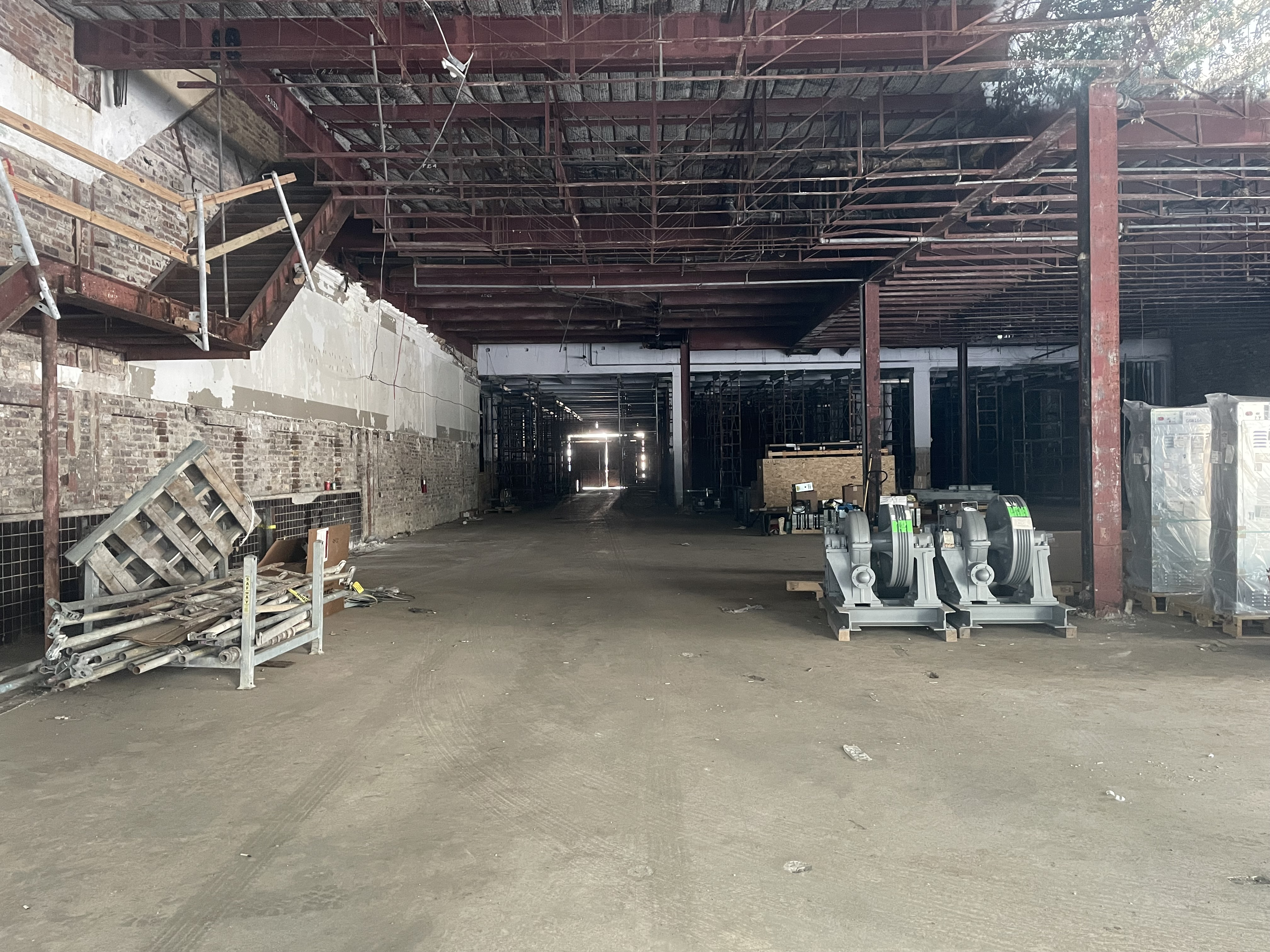
Inside Woolworth Building (May 2021)

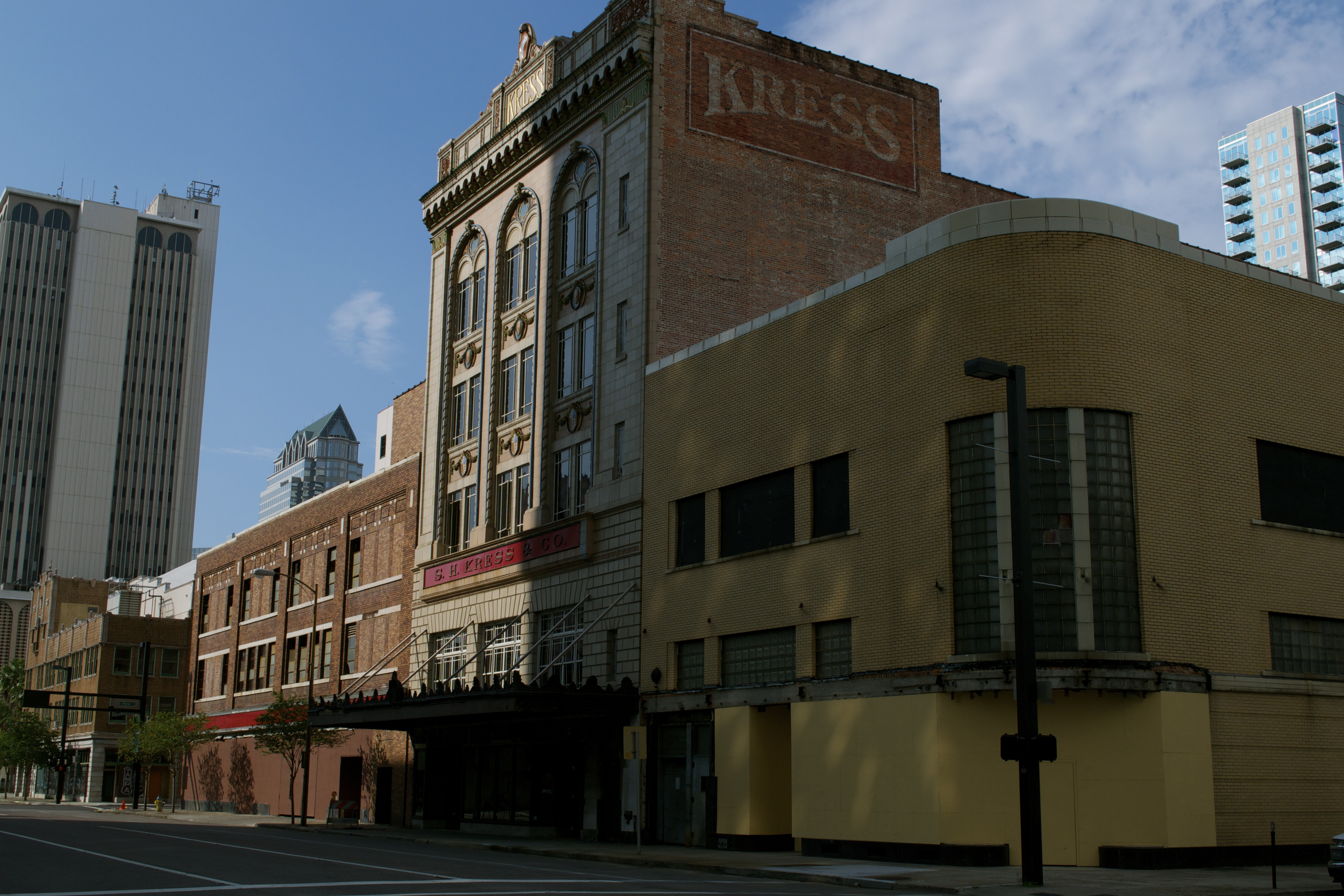
Kress block

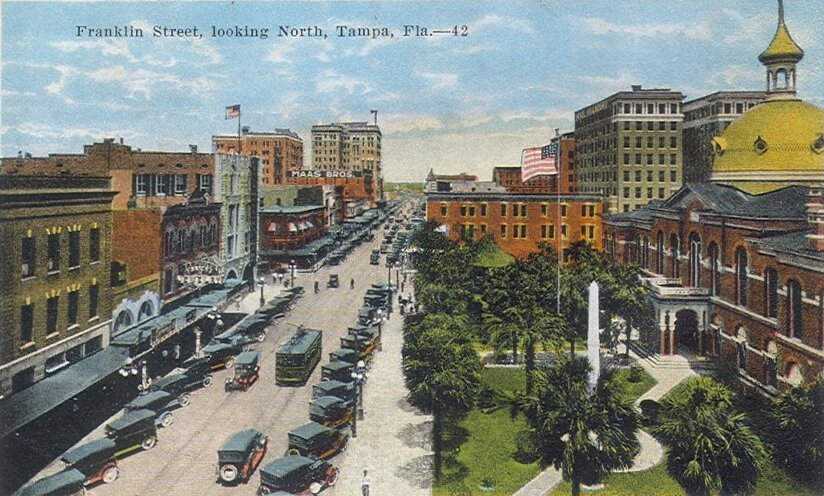
Historical postcard showing the Kress Block (back left).

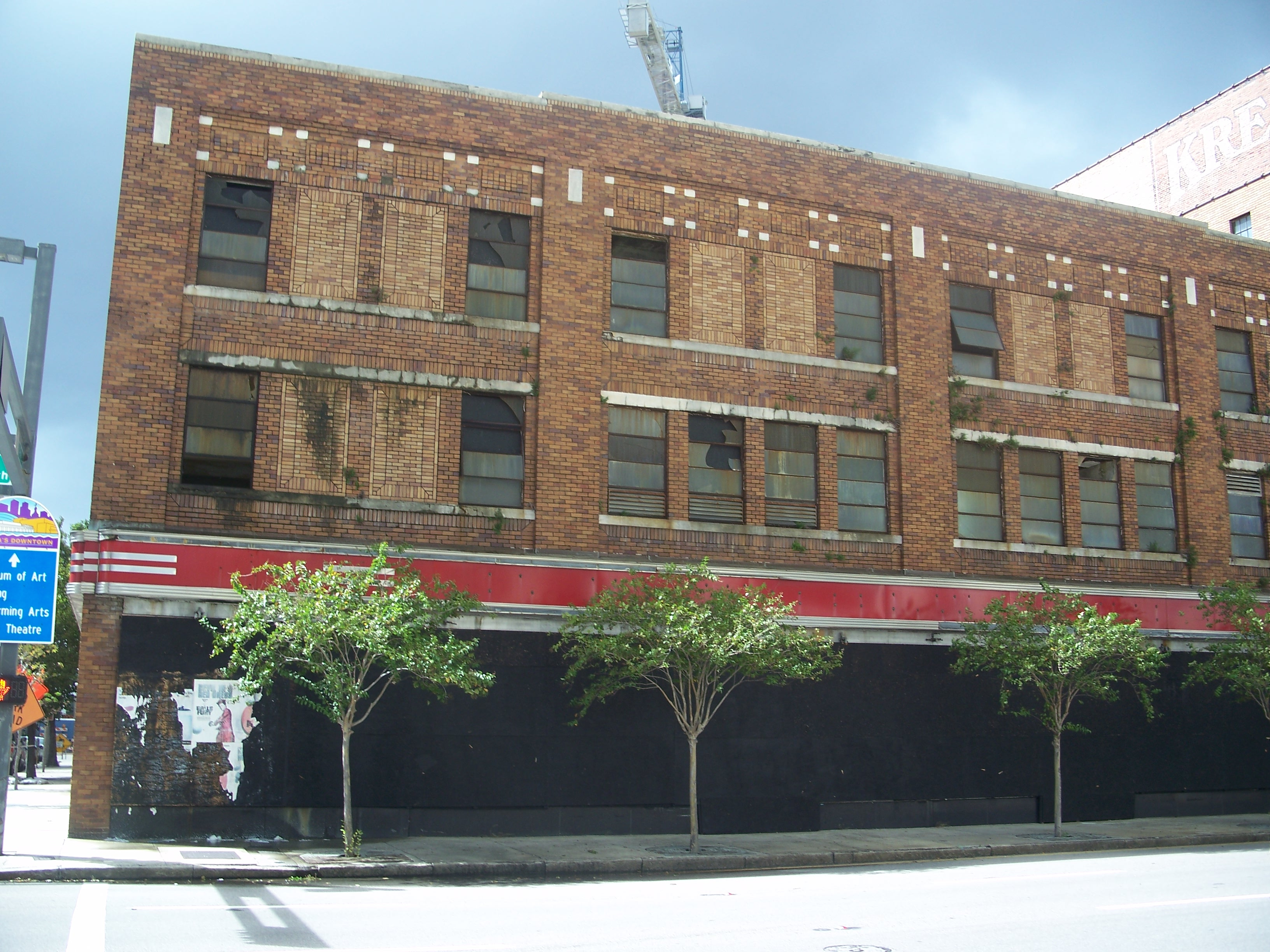
Rear-side of Woolworth building on the Kress block

== Additional sources and external links ==
- Hillsborough County listings at National Register of Historic Places
- Florida's Office of Cultural and Historical Programs
  - Hillsborough County listings at Florida's Office of Cultural and Historical Programs
  - Kress Building
- Tampa's Kress building history
