= Horace T. Robles House =

Historic house in Florida, United States

- U.S. National Register of Historic Places
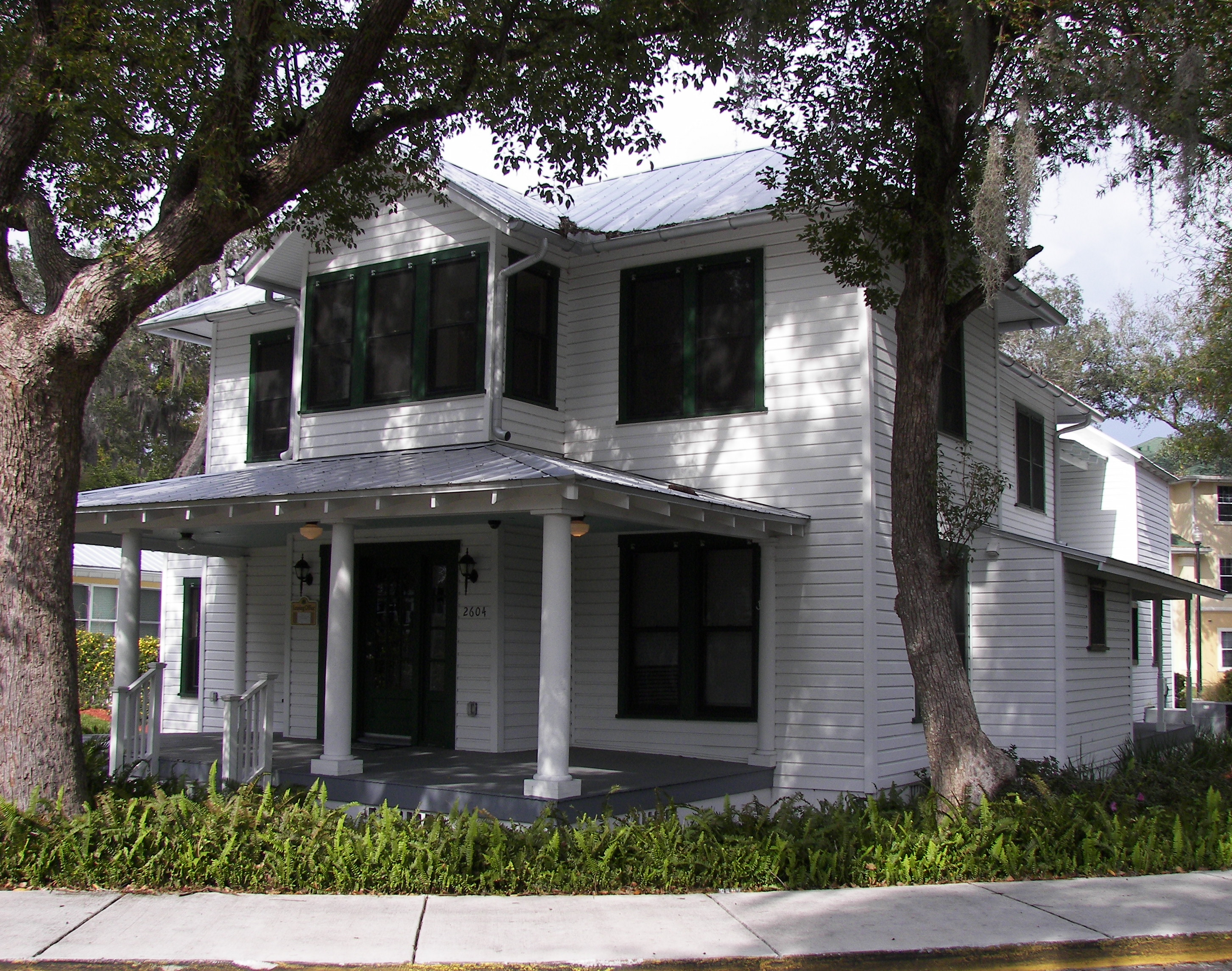

- Location within Florida Location within the United States
- Location: Tampa, Florida, United States
- Coordinates: 28°0′14.25″N 82°25′48.75″W
- NRHP reference No.: 06000091
- Added to NRHP: March 2, 2006

The Horace T. Robles House is a historic U.S. home in Tampa, Florida. It is located at 2604 East Hanna Avenue. On March 2, 2006, it was added to the U.S. National Register of Historic Places. The house currently functions as the leasing office for an apartment complex.

The house was built circa 1888 as a farmhouse in the vernacular style. The interior has rooms of irregular plan and size, suggesting that the house may have started as a simple two- or three-room structure and was expanded to its present configuration. Despite the randomness of the rooms, it has a symmetrical front gable entry with a full-width porch, supported by Tuscan columns and classical pilasters. This indicates some influence from the "Free Classic" variation of the Queen Anne style. The house was relocated approximately 60 feet (18 m) eastward in 1961 to accommodate the construction of a church, but otherwise it maintains its historical integrity. The house appears to have been built by its owner, Horace Theodore Robles, who was a dairy farmer and cattle rancher. The design indicates that a lay builder, rather than an architect, designed the house. It also appears to have been constructed in stages over a number of years.
