= Luigi Guida =

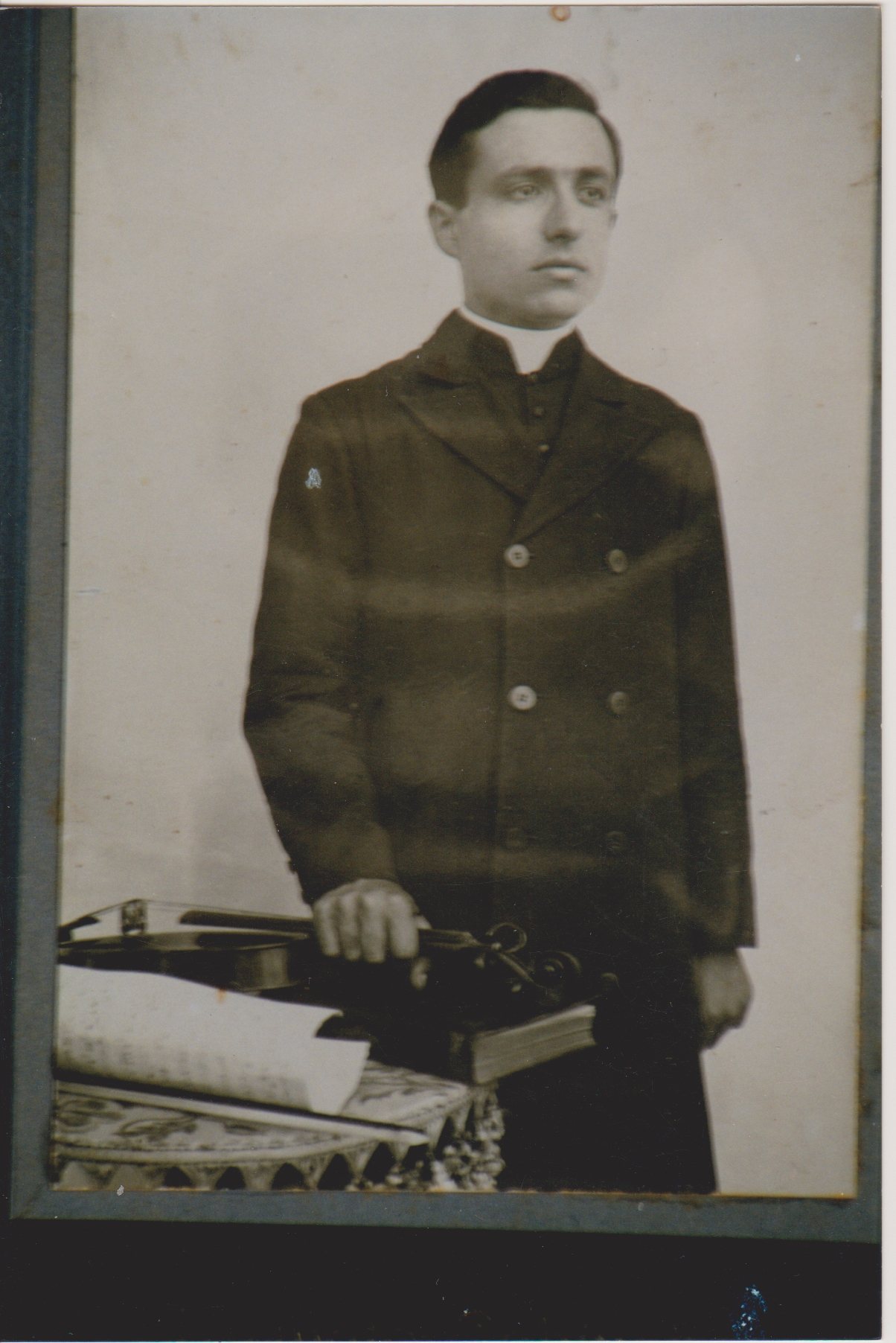
Don Luigi posing for a photograph with his violin.

Luigi Guida (1883 in Vico Equense – 1951) was an Italian composer, pianist, organist, and conductor. He wrote church music as part of the Cecilian Movement. He also wrote salon songs.

== Recordings ==
- Mistica songs and solo sacred arias Candida Guida, Eufemia Manfredi CD Nova Antiqua, DDD, 2022
