= Upper North Franklin Street Commercial District =

Historic district in Florida, United States

- U.S. National Register of Historic Places
- U.S. Historic district
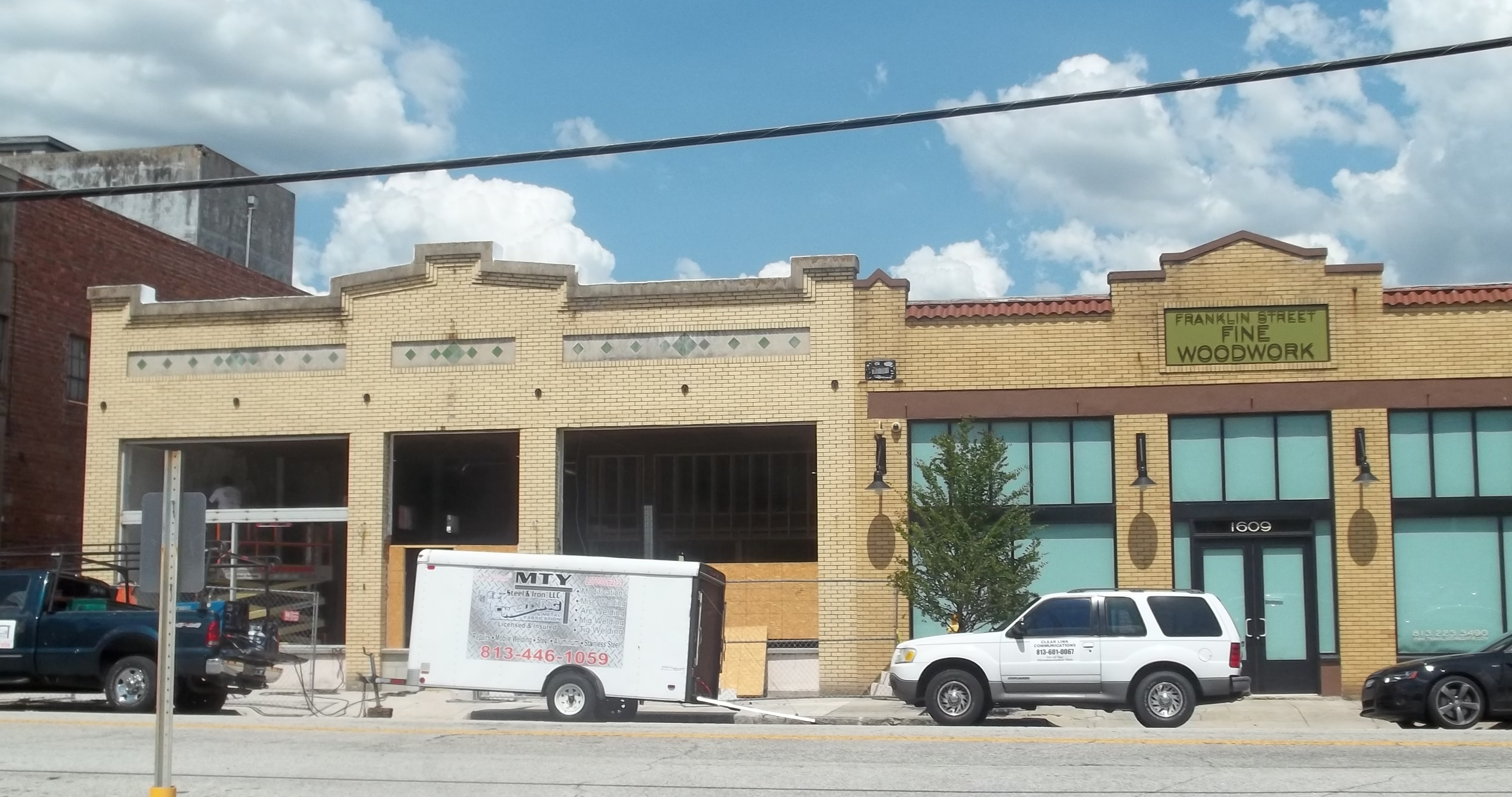
- Redevelopment of underused and abandoned historic buildings on North Franklin, 2011

- Location within Florida Location within the United States
- Location: Bounded by E Oak Ave, N Florida Ave, Kay St, & N Tampa St, Tampa, Florida
- Coordinates: 27.95954°N 82.46019°W
- Area: 12 acres (4.9 ha)
- Built: 1915
- Architect: James, Fred; Kennard, Francis J.
- Architectural style: Late 19th And 20th Century Revivals, Modern Movement
- NRHP reference No.: 10000344
- Added to NRHP: June 9, 2010

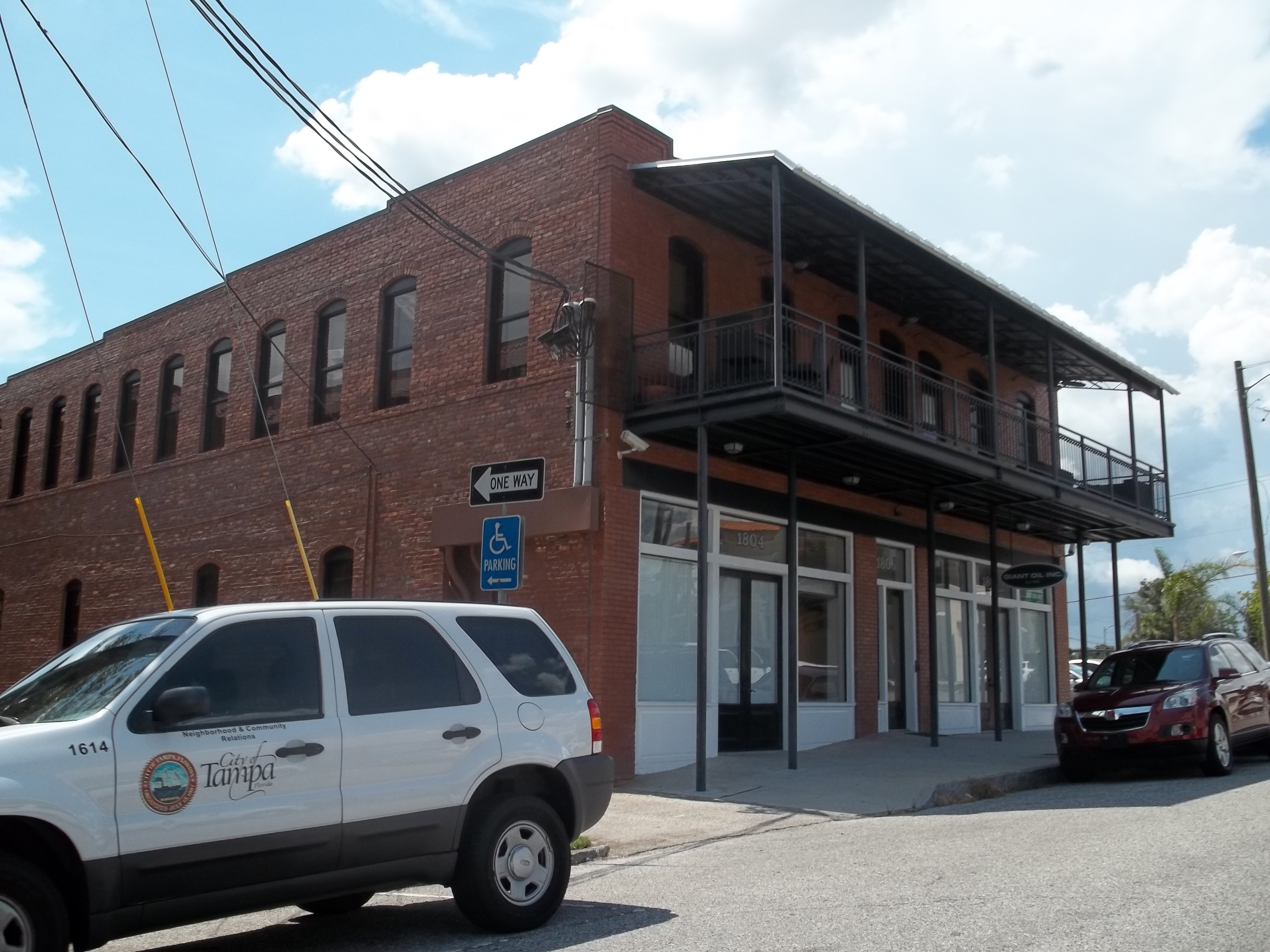
Brick building on North Franklin

Upper North Franklin Street Commercial District is a historic neighborhood in Tampa, Florida listed on the National Register of Historic Places listings in Hillsborough County, Florida. The area includes the Cafe Hey coffee shop, the Old Tampa Carnegie Free Library, (now a city office building), and the Rialto Theatre (Tampa) built in 1925 and now vacant.

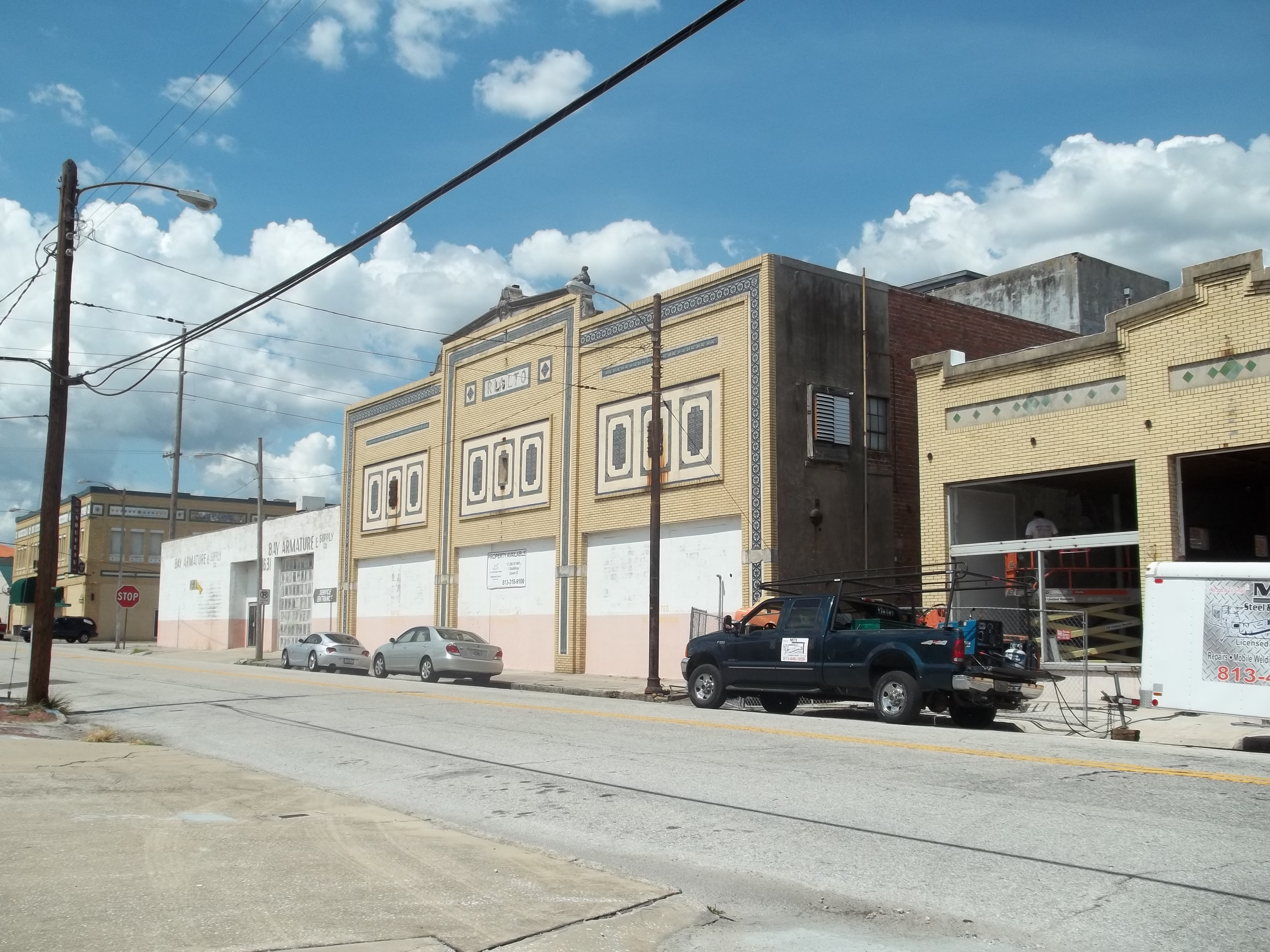
Rialto Theatre building

The Arlington Hotel and Fly Bar have reinvigorated the national historic district. Other listed areas of the city include Tampa Heights, Seminole Heights, Ybor City, Hyde Park, Hampton Terrace, West Tampa and properties on Davis Island.
