= D. W. Waters Career Center =

- Old Hillsborough County High School
- U.S. National Register of Historic Places
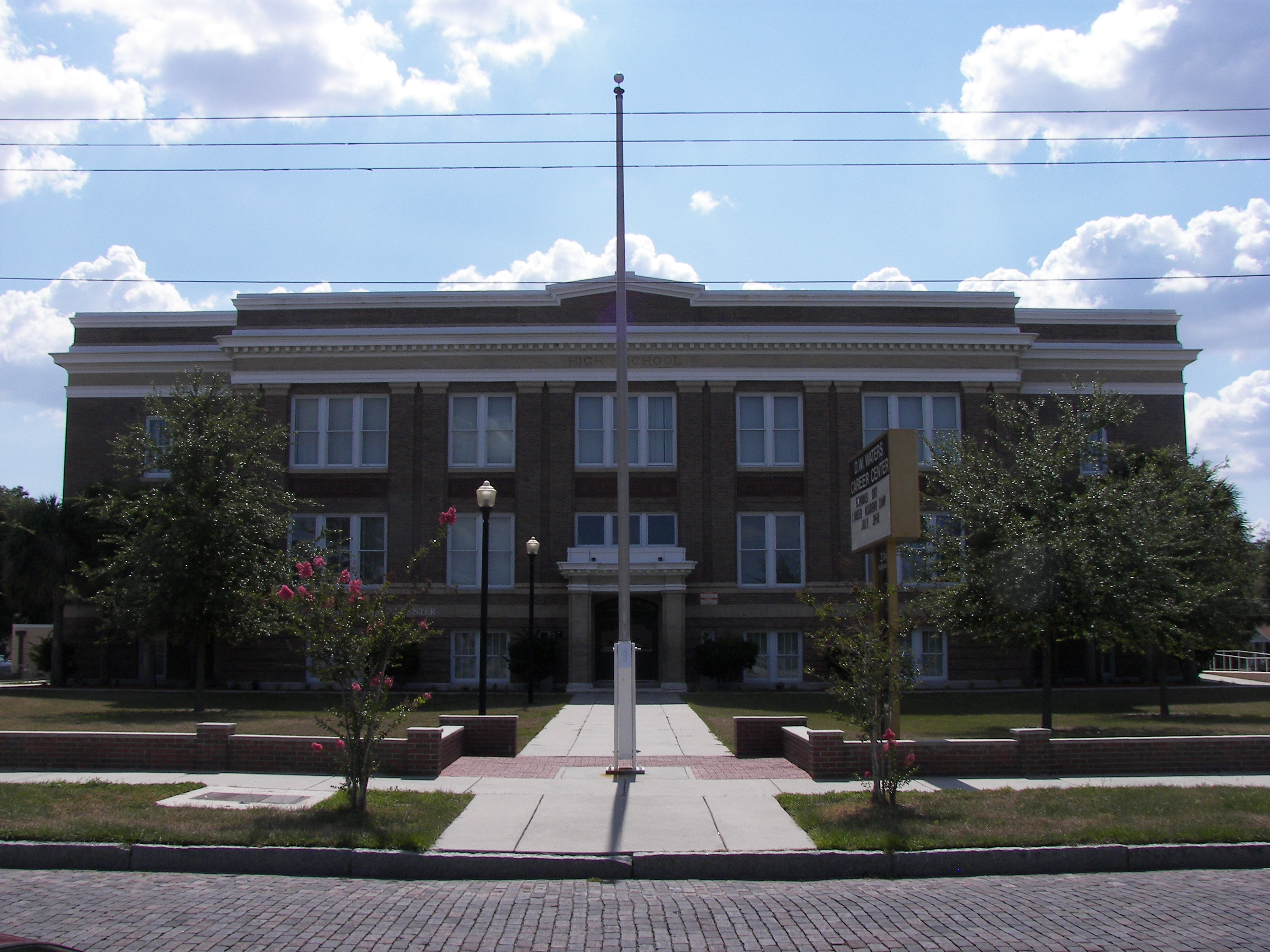
- Old HCHS building, now the D.W. Waters Center

- Location within Florida Location within the United States
- Location: 2704 North Highland Avenue; Tampa, Florida
- Coordinates: 27°58′5″N 82°27′47″W
- Built: 1911
- Architect: William Potter; M. Leo Elliott (1920 addition)
- Website: https://www.hillsboroughschools.org/o/dwwaters
- NRHP reference No.: 07000423
- Added to NRHP: May 15, 2007

The D. W. Waters Career Center is a magnet high school located in Tampa, Florida. On May 15, 2007, it was added to the U.S. National Register of Historic Places as the Old Hillsborough County High School.

Built in the city's Tampa Heights neighborhood in 1911 at a cost of $60,000, the old Hillsborough County High School building served what was then the county's only high school. Architect William Potter designed the three-story masonry block building as a closed rectangle with an open center (since then it has been almost entirely filled). This was the third campus in the school's history and remained its home until 1928, when Hillsborough High School moved to its fourth and current campus ("County" was dropped from the name as by then the county had built an additional high school, Henry B. Plant High School).

The building has served other schools since then, including Jefferson High School, which was founded there in 1939 and called the building home until 1967. The school had a large Hispanic and Italian population due to students who were from the Latino communities of Ybor City and West Tampa. After that it housed the former George Washington Junior High School until that institution was closed in 1979.

Today the historic building continues its educational use as the home of D.W. Waters Career Center, a Hillsborough County Public Schools center for 11th grade and 12th grade students which focuses on occupational training. It benefited from a major restoration in 2003.

== See also ==
- Hillsborough High School (Tampa, Florida)
