= Jesse Carter (Florida politician) =

American politician

Jesse Carter was an American state legislator, mail contractor, and state militia officer in Tampa, Florida, as well as a school co-founder. He was a Democrat.

Carter was a commanding officer dealing with "Indian disturbances". As a state official, he was involved with provisioning Tampa during the Seminole Wars. He represented the 11th Senatorial District.

Carter's home was where the University of Tampa is now located. He built a schoolhouse for his daughter.
