= Jackson Rooming House =

Historic residential building in Florida, United States

- U.S. National Register of Historic Places
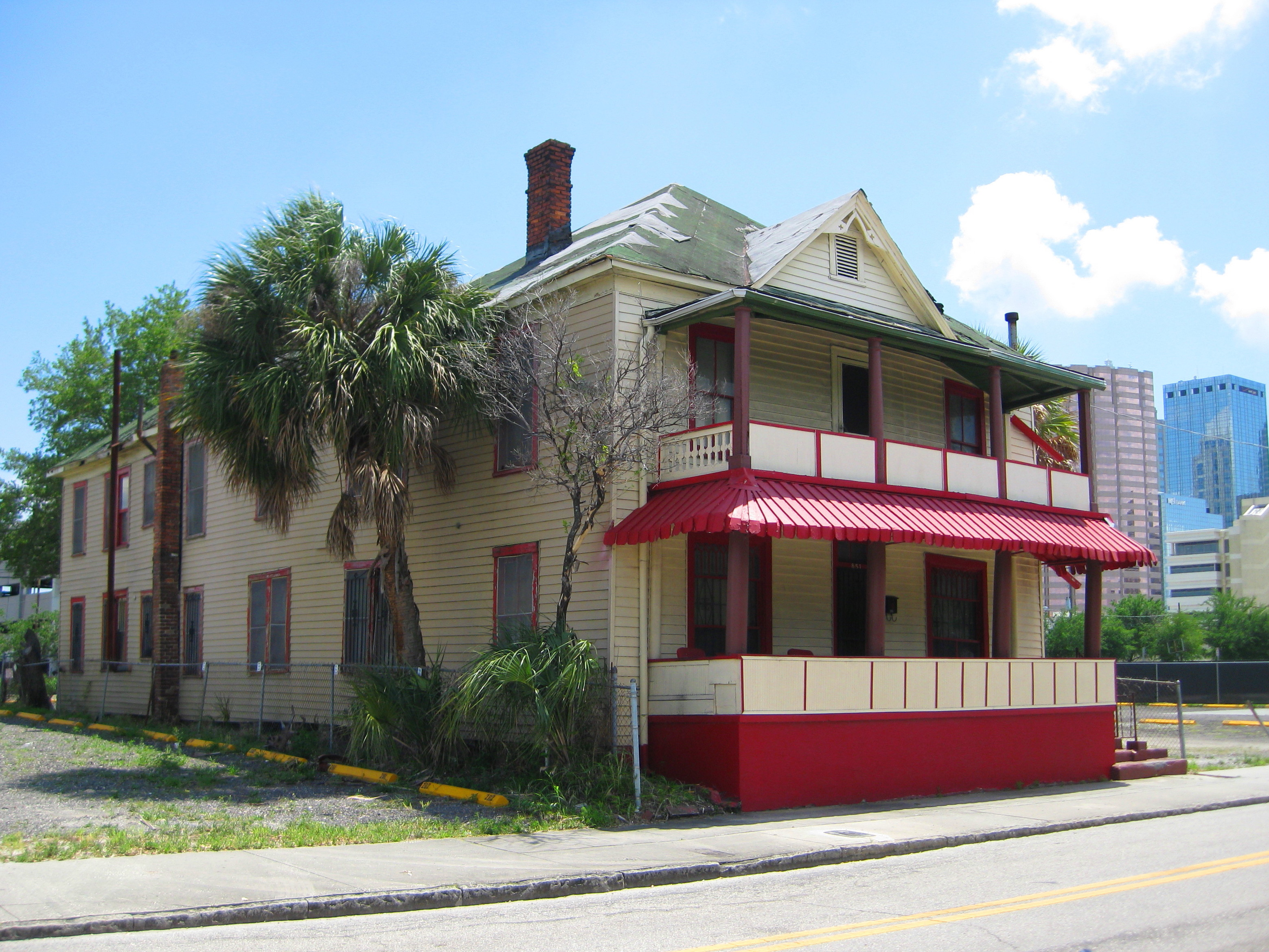
- The Jackson House viewed from Zack Street in 2010

- Location within Florida Location within the United States
- Location: 851 Zack Street; Tampa; Hillsborough County; Florida; USA
- Coordinates: 27°57′08″N 82°27′07″W
- Built: 1901 - original structure (additional rooms, 2nd floor, added later)
- Architectural style: Frame Vernacular
- NRHP reference No.: 07000112
- Added to NRHP: March 7, 2007

The Jackson Rooming House, also known as Jackson House, is a historic building constructed in 1901 as a boarding house in the city of Tampa, in the U.S. state of Florida. It provided accommodations to African-Americans and other travelers of African descent during the era of racial segregation. It is located on the north end of downtown at 851 Zack Street, approximately one block west of Tampa Union Station. On March 7, 2007, it was added to the U.S. National Register of Historic Places (NRHP).

== History ==
The Jackson Rooming House was one of the only places in Tampa where black travelers could find lodging, as they were not accepted in standard hotels of the day. The 24-room establishment began as a six-room cottage built by Moses and Sarah Jackson in 1901. Soon after, they added bedrooms and a second story in order to operate the rooming house, which remained in business until 1989. The Jacksons' children inherited the business and the home remains in the possession of one of the Jacksons' grandchildren.

During its time the Jackson House played host to several prominent entertainers, including Count Basie, Cab Calloway, James Brown, Ella Fitzgerald, and Ray Charles. Acts such as these would come to play the nightclubs of Tampa's black business district, which thrived nearby along Central Avenue until the 1960s.

During the urban renewal of the 1970s most of the neighborhood surrounding the house was razed. By 2007, when the house was added to the NRHP, the Jackson House was believed to be the last free-standing residential dwelling in downtown Tampa.

== Restoration efforts ==
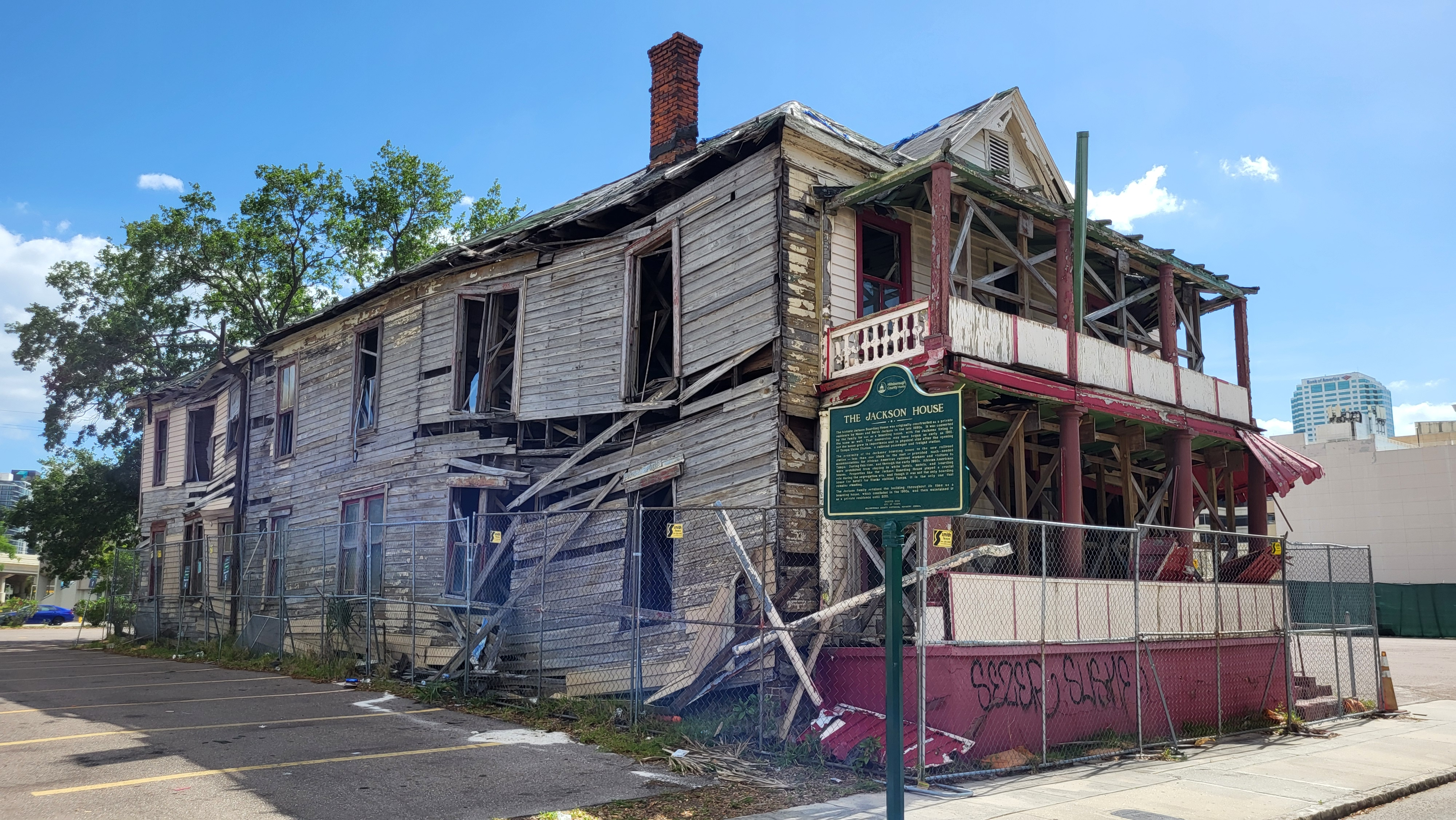
The Jackson Rooming House in 2025

In 2013, the Jackson House was deemed too damaged to be restored and faced likely demolition. In 2013, efforts were being made to save the historic Rooming House from demolition by the City of Tampa. As of January 13, 2014, Todd Alan Clem, commonly known as Bubba the Love Sponge, planned to purchase this property and begin the restoration of the house. Soon afterwards, Clem withdrew plans blaming mayor Bob Buckhorn and city officials. The Jackson House Foundation estimates that it will cost about $1 million to restore the building.

In 2022 the foundation had raised $3 million in pledges in order to restore the property, including $1 million from Tampa Bay Lightning owner Jeff Vinik. However, the foundation reported that in order to continue construction they would need to reach an agreement with the owners of the neighboring parking lot, 717 Parking, to allow 10-foot easements for fire code standards After a year of negotiations, 717 continued to deny the Jackson foundation access to the property needed.

In October 2023 the Tampa City Council voted in favor of a land swap deal with 717 Parking. But by February 2024 the agreement between 717 and the Jackson House Foundation had yet to be settled with no clear indication for the delay.
