= George Guida Sr. House =

Historic house in Florida, United States

- Guida, George Sr. House
- U.S. National Register of Historic Places
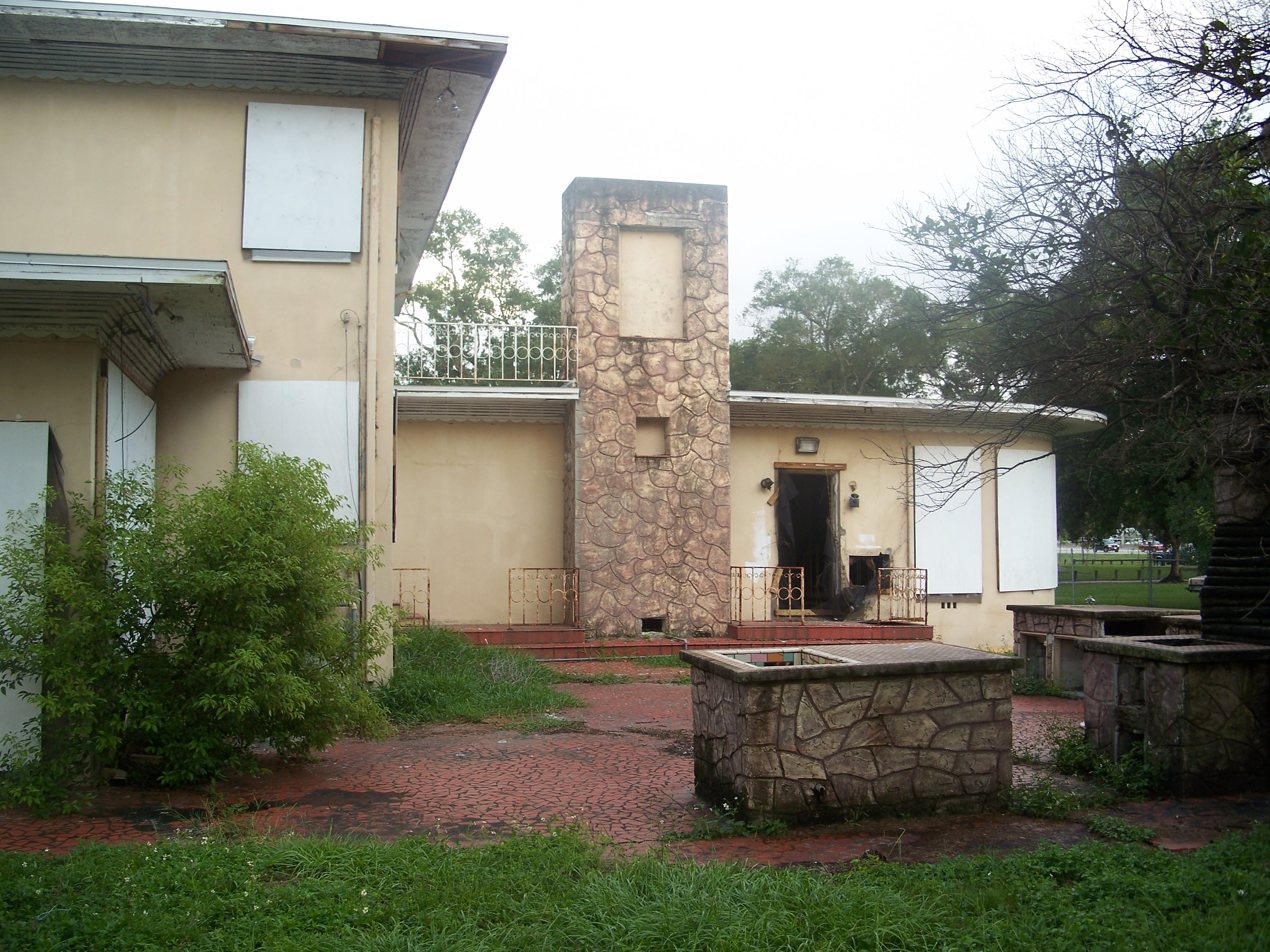

- Location within Florida Location within the United States
- Location: Tampa, Florida, United States
- Coordinates: 27°57′31″N 82°29′49″W
- Architectural style: Moderne
- NRHP reference No.: 06000193
- Added to NRHP: March 29, 2006

The George Guida Sr. House is a historic U.S. home in Tampa, Florida. It is located at 1516 North Renfrew Avenue. On March 29, 2006, it was added to the U.S. National Register of Historic Places.

The two-story 4,500 square foot home was a center of social life in West Tampa. It had a heart shaped drive. Concerns have been raised over maintenance and use of the city owned property.
