= Old People's Home (Tampa, Florida) =

- U.S. National Register of Historic Places
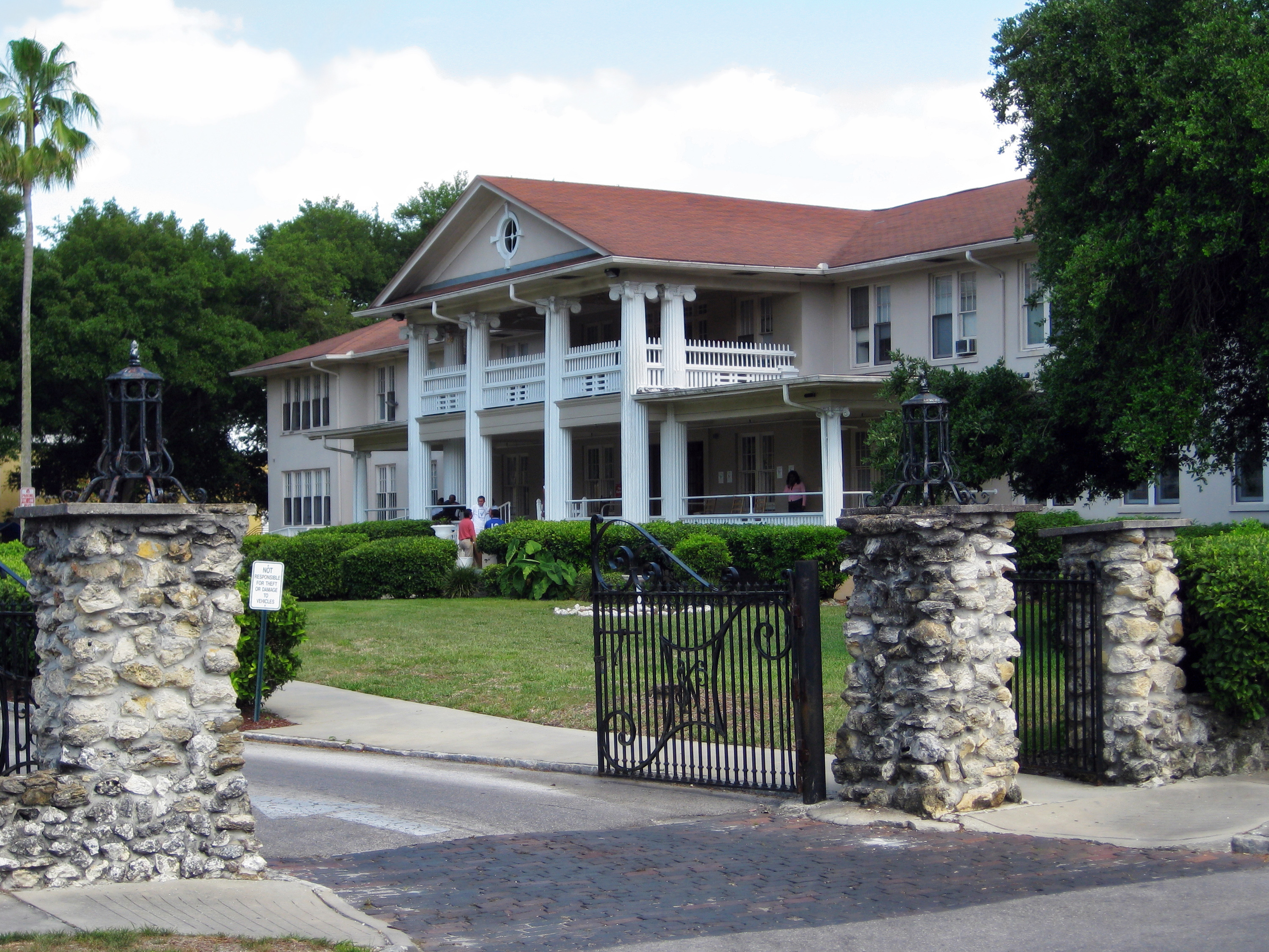
- The Old People's Home

- Location within Florida Location within the United States
- Location: 1203 East 22nd Avenue; Tampa, Florida
- Coordinates: 27°58′15″N 82°26′47″W
- Area: 4 acres (1.6 ha)
- Built: 1924
- Architects: Winn, Frank A., Jr., et al. Johnson, A.H.
- Architectural style: Colonial Revival
- NRHP reference No.: 00001198
- Added to NRHP: October 17, 2000

The Old People's Home (also known as The Home Association) is a historic building in the V.M. Ybor neighborhood of Tampa, Florida. It is located at 1203 East 22nd Avenue. On October 17, 2000, it was added to the U.S. National Register of Historic Places.

Built in 1924, the two story, Colonial Revival style building with a grand, columned portico along the main facade was primarily designed by Frank A. Winn, Jr. and A.H. Johnson. It was Tampa's first privately supported and purpose-built home for the care of the elderly and represented a major civic achievement for the community. The building is set on a 4.5-acre (18,000 m^{2}) site which features several stately oak trees.

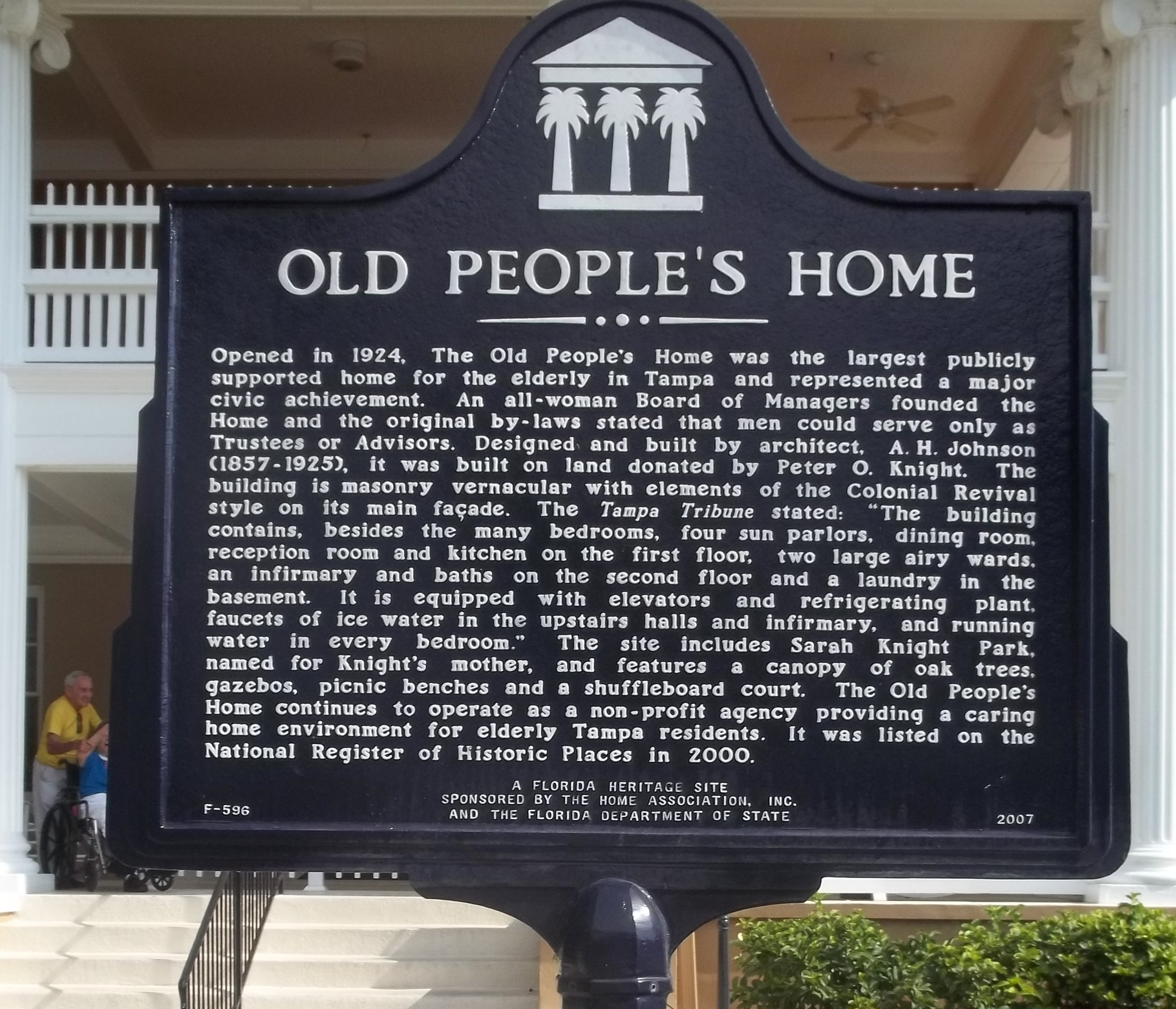
Florida Historical Site marker

The building continues to operate as a residential elder-care facility per its original intent as The Home Association, Inc., a not-for-profit Senior Skilled Nursing Facility.
