= Morton =

Morton may refer to:

== People ==
- Morton (surname)
- Morton (given name)

== Fictional ==
- Morton Koopa, Jr., one of the Koopalings in the Mario franchise
- A character in the Charlie and Lola franchise
- A character in the 2008 film Horton Hears a Who!
- Morton Slumber, a funeral director who assists the diamond smuggling ring in Diamonds Are Forever
- Morton "Mort" Rainey, an author and the main character of the 2004 film Secret Window

== Places ==
=== Canada ===
- Rural Municipality of Morton, Manitoba, a former rural municipality
- Morton, Ontario, a community in Rideau Lakes

=== England ===
- Morton, Cumberland, Cumbria
- Morton, Westmorland and Furness, Cumbria
- Morton, Derbyshire
- Morton, Gloucestershire
- Morton, Isle of Wight
- Morton, a village in Morton and Hanthorpe parish, Lincolnshire
- Morton, West Lindsey, Lincolnshire
- Morton Hall, Lincolnshire
- Morton, Norfolk (or Morton on the Hill)
- Morton, Nottinghamshire
- Morton-on-Swale, North Yorkshire
- Morton, Shropshire, a location in Oswestry Rural parish, Shropshire
- Morton, West Yorkshire, a parish
- Murton Grange, North Yorkshire

=== Scotland ===
- Morton, Dumfries and Galloway, a civil parish
- Morton Castle, a seat of the Earls of Morton in Dumfries and Galloway, Scotland
- Morton, West Lothian

=== United States ===
- Morton, Illinois, a village
- Morton, Indiana, an unincorporated community
- Morton, Minnesota, a city
- Morton, Mississippi, a city
- Morton, Missouri, an unincorporated community
- Morton, New York
- Morton, Philadelphia, Pennsylvania, a neighborhood
- Morton, Pennsylvania, a borough
- Morton, Texas, a city
- Morton, Washington, a city
- Lake Morton-Berrydale, Washington, an unincorporated community
- Morton, Wyoming, an unincorporated community
- Morton Arboretum, a large plant collection in Lisle, Illinois
- Lake Morton (Florida), a lake in Florida
- Lake Morton (Washington), a lake in Washington
- Morton Township (disambiguation)
- Morton County (disambiguation)
- Camp Morton, an American Civil War military training ground and prisoner-of-war camp in Indianapolis, Indiana

=== Elsewhere ===
- Morton Strait, Antarctica
- Morton National Park, New South Wales, Australia
- Morton, Vienne, France, a commune

== Businesses ==
- Morton Frozen Foods
- Morton's Potato Chips, an American company in the 1960s and 1970s
- Morton's Restaurant Group, owner and operator of upscale restaurants, including Morton's The Steakhouse
- Morton Salt
- Morton (restaurant), a Finnish restaurant chain

== Schools ==
- Morton College, a community college in Cicero, Illinois
- Morton High School (disambiguation)

== Titles ==
- Earl of Morton, a title in the Peerage of Scotland
- Morton baronets, a title in the Baronetage of England

== Other uses ==
- Greenock Morton F.C., a Scottish football club
- Morton Stadium, Santry, Dublin, Ireland
- Morton station, a SEPTA Regional Rail station in Morton, Pennsylvania
- USS Morton, a US Navy destroyer
- Ulmus 'Morton', a variety of elm tree that originated at the Morton Arboretum
- Morton's neuroma, a medical condition affecting the foot

== See also ==
- Moreton (disambiguation)
- USS General C. G. Morton (AP-138), a transport ship
