= Lake Morton =

Lake Morton may refer to:

- Lake Morton (Florida), a lake in Lakeland, Polk County, Florida
- Lake Morton (Washington), a lake in King County, Washington
- Lake Morton-Berrydale, Washington, a census-designated place in King County, Washington
