= Franklin O. Adams =

American architect (1881-1967)

- Born: June 6, 1881 near Waterproof, Louisiana
- Died: November 27, 1967 (aged 86); Tampa, Florida
- Occupation: Architect
- Awards: Fellow, American Institute of Architects (1940)

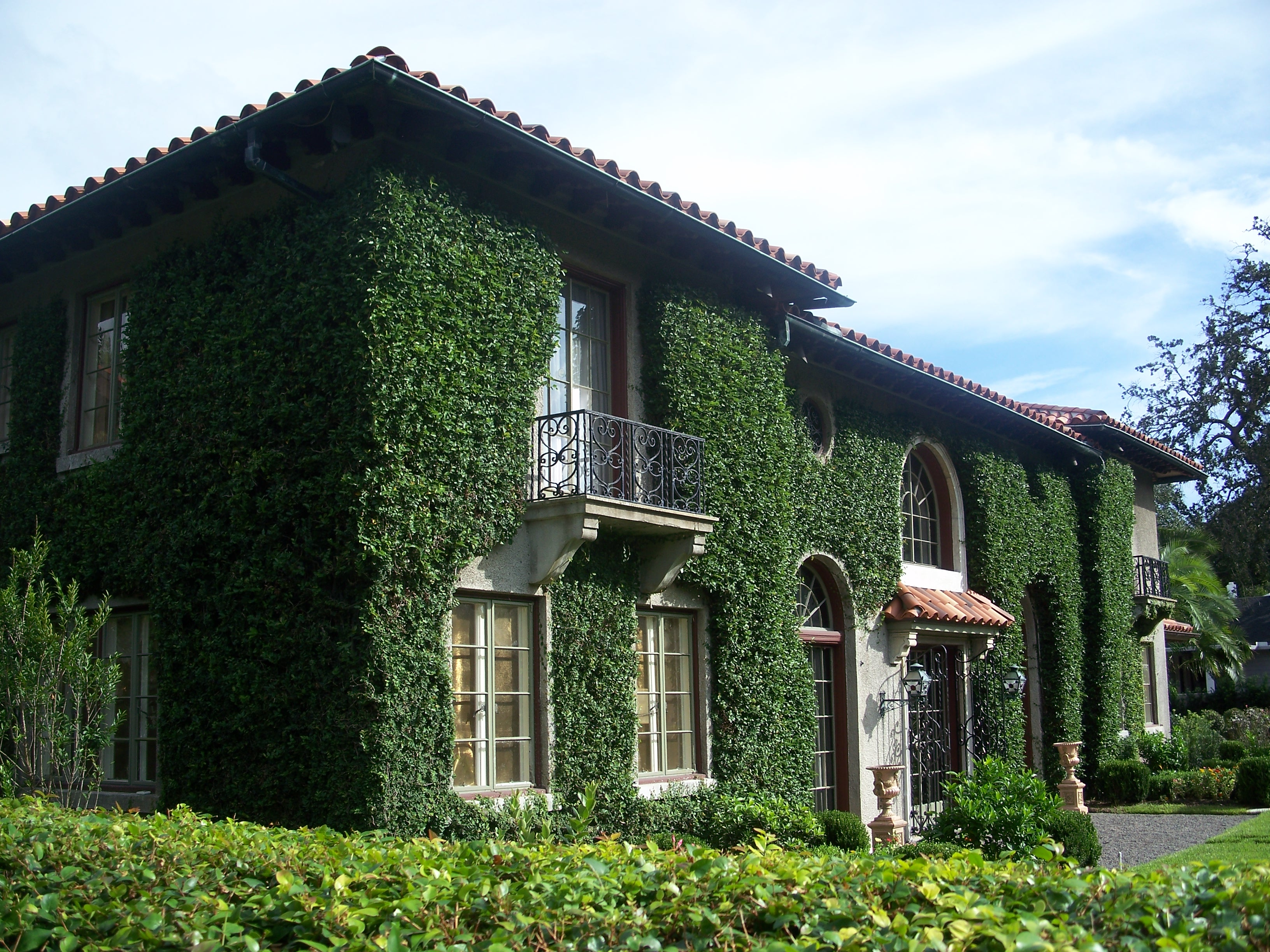
The A. Y. Milam house in the Davis Islands, designed by Adams and completed in 1926.

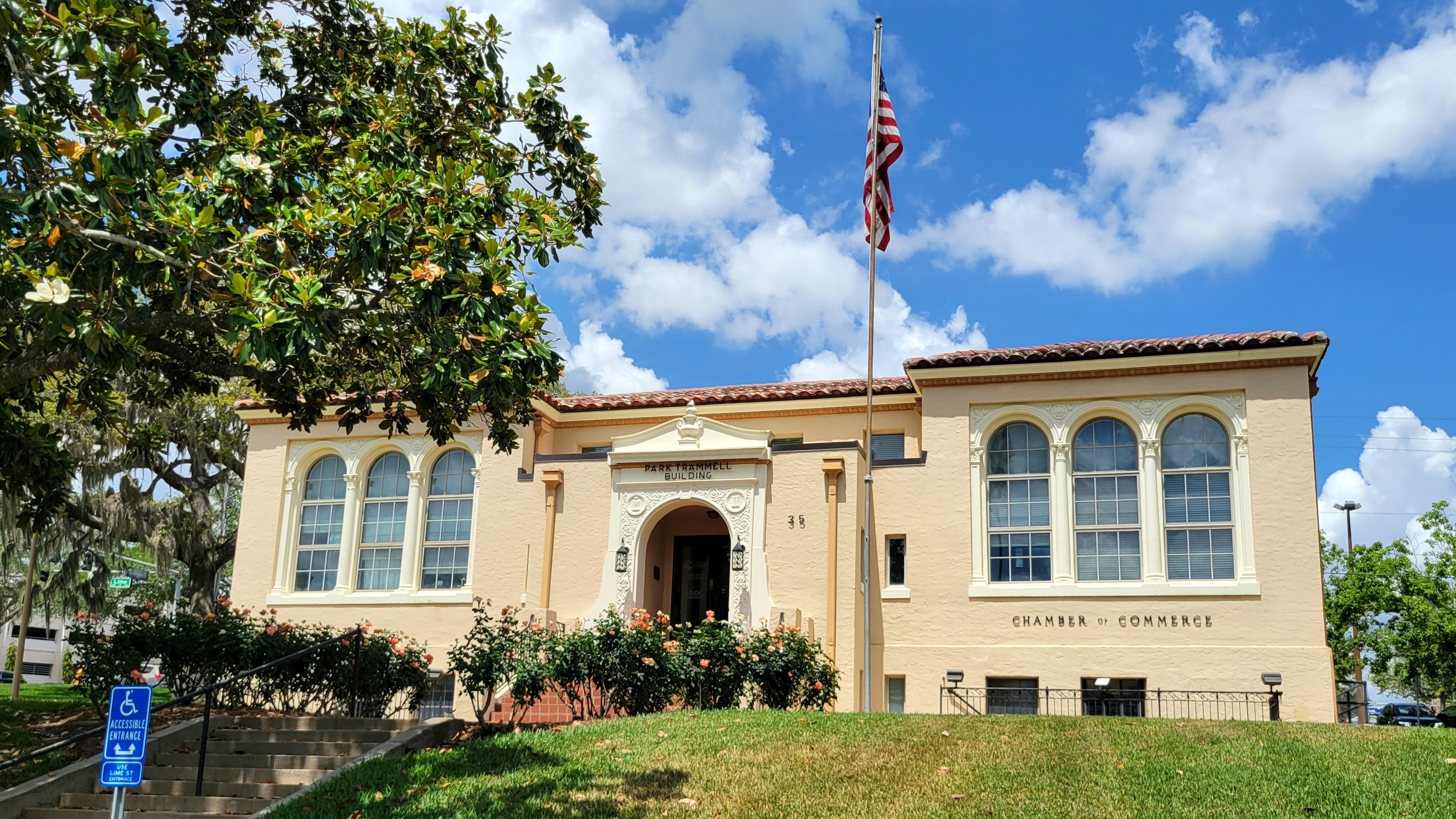
The former Lakeland Public Library, now the Park Trammell Building, designed by Adams and completed in 1927.

Franklin O. Adams Jr. (July 5, 1881 – November 27, 1967) was an American architect in Tampa, Florida.

== Life and career ==
Franklin Oliver Adams Jr. was born July 5, 1881, on a plantation near Waterproof, Tensas Parish, Louisiana, to Franklin Oliver Adams, a planter and Confederate veteran, and Susan Adams, née Drake. The Adams plantation, known as Locust Grove, had been established by Adams' great-grandfather and had been worked by slave labor before the Civil War. Due to the remoteness of the property he was educated at home by a governess. He graduated from Centenary College with a BS in 1901 and first worked as a teacher, teaching for a year in a log school in rural Mississippi. In 1902 he was hired to establish a high school at St. Joseph, the seat of Tensas Parish. He took a course in school administration at the University of Chicago before returning to St. Joseph, where he organized the school and was its head for two years. By 1904 he had decided on a career change and enrolled in the architectural school of the Massachusetts Institute of Technology, earning a BS in architecture in 1907. He worked briefly for Boston architects Newhall & Blevins before returning south. In 1909, following brief periods with several New Orleans architects, he joined the office of Harry Burt Wheelock in Birmingham, Alabama. After about five years with Wheelock he moved to Tampa and opened his own office in March 1914. In 1915 and 1916 he worked in partnership with F. M. Curtis under the name Curtis & Adams.

During World War I Adams worked as a draftsman in Augusta, Georgia, and Greensboro, North Carolina, and as a loftsman in Wilmington. In 1919 he became an assistant to North Carolina State Architect James A. Salter but returned to independent practice in Tampa in 1920. From then on Adams was sole proprietor of his architectural firm, though he was associated with architect Jefferson M. Hamilton from 1925 to 1933. During the 1920s Adams completed several important public buildings in the Tampa area: Lakeland City Hall (1926), Public Library (1927) and Harry S. Mayhall Auditorium (1927) in Lakeland and the Henry B. Plant High School (1927) in Tampa. During the same period he was architect for many of the buildings built by D. P. Davis as part of his Davis Islands development. All of these works were designed in the Mediterranean Revival style which prevailed in Florida at that time, but other projects were designed in revival styles more associated with the north. These include the Neoclassical former McKay Auditorium (1926, with Francis J. Kennard), now the Sykes College of Business of the University of Tampa, and the Colonial Revival Palma Ceia Presbyterian Church (1949).

Adams was married in 1914 to Caroline Kirkbride. They had two children, one son and one daughter. Adams assisted in the organization of the Tampa Builders Exchange and the Tampa Civic Art Commission and served as a member of the Municipal Housing Commission. He was a prominent southern member of the American Institute of Architects (AIA) and was elected a Fellow in 1940, the first to be elected from Tampa.

Adams died November 27, 1967, at the age of 86.

== Works ==
His works include:

- Lakeland City Hall (1926)
- Riverview Terrace
- Plant High School (1927). Tampa, Florida.
- Lakeland Public Library (1927). Lakeland, Florida.
- Harry S. Mayhall Auditorium, demolished (1927–1969). Lakeland, Florida.
- the second Morrell Memorial Hospital
- Plant City's South Florida Baptist Hospital (1953).

Works that have been added to the National Register of Historic Places:

- House at 116 West Davis Boulevard (1925). Tampa, Florida; Added in 1989.
- House at 301 Caspian Street (1925). Tampa, Florida; Added in 1989.
- Bay Isle Commercial Building (1926). Tampa, Florida; Added in 1989.
- House at 131 West Davis Boulevard (1928). Tampa, Florida; Added in 1990
