= Lakeland Public Library =

Public library in Lakeland, Florida

- 28.0374°N 81.9493°W
- Location: Lakeland, Florida, United States
- Type: Public library
- Established: 1927
- Branch of: Polk County Library Cooperative

Other information
- Website: www.lakeland.gov.net/departments/library

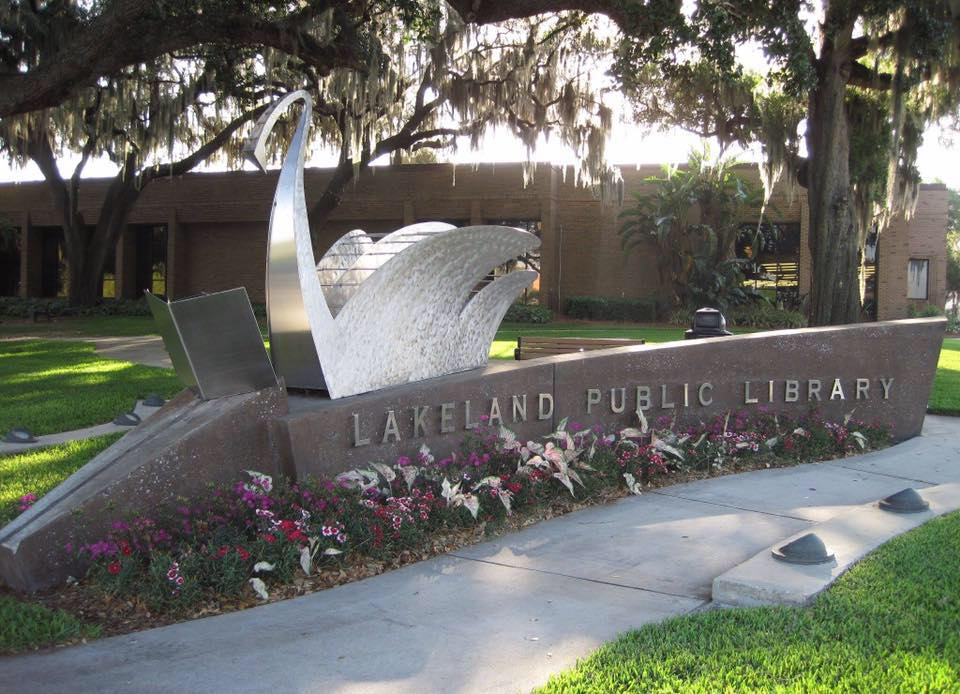
The Lakeland Public Library's swan sculpture and sign located off of Lake Morton Drive in Lakeland, Florida.

The Lakeland Public Library is a public library located in Lakeland, Florida, within Polk County, Florida. The library has three branch locations and is a member of the Polk County Library Cooperative (PCLC).

== History ==
The history of the Lakeland Public Library can be traced to 1912 when The Women's Club of Lakeland organized and maintained the only library accessible to the local community. In 1923 the Women's Club successfully lobbied Lakeland to purchase land from Herbert Munn on Lake Morton between Massachusetts Avenue and Iowa Avenue. The site had previously been a campground for Spanish–American War soldiers and was later a park. Lakeland purchased the land with a bond issue of $25,000.

By a vote of 461–122, Lakeland citizens, in 1924, approved a bond issue of $75,000 to build and equip the library. The building, the work of architect Franklin Adams Jr., was in the Mediterranean Revival style, had a steel circular staircase, and the lobby was decorated with a twelve-inch frieze. On January 6, 1927, the library opened. It was Lakeland's first public library and it was in what is now the Park Trammell Building on the north shore of Lake Morton. There were 5,000 volumes. The library also served as a depository for government documents.

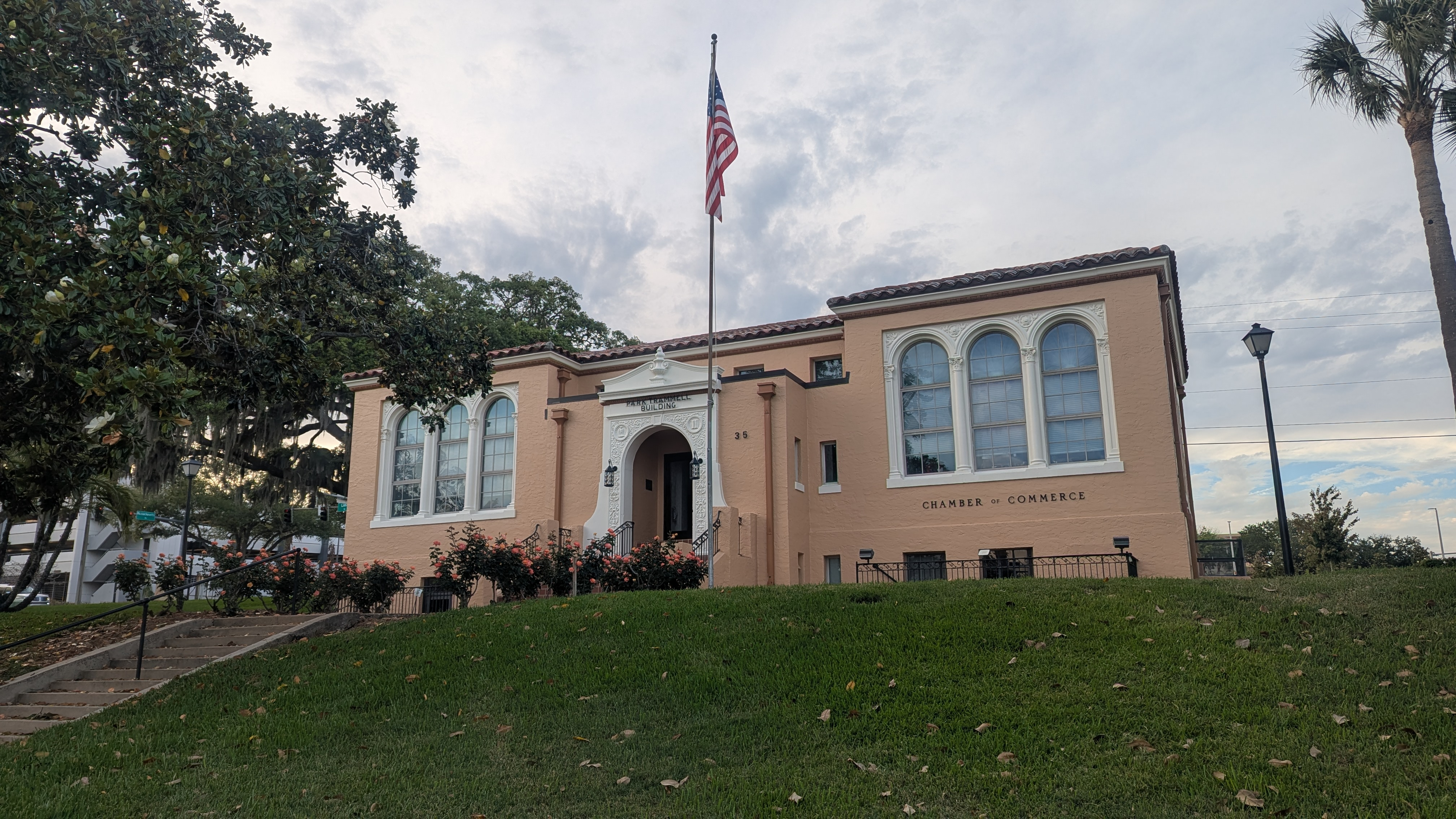
Once the first library in Lakeland, the Park Trammell building currently serves as the Lakeland Chamber of Commerce.

By 1938 the Library had a story hour for children, a nature club, and a fifteen-minute broadcast once a week on WLAK radio. In 1940 Mrs. Park Trammell gifted the library papers belonging to her deceased husband, former Lakeland mayor and Florida governor Park Trammell.

In 1954 a bookmobile began serving the city making 16 stops. A children's department opened in the basement in 1961. That summer a Smokey the Bear Summer Vacation Reading Program began. On May 15, 1962 the first Friends of the Library meeting was held. On April 5, 1965 plans for a new library building were approved, through a contract bid of $317, 716, to meet the increasing needs of citizens.

In 1966 the new facility was built on the east shore of Lake Morton and the library moved into its current location. By 1970 more than 73,000 books were available to citizens. In 1983 construction began to expand the library building and it was completed in July 1986. That same year the library was awarded a LSCA Title II grant if $7, 268 to join the SOLINET/OCLC interlibrary loan system. A year later in 1987 The Lakeland Room for special collections was opened.

In 1988 the library joined municipalities in Polk County to form a Reciprocal Borrowing program allowing patrons to borrow materials from any participating library. The photography collection of local photographer Dan Sanborn, was given to the library in 1990. His collection contained many photographs of local places and events.

In November 1990 Polk County voters selected to establish county-wide library system. In September 1992 the card catalog was replaced by a BiblioFile Intelligent Catalog which was a C.D. ROM system.

In September 1996 Lakeland City Commissioners voted to join the new Polk County Library Cooperative. On October 23, 2018 the Lakeland Public Library's first coffee shop opened to its patrons. The coffee shop, Black & Brew Lake Morton, is a smaller version of the downtown flagship cafe, Black & Brew Coffee House and Bistro, owned by Chris McArthur.

The first branch library was located at 1040 North Virginia Avenue. The library needed to expand its services and because of segregation they opened a second branch in 1939. Mrs. Elsie Dunbar was a teacher at Washington Park High School, the junior/senior high school that was segregated. She sponsored many clubs, giving her students opportunities they would not have had otherwise. She eventually became the vice principal and principal of Washington Park High School. In 1949, she earned the first awarded master’s degree from Florida A&M College. She saw a need for access to the library materials which were only available to white patrons because of segregation. She reached out to the librarian of the main branch, Serena Bailey, and they worked together to find a solution. It started with a collection in Mrs. Dunbar’s math classroom. They issued library cards for Inter Library Loans and worked from this satellite room for several years. In 1937, Mrs. Dunbar was able to persuade the city commission to use funds from the Works Progress Administration to renovate a small wooden bungalow at 1040 North Virginia Avenue to create a separate library space for black citizens. Mrs. Dunbar was the single librarian until her retirement. The branch library was open on select weekday afternoons and Saturday. It was the second designated black library in the state and held one of the best collections. The building closed when the Coleman-Bush building was built in 1975. The building had a reading room with some of the old collection there. Eventually, the demand outgrew the building and the Lakeland Branch Library was opened in 1995. This library was eventually renamed the Larry R. Jackson Library after a local attorney who fought for this branch library.

In 2019, an initiative led by City Commissioner Phillip Walker, was first presented to the City Commission to create a history center in Lakeland to showcase the city's unique history and culture. With the project unanimously approved, funds were allocated by the Commission and the Lakeland Public Library was chosen as the location for the future exhibit space. An advisory committee made up of educators, city officials, local business owners, and civic and community leaders, led by former Mayor Gow Fields, was established to organize and advise the City in the design, content, and construction of the exhibit. The history center, known as the Lakeland History & Culture Center, finally opened on September 8, 2022, with a 1,400 square foot exhibit gallery and adjoining history and research room.

== Main Library and Branches ==
=== Lakeland Public Library ===
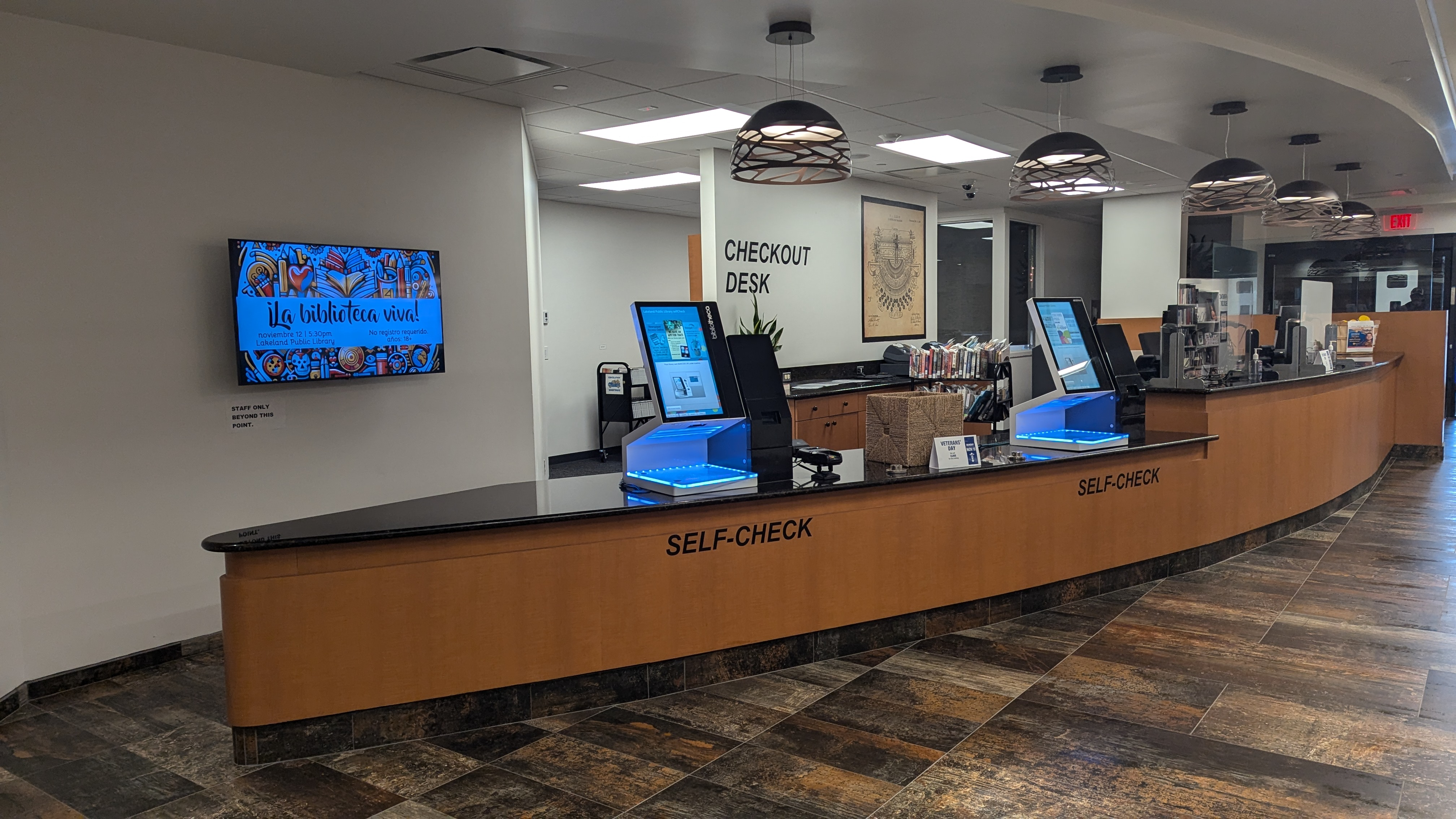
Checkout desk at the Main Lakeland location, it includes two staffed stations and two self-checkout machines.

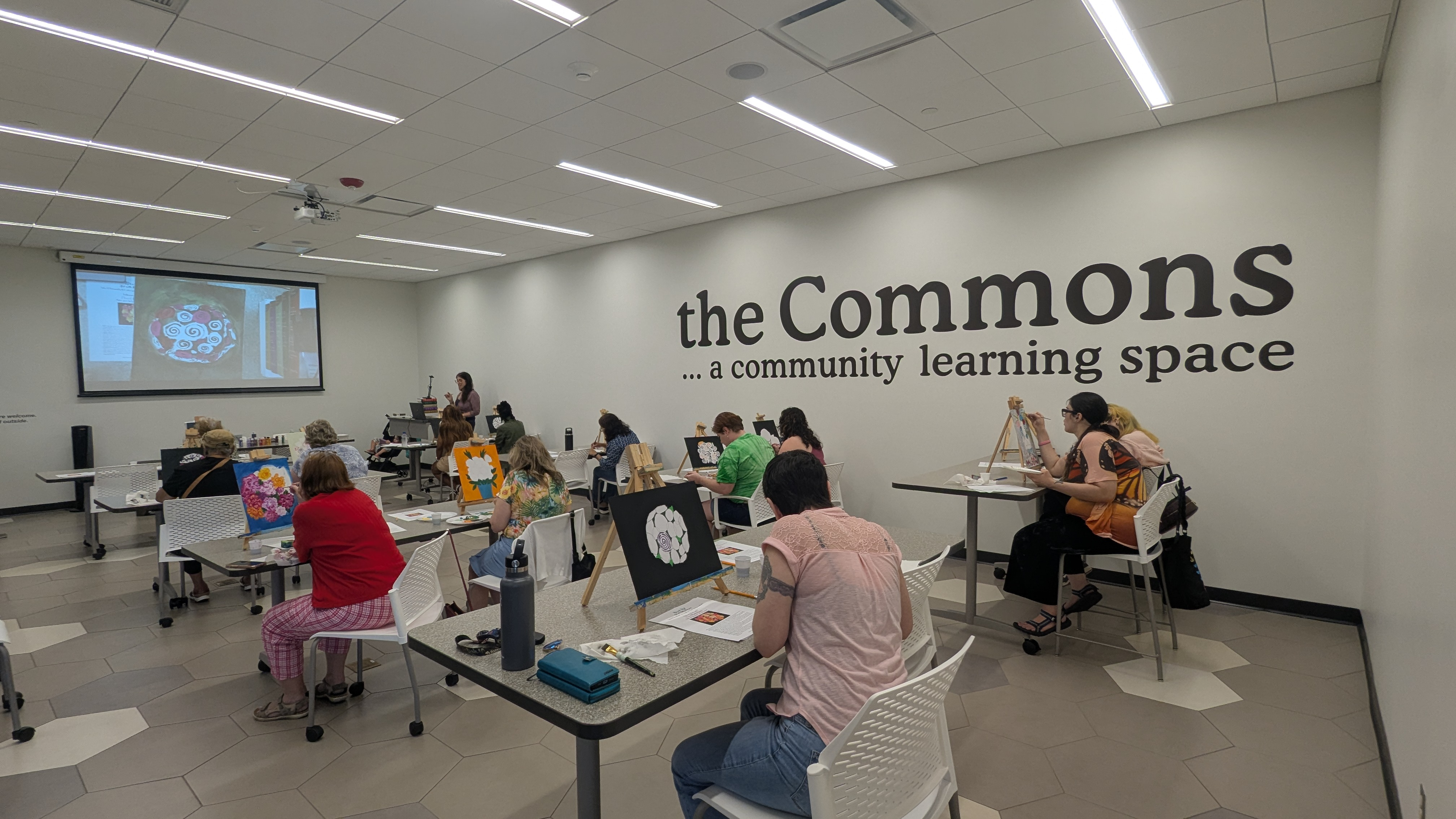
The Commons is a multi-use room at the Main location, which opened after the renovations that were completed January 2025.

The oldest Lakeland library location has been in its current address since April 20, 1966. This location also houses the Lakeland History Room, which features a number of original artifacts from Lakeland's history, and includes research assistance with local history, house and properties records research, family genealogy, and digitization services. In 2021, construction began on the Lakeland History & Culture Center, "a dedicated exhibit and research space that shares inclusive stories of Lakeland in harmony with all those who have contributed, and continue to contribute, to its culturally diverse history," and opened the following year. The center features an exhibit gallery related to city history and an adjoining history and research room with guided access to city archives and a digitization lab.

=== Larry R. Jackson Branch Library ===
Larry R. Jackson Branch Library
- Interactive map of the Larry R. Jackson Branch Library area

General information
- Location: Lakeland, Florida, 1700 N. Florida Avenue, Lakeland, FL 33805
- Opened: 1995

Website
- https://www.lakelandgov.net/departments/library/locations-hours/larry-r-jackson-branch-library/

The Larry R. Jackson Branch Library was originally opened in 1995 as the Lakeland Branch Library, replacing a small reading room in the city-owned Coleman-Bush building. It was renamed in 1998 after Larry R. Jackson, a Black attorney and president of the Lakeland branch of the NAACP who worked with city officials to establish a library in North Lakeland.

=== eLibrary South Lakeland ===
The "e" stands for express. The library branch opened in 2007 to serve patrons in South Lakeland as a joint project between the Lakeland Public Library and the Polk County Library Cooperative. On September 2, 2023, the eLibrary was permanently closed after sixteen years of operation. The small collection featured recent fiction, non-fiction, DVDs, CDs, audiobooks, bestsellers, and HotSpots. Additionally, they offered ten public access computers, free Wi-Fi, and pick-up or drop-off of items from any Polk County public library.

=== Kelly Branch Library ===
The Kelly Branch Library opened on September 18, 2023 at the Kelly Recreation Complex replacing the South Lakeland eLibrary which had operated sixteen years in the Lake Miriam Square shopping plaza.

== Programs and Classes ==
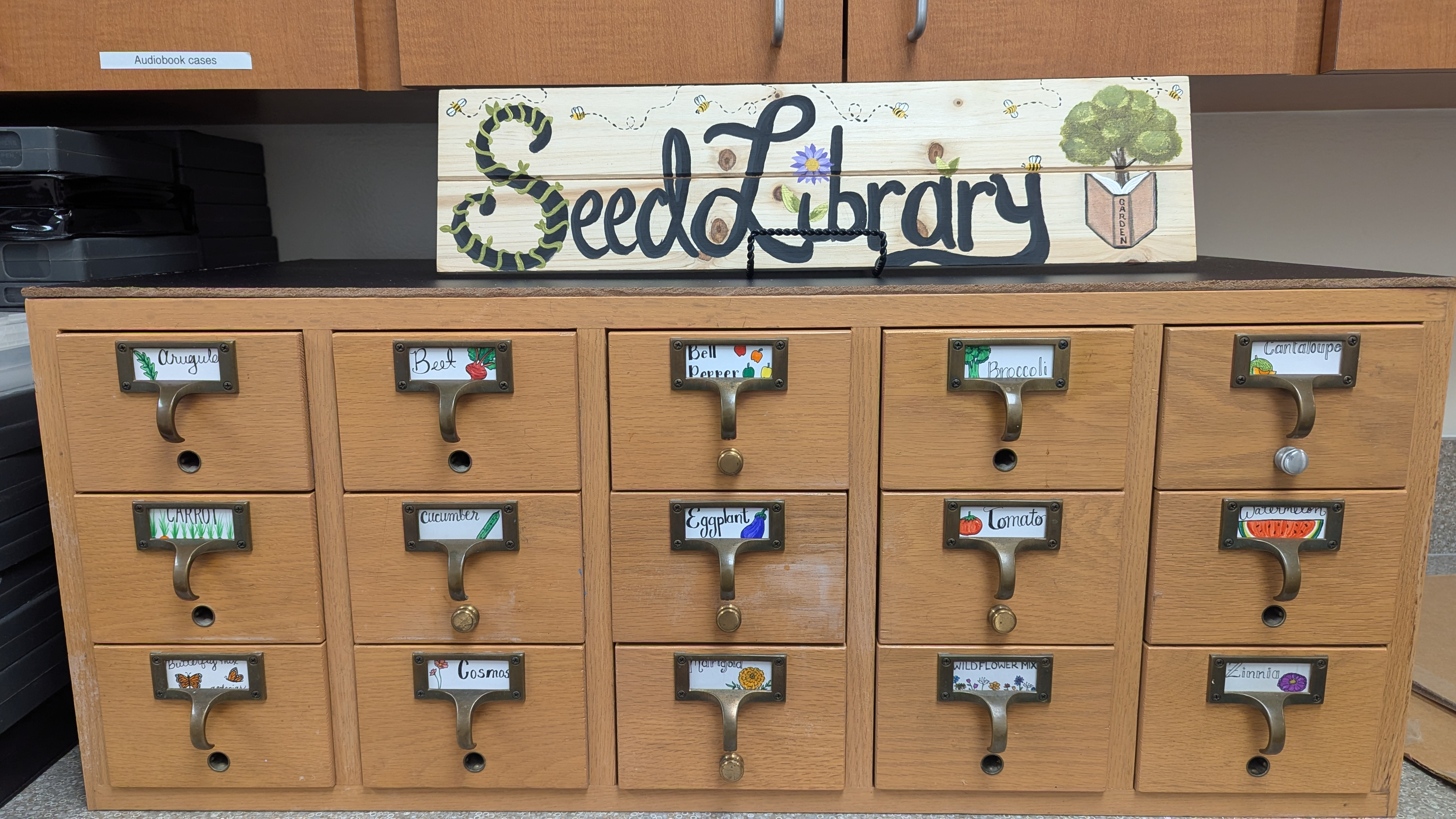
The Main Lakeland location provides a seasonal Seed Library located behind the Service desk.

All three of the Lakeland libraries provide virtual and in-person programs, classes, and events to the community, usually free of cost. On the Library's website you can find all of the upcoming events on the Events Calendar.

Programs like the cemetery tours, house history workshops, and Ancestry.com classes are provided by the staff of the Lakeland History Room.

Between the three locations there are four book clubs: The Reserve, Books Sandwiched In, ¡La biblioteca viva!, and Sweet & Spicy.

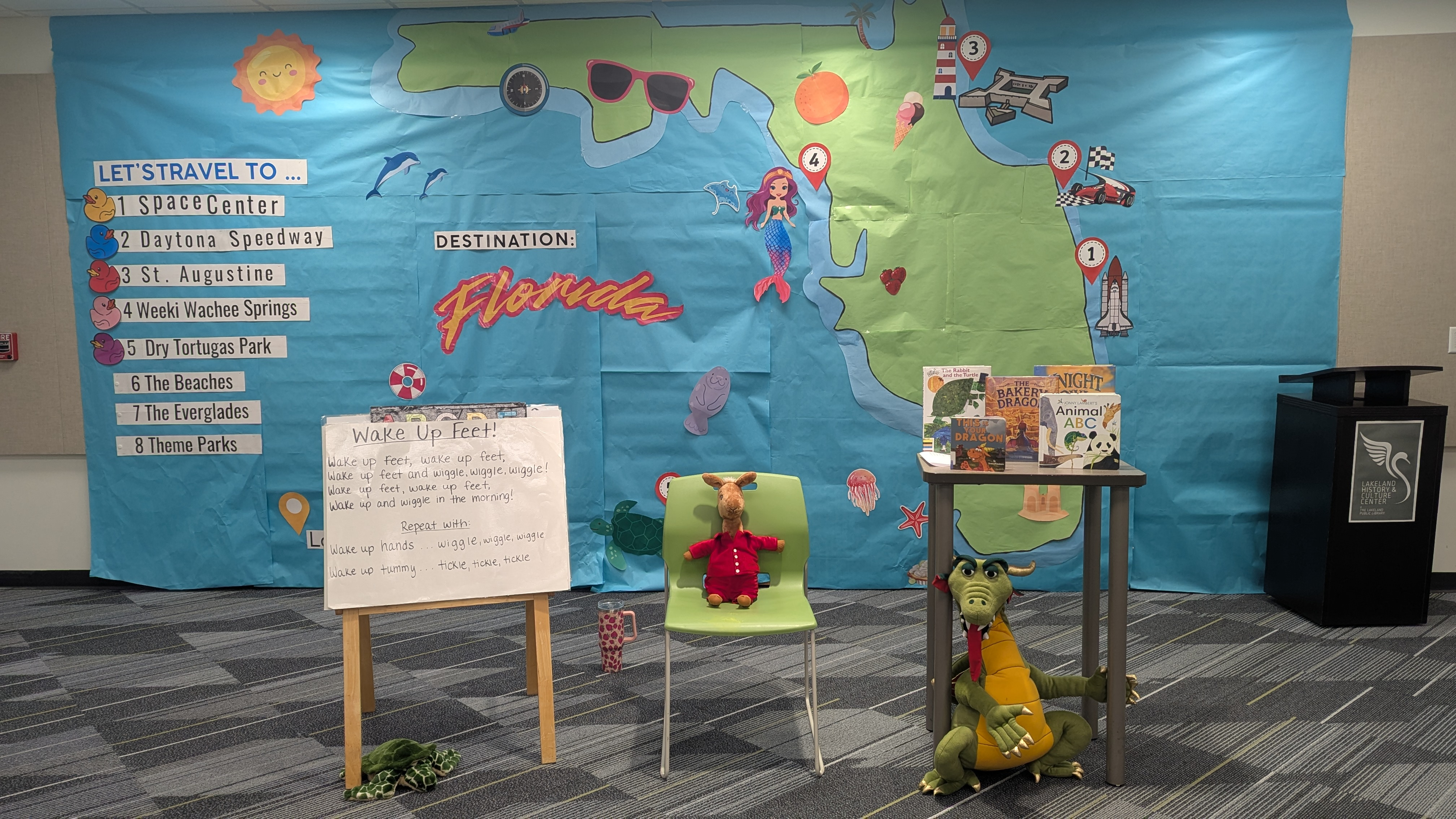
Baby story time setup from the 2025 Summer Reading Program.

The Youth Services teams provide a number of programs for patrons 0-18 years old. Between the three locations there are Teen, STEAM, and LEGO clubs. Story times are provided for ages 2-5, baby story time for ages 0-2, and bilingual story time for Spanish speaking patrons. During story time staff engage with children through reading aloud, singing, dancing, and play.
