= House at 131 West Davis Boulevard =

Historic house in Florida, United States

- U.S. National Register of Historic Places
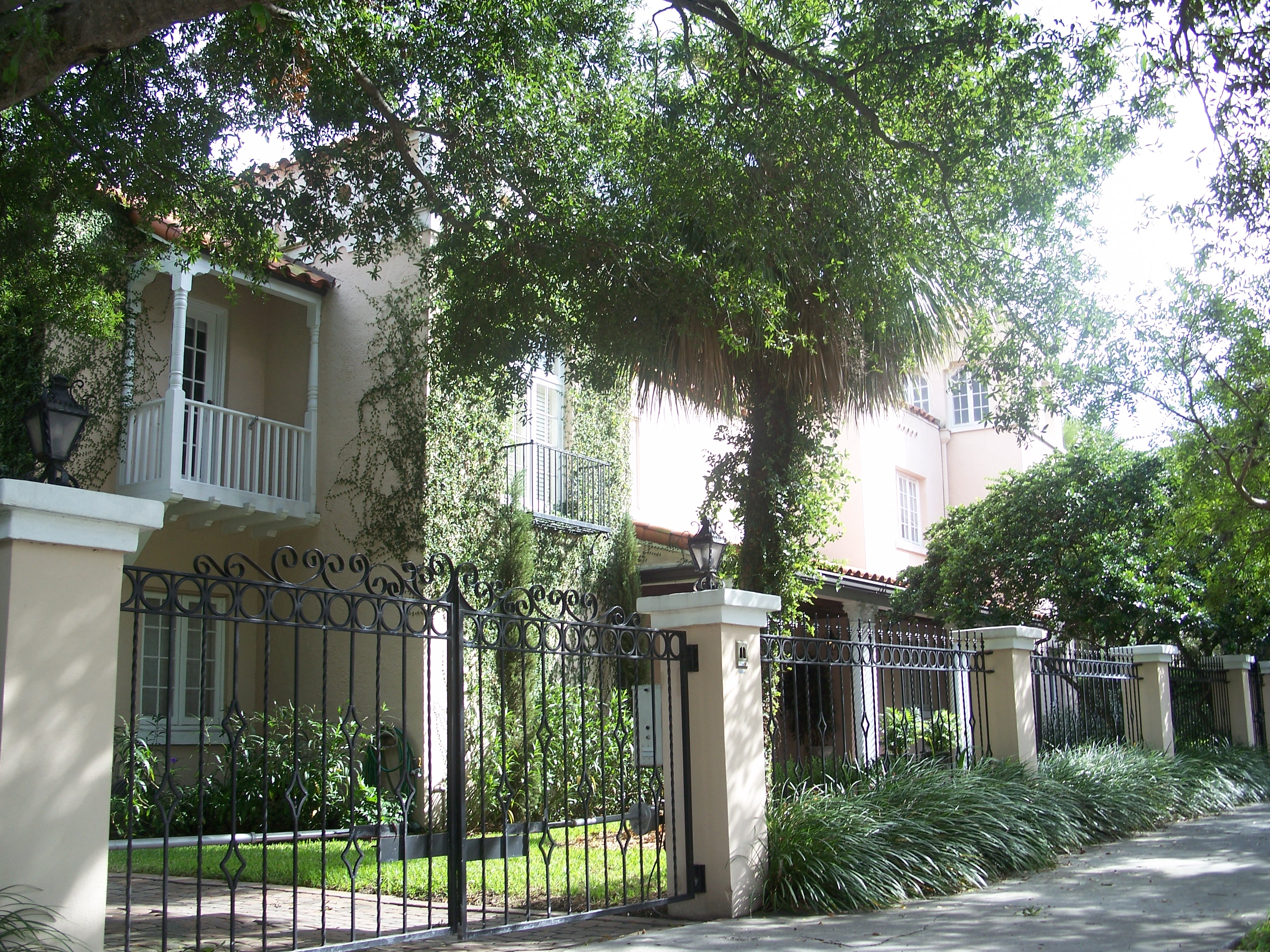

- Location within Florida Location within the United States
- Location: Tampa, Florida
- Coordinates: 27°55′38″N 82°27′28″W
- Architect: Franklin O. Adams
- Architectural style: Late 19th And 20th Century Revivals
- MPS: Mediterranean Revival Style Buildings of Davis Islands MPS
- NRHP reference No.: 89002161
- Added to NRHP: January 8, 1990

The House at 131 West Davis Boulevard is a historic home in Tampa, Florida. It is located at 131 West Davis Boulevard. On January 8, 1990, it was added to the U.S. National Register of Historic Places. Franklin O. Adams was the building's architect.
