= Morton (restaurant) =

Finnish restaurant chain

Coordinates: 60°9′46.45″N 24°55′20.99″E

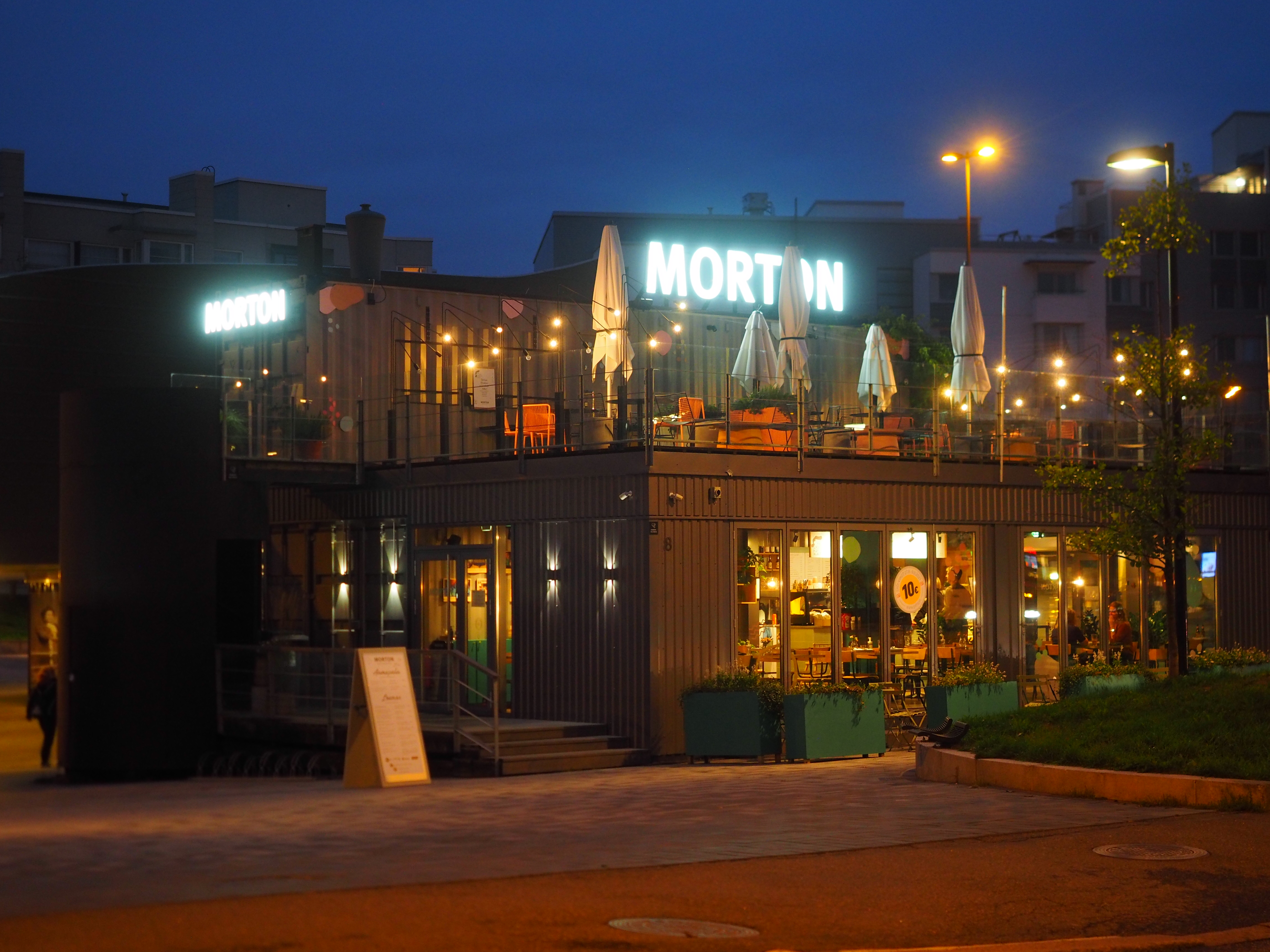
Restaurant Morton in Helsinki.

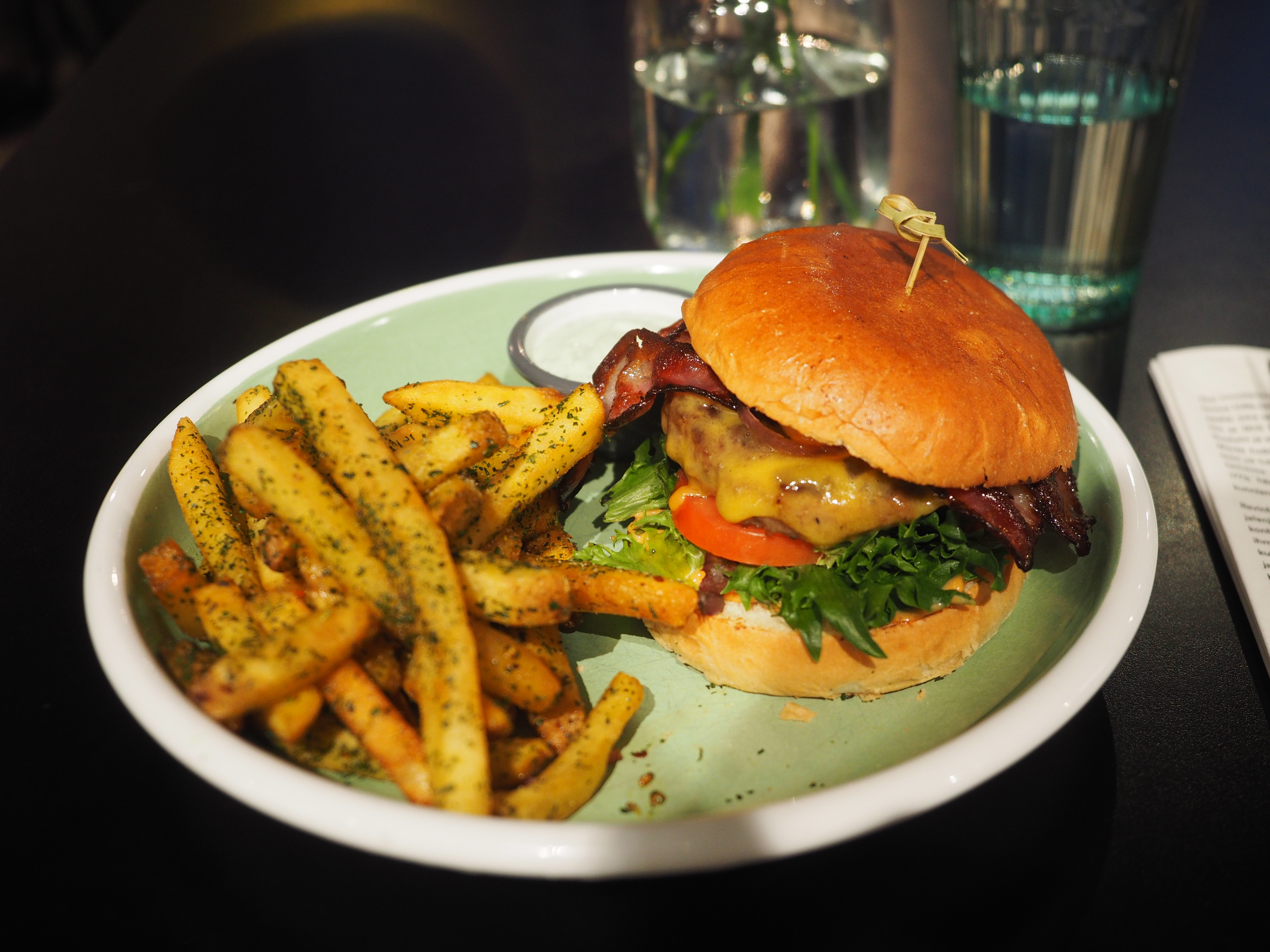
Delaware Burger is one of restaurant Morton's signature dishes.

Morton is a Finnish restaurant chain consisting of hamburger restaurants built into cargo containers active in summertime and the all-year-round restaurant Morton in Helsinki.

== History ==
The 22-year-olds Jarna Kaplas, Petri Virta and Iiro Lyytinen founded restaurant Morton with 300 places and a music venue in Rautalampi in summer 2010. The founders were young entrepreneurship students from the Tiimiakatemia academy in Jyväskylä. They had only two and a half months of experience from the restaurant industry put together. Virta and Lyytinen were from Rautalampi with 3000 inhabitants and Kaplas was from neighbouring Suonenjoki. The restaurant was founded in an old hardware store with a business area of 300 square metres. The premises were renovated in a volunteer effort attended by 70 local people. The restaurant was named after an 18th-century American politician. The roots of John Morton's great-grandfather are said to have come from Rautalampi. This business idea caused much confusion, but the restaurant became popular. During the next five years, the venue was attended by about 150 artists, including JVG, PMMP, Jukka Poika, Sound Explosion Band, Jätkäjätkät, Samuli Putro and Petri Nygård. When the founders received offers to found restaurants in other cities too, they had an idea to build restaurants in old cargo containers.

The first container restaurant was founded in summer 2013 for one week at the Kansalaistori square in Helsinki as part of a marketing campaign by the city of Rautalampi. The container was later moved to the market square in Pieksämäki.

The Morton restaurant in Rautalampi was closed in 2014.

In 2015 the Morton restaurant in Rautalampi was sold to a new owner. Kaplas bought all of the other activities of the chain for himself and started managing container restaurants active in summertime. The chain had three container restaurants, one each in Pieksämäki, Varkaus and Äänekoski, the latter having a restaurant with over a hundred spaces. The chain had a total revenue of over half a million euro.

In 2017 the chain had a total revenue of about 800 thousand euro.

In May 2018 the first Morton restaurant was opened in Jyväskylä, along the Rantaraitti trail. The other restaurants in the chain were located in Kuopio, Varkaus and Äänekoski. The Jyväskylä restaurant had 50 spaces, of which half were indoors. The lot was rented for a period of five years. The restaurant, built from two cargo containers, was 20 metres long and the chain's first restaurant where customers could eat indoors.

In 2019 the chain had container restaurants in Jyväskylä, Kuopio, Pieksämäki, Varkaus and Äänekoski. The chain had a total revenue of about two million euro.

In early 2020 Virta returned as creative director of the company. In middle March the company signed a preliminary contract of a container restaurant in Helsinki. In summer 2020 the Morton chain had hamburger restaurants built in containers in Joensuu, Jyväskylä, Kuopio, Pieksämäki and Varkaus. Because of the COVID-19 pandemic they started selling take away food for the first time. The deal of the new restaurant was confirmed in June. The container restaurants had a total of 60 employees and their combined revenue was over 2.7 million euro. The first all-year-round restaurant was opened in Helsinki, when the company had bought the activities of the container restaurant Cargo located in Ruoholahti. The restaurant had 150 customer places, of which 50 were indoors and 100 were on a summer terrace. The company started renovating the premises in late September and the restaurant was opened in November.

In May 2021 Morton returned to Rautalampi by opening the chain's first café there. The café, concentrating on breakfast and pancakes, was built into a container. The chain also had restaurants in six other cities: an all-year-round restaurant in Helsinki and summer restaurants in Jyväskylä, Joensuu, Kuopio, Pieksämäki and Varkaus.

== Organisation ==
The parent corporation of the company is Emäpitäjän Anniskeluravintolat Oy, whose daughter company Morton Moment Oy manages the restaurant in Helsinki. In 2020 the chain included five container restaurants active in summer and an all-year-round container restaurant in Helsinki.

== Awards ==
- In 2019 Kaplas was awarded best young entrepreneur of the year and was invited to the presidential Independence Day Reception.
