= Covington-Sawyer-Wilderness, Washington =

Covington-Sawyer-Wilderness
- Former CDP
- Location within the state of Washington
- Coordinates: 47°21′10″N 122°4′23″W
- Country: United States
- State: Washington
- County: King
- Time zone: UTC-8 (Pacific (PST))
  - Summer (DST): UTC-7 (PDT)

Covington-Sawyer-Wilderness was a Census-designated place in King County, Washington. The CDP was disbanded in 2000 United States Census, with portions incorporated into Covington, Black Diamond, and Maple Valley. The remainder was reassigned to Lake Morton-Berrydale CDP. The population in 1990 was 24,321. The census area, located in the southern end of the county, was located at 47.352810 north, 122.073107 west.

== Demographics ==
Covington-Sawyer first appeared as a census designated place in the 1990 U.S. census. It was deleted prior to the 2000 U.S. census with its geography being divided amongst the cities of Black Diamond, Washington, and Maple Valley and the Lake Morton-Berrydale CDP.

Historical population
Census	Pop.	Note	%±
1990	24,321		—
U.S. Decennial Census; 1960 1970 1980 1990; 2000 2010
