= House at 116 West Davis Boulevard =

Historic house in Florida, United States

- U.S. National Register of Historic Places
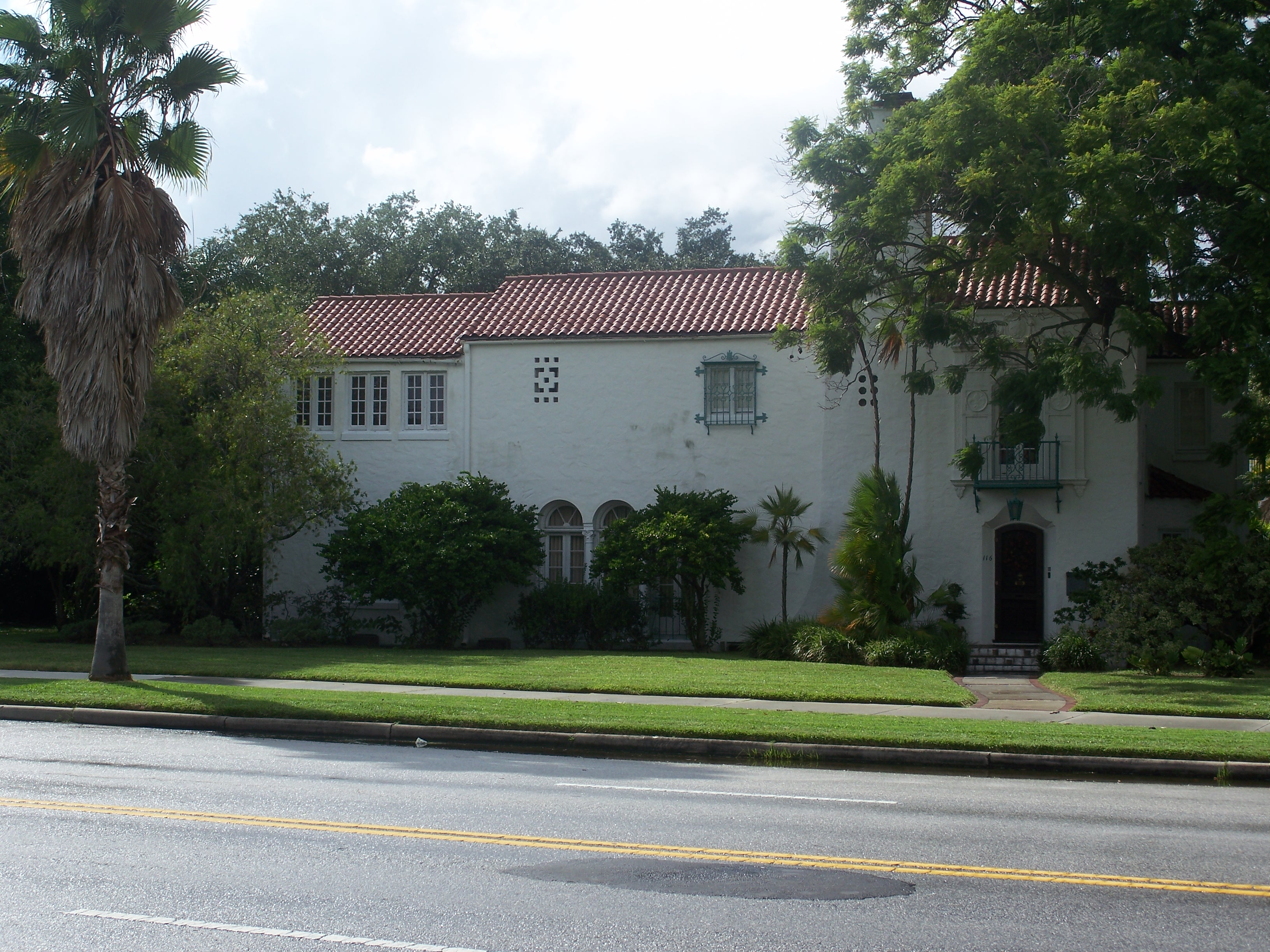

- Location within Florida Location within the United States
- Location: Tampa, Florida, United States
- Coordinates: 27°55′42″N 82°27′27″W
- Architect: Franklin O. Adams, Jr.
- Architectural style: Late 19th And 20th Century Revivals
- MPS: Mediterranean Revival Style Buildings of Davis Islands MPS
- NRHP reference No.: 89000973
- Added to NRHP: August 3, 1989

The House at 116 West Davis Boulevard is a historic home in Tampa, Florida, United States. It is located at 116 West Davis Boulevard. On August 3, 1989, it was added to the U.S. National Register of Historic Places. Designed by architect Franklin O. Adams, Jr. and built in 1925, it is an example of the Mediterranean Revival style. It was the home of D.P. Davis (1885-1926), the developer of Davis Islands in Tampa and Davis Shores in St. Augustine, and one of the most prominent figures in the Florida Land Boom of the 1920s.

== History ==
Construction of the home began in August 1925 and cost $40,000, according to the National Register of Historic Places. The Tampa Tribune reported the house was ready for occupancy in May 1926. In October 1926, Davis set sail for Europe on board the Majestic, which was the largest ship in the world and a sister ship to the Titanic. During the journey he went overboard and drowned. In 1929, the house was sold to August Van Eepoel Jr., a prominent dairyman whose father, August Van Eepoel, was mockingly called “that crazy Dutchman” for introducing milk pasteurization to the area in 1921. The Van Eepoel family remained in the house through 1947. The home was put up for sale in 2024. “It is rare to find a home in one of Tampa’s most historic neighborhoods that embodies so much history with a legacy that stands as a symbol of the original developer’s vision and ambition for Davis Islands,” said B.G. Holmberg, a real estate agent representing the property.

== Gallery ==
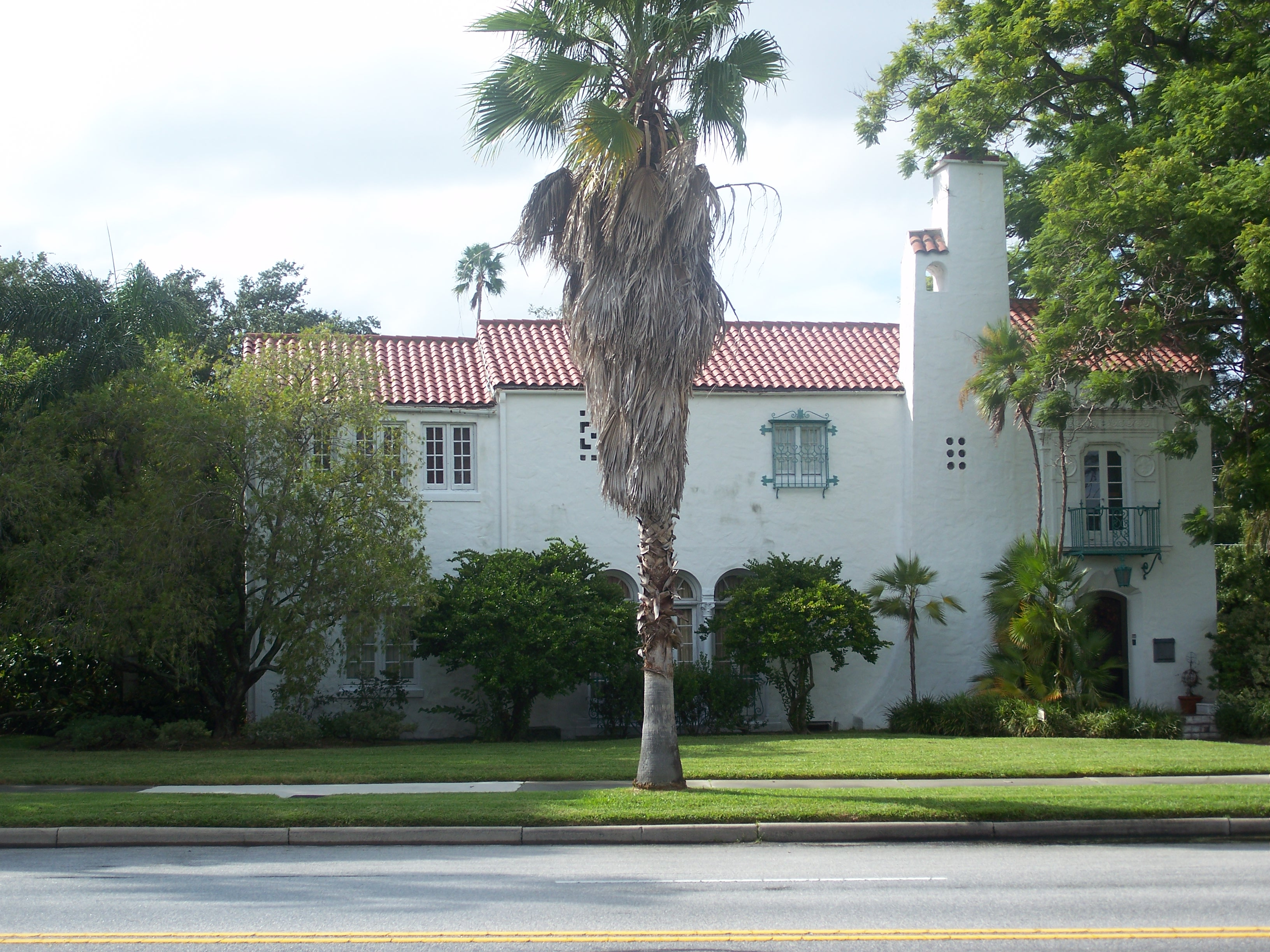

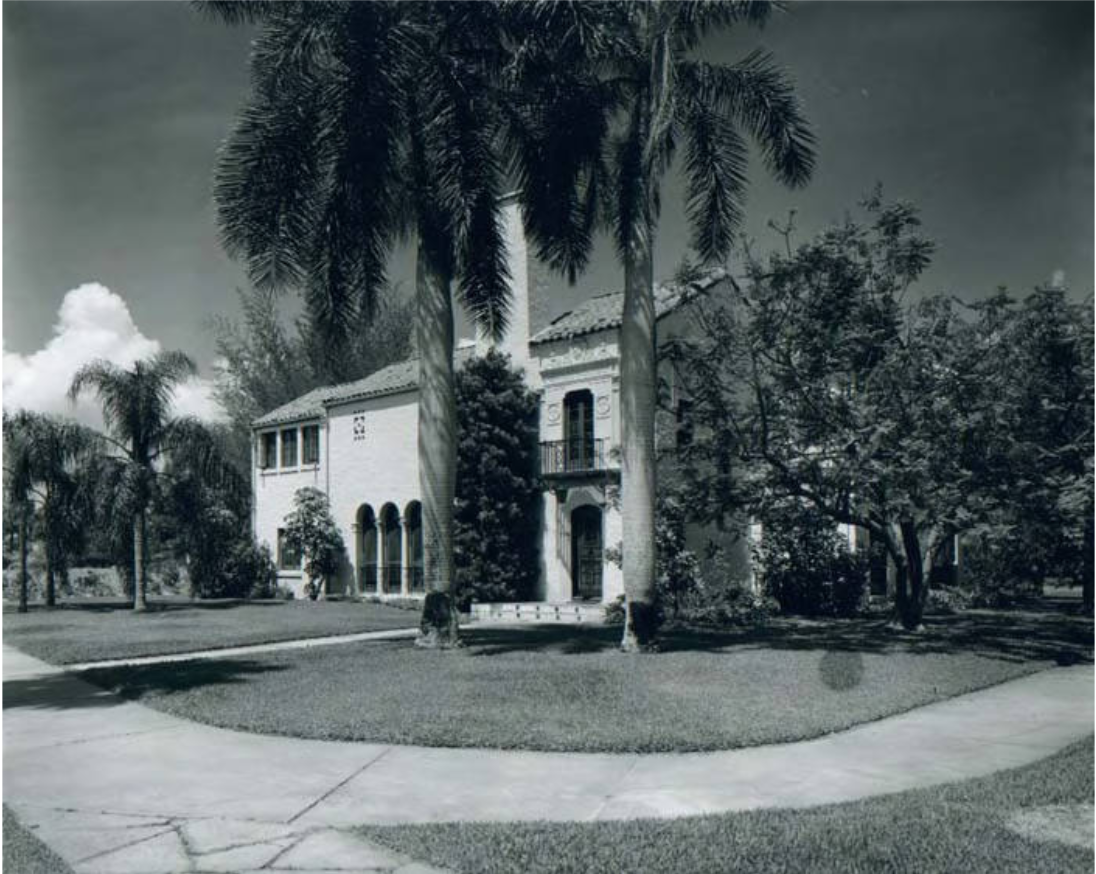
Residence of D. P. Davis at 116 West Davis Boulevard on Davis Islands : Tampa, Florida 1952

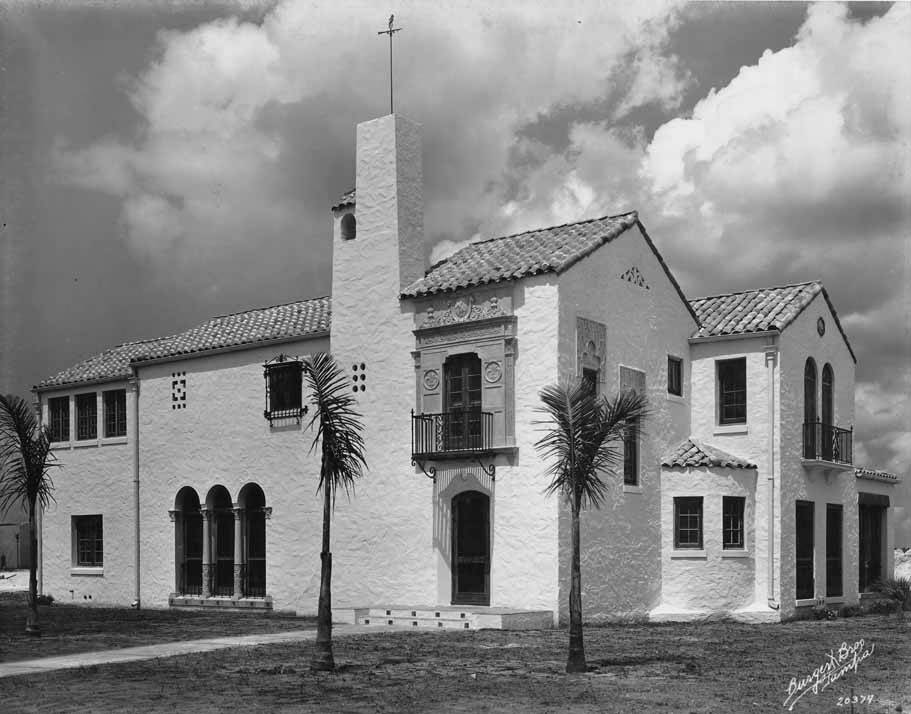
D. P. Davis home : Tampa, Fla. 1926
