= Lake Holm, Washington =

- Census-designated place
- Location in Washington and the United States Lake Holm (the United States)
- Coordinates: 47°17′53″N 122°07′19″W
- Country: United States
- State: Washington
- County: King

Area
  - Total: 8.56 sq mi (22.18 km^{2})
  - Land: 8.36 sq mi (21.65 km^{2})
  - Water: 0.20 sq mi (0.53 km^{2})
- Elevation: 407 ft (124 m)

Population (2010)
  - Total: 3,221
  - Density: 385/sq mi (148.7/km^{2})
- Time zone: UTC-8 (Pacific (PST))
  - Summer (DST): UTC-7 (PDT)
- ZIP code: 98092
- Area code: 253
- GNIS feature ID: 2584994
- FIPS code: 53-37345

Lake Holm is a census-designated place (CDP) in King County, Washington, United States. As of the 2020 census, Lake Holm had a population of 3,430.

== Geography ==
Lake Holm is located in southwestern King County and is bordered to the west by the city of Auburn and to the north by the Lake Morton-Berrydale CDP. The southern border of the Lake Holm CDP follows the Green River, and the northern border follows Big Soos Creek and Covington Creek, tributaries of the Green. Lake Holm is 19 miles (31 km) east of Tacoma and 27 miles (43 km) south-southeast of Seattle.

According to the United States Census Bureau, the CDP has a total area of 8.56 square miles (22.18 km^{2}), of which 8.36 square miles (21.65 km^{2}) are land and 0.20 square miles (0.53 km^{2}), or 2.37%, are water.

== Demographics ==
Historical population
Census	Pop.	Note	%±
2010	3,221		—
2020	3,430		6.5%
U.S. Decennial Census; 2000 2010

Lake Holm first appeared as a census designated place in the 2010 U.S. census.

=== Racial and ethnic composition ===
Lake Holm CDP, Washington – Racial and ethnic composition Note: the US Census treats Hispanic/Latino as an ethnic category. This table excludes Latinos from the racial categories and assigns them to a separate category. Hispanics/Latinos may be of any race.
Race / Ethnicity (NH = Non-Hispanic)	Pop 2010	Pop 2020	% 2010	% 2020
White alone (NH)	2,830	2,697	87.86%	78.63%
Black or African American alone (NH)	28	28	0.87%	0.82%
Native American or Alaska Native alone (NH)	24	28	0.75%	0.82%
Asian alone (NH)	103	187	3.20%	5.45%
Native Hawaiian or Pacific Islander alone (NH)	24	6	0.75%	0.17%
Other race alone (NH)	6	13	0.19%	0.38%
Mixed race or Multiracial (NH)	89	214	2.76%	6.24%
Hispanic or Latino (any race)	117	257	3.63%	7.49%
Total	3,221	3,430	100.00%	100.00%
