= Asa (rapper) =

Finnish rap artist and music producer

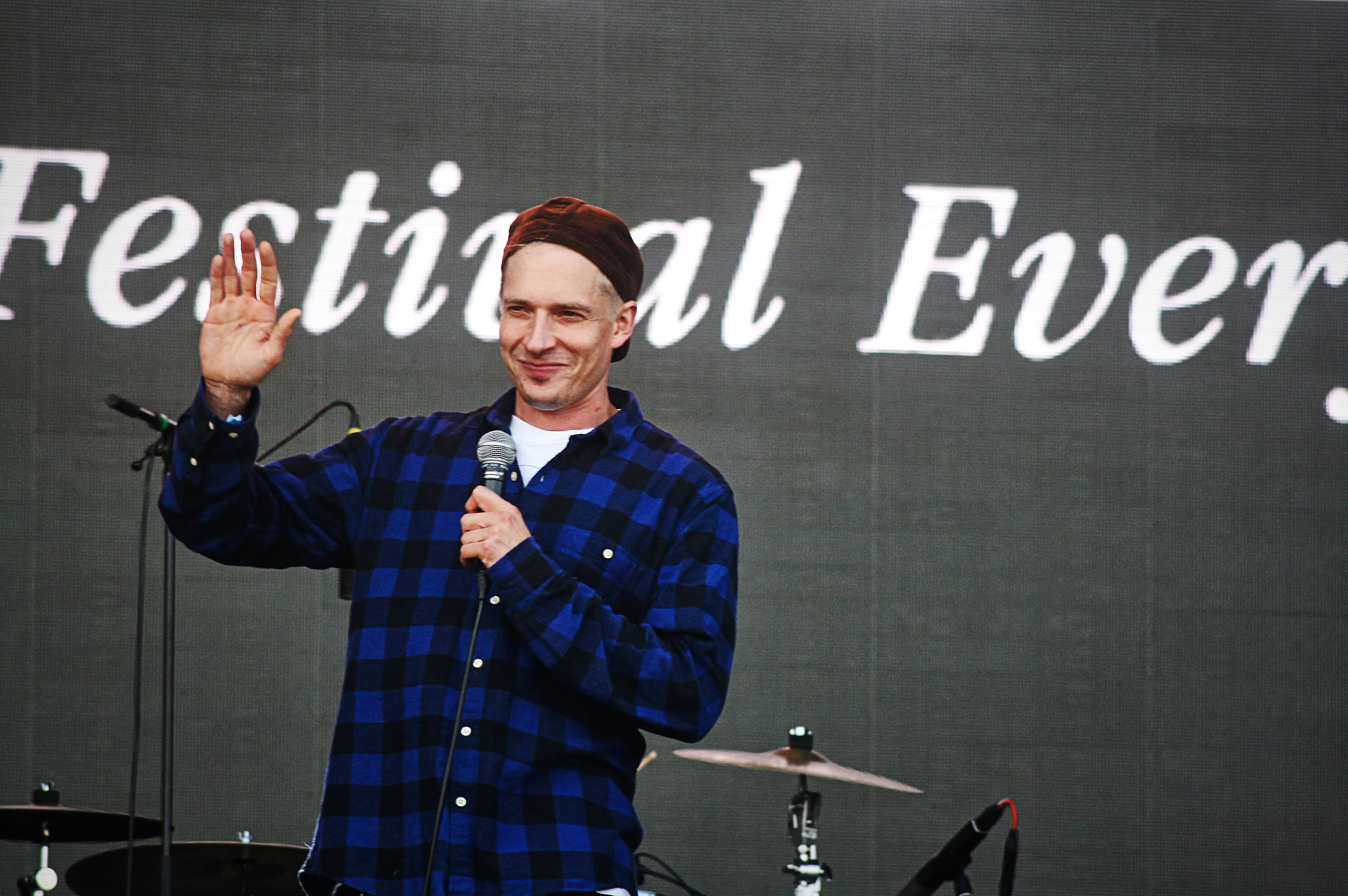
- Asa in 2015

Background information
- Also known as: Avain (1999–2003); Asa Masa
- Born: Matti Mikael Salo; 1980 (age 45–46)
- Origin: Helsinki, Finland
- Genres: Political hip hop; folk; reggae
- Occupations: Rapper; record producer; singer
- Instrument: Vocals
- Years active: 2001–present

Matti Mikael Salo (born 1980), professionally known as Asa and previously as Avain, is a Finnish rapper, record producer and singer. He is also a member of hip hop and reggae group Jätkäjätkät.

== Career beginnings ==
In the early 2000s, Salo was signed to Warner Music Finland. Under his initial stage name Avain, he released his debut album Punainen tiili (The Red Brick) in 2001. With its socially conscious lyrics, the album is considered to be one of the most important Finnish hip hop albums of all time. Soon after its release, Salo parted ways with his record company and went on a few years hiatus.

== Later career ==
While the rights to his former stage name remained at Warner Music, Salo emerged in 2004 with his current alias Asa. To date, he has released nine studio albums, two of which have reached number two on the Finnish Albums Chart, along with three albums with the group Jätkäjätkät.

== Personal life ==
In 2006, Asa was fined for possession of marijuana, cocaine and hash.

== Selected discography ==
=== Solo albums ===
Year	Title	Peak position
Year	Title	FIN
2001	Punainen tiili	5
2005	Leijonaa mä metsästän	3
2006	Terveisiä kaaoksesta	7
2008	Loppuasukas	4
2011	Jou jou	2
2012	Foetida – Use Your Illusion III	11
2013	Rapsodia	16
2015	Love	2

=== With Jätkäjätkät ===
Year	Title	Peak position
Year	Title	FIN
2010	Ykstoist ykstoist	6
2011	Jatkojatkot	8
2013	Marian sairaala	3
