= House at 301 Caspian Street =

Historic house in Florida, United States

- U.S. National Register of Historic Places
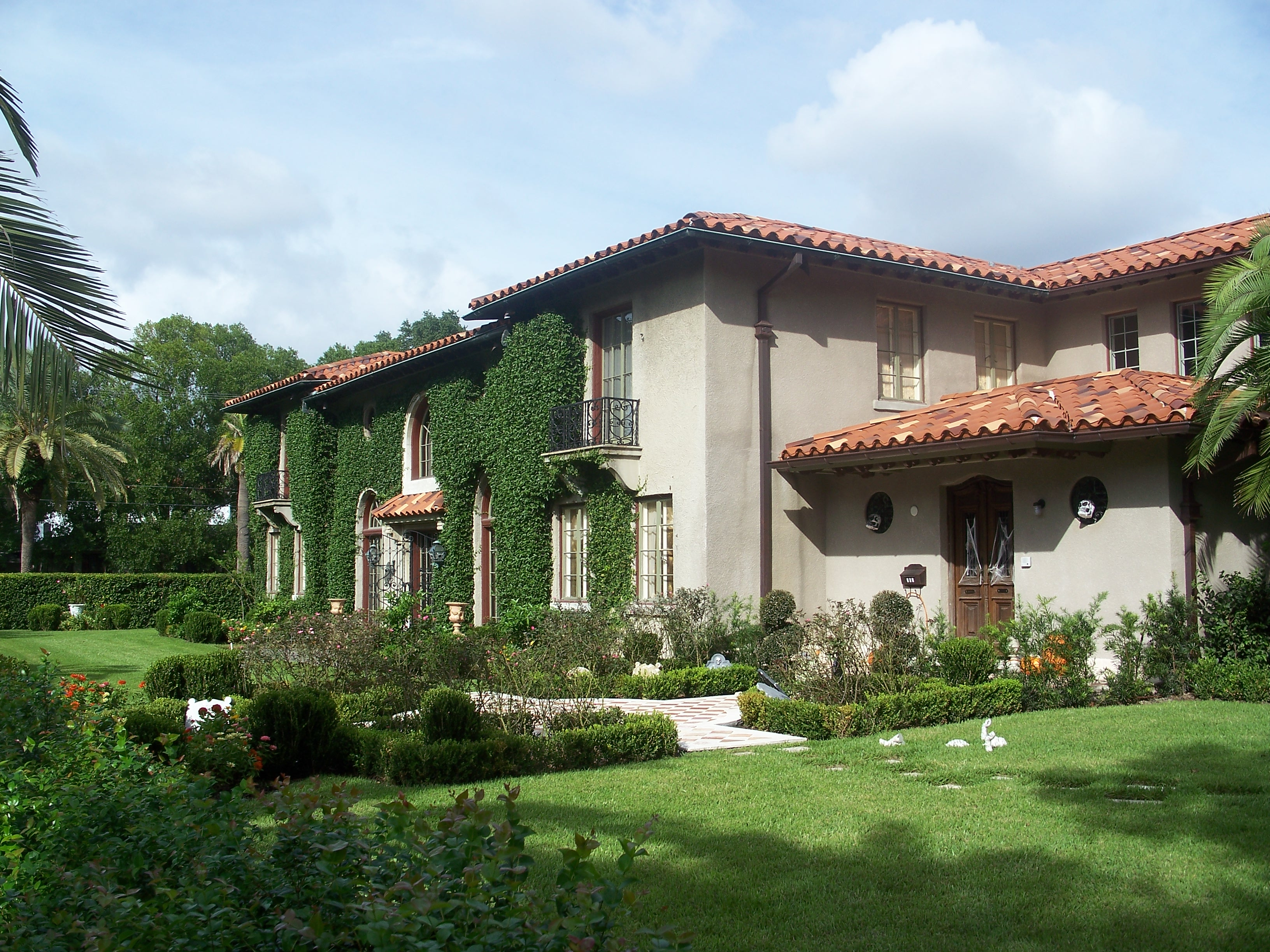

- Location within Florida Location within the United States
- Location: Tampa, Florida
- Coordinates: 27°55′27″N 82°27′34″W
- Architect: Franklin O. Adams
- Architectural style: Late 19th And 20th Century Revivals
- MPS: Mediterranean Revival Style Buildings of Davis Islands MPS
- NRHP reference No.: 89000965
- Added to NRHP: August 3, 1989

The House at 301 Caspian Street is a historic home in Tampa, Florida. It is located at 301 Caspian Street.

The house was designed by Tampa architect Franklin O. Adams for A. Y. Milam, a vice president of D. P. Davis Properties, developers of the Davis Islands. Construction began on the Mediterranean Revival style house in 1925 and was completed in 1926. Milam left Tampa after the Florida real estate bubble of the 1920s popped and sold the house in 1928.

The Milam house may be the most developed example of the Mediterranean Revival in the Davis Islands. Its architecture is further influenced by the architecture of the Italian Renaissance and is organized around a central courtyard. W. Carl Shriver of the Florida Bureau of Historic Preservation described the house as "graciously symmetrical and well-detailed without being gaudy or ostentatious."

On August 3, 1989, it was added to the United States National Register of Historic Places. Since then the next lot south has been attached to the property, followed by the construction of a matching addition.

== Gallery ==
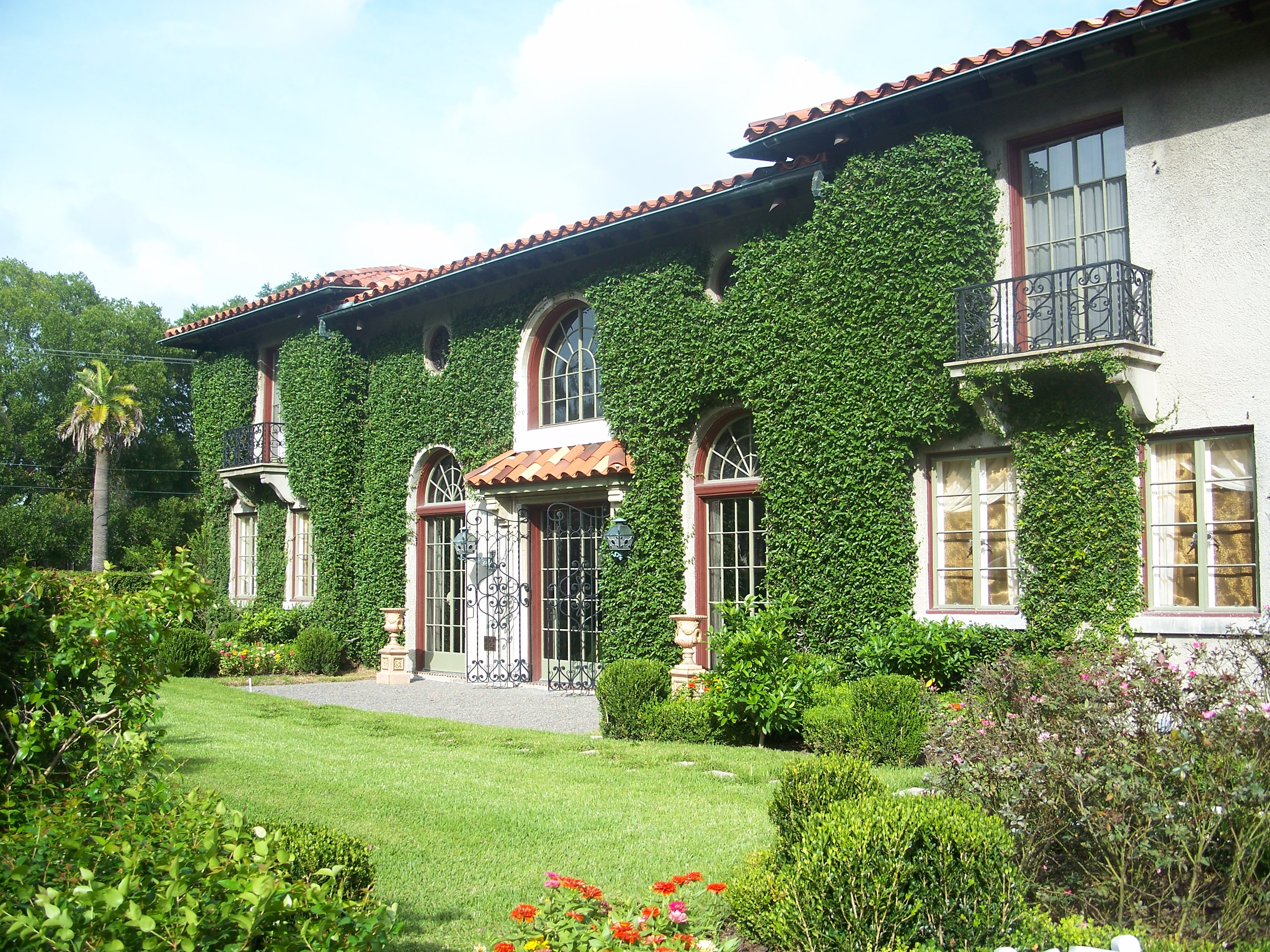

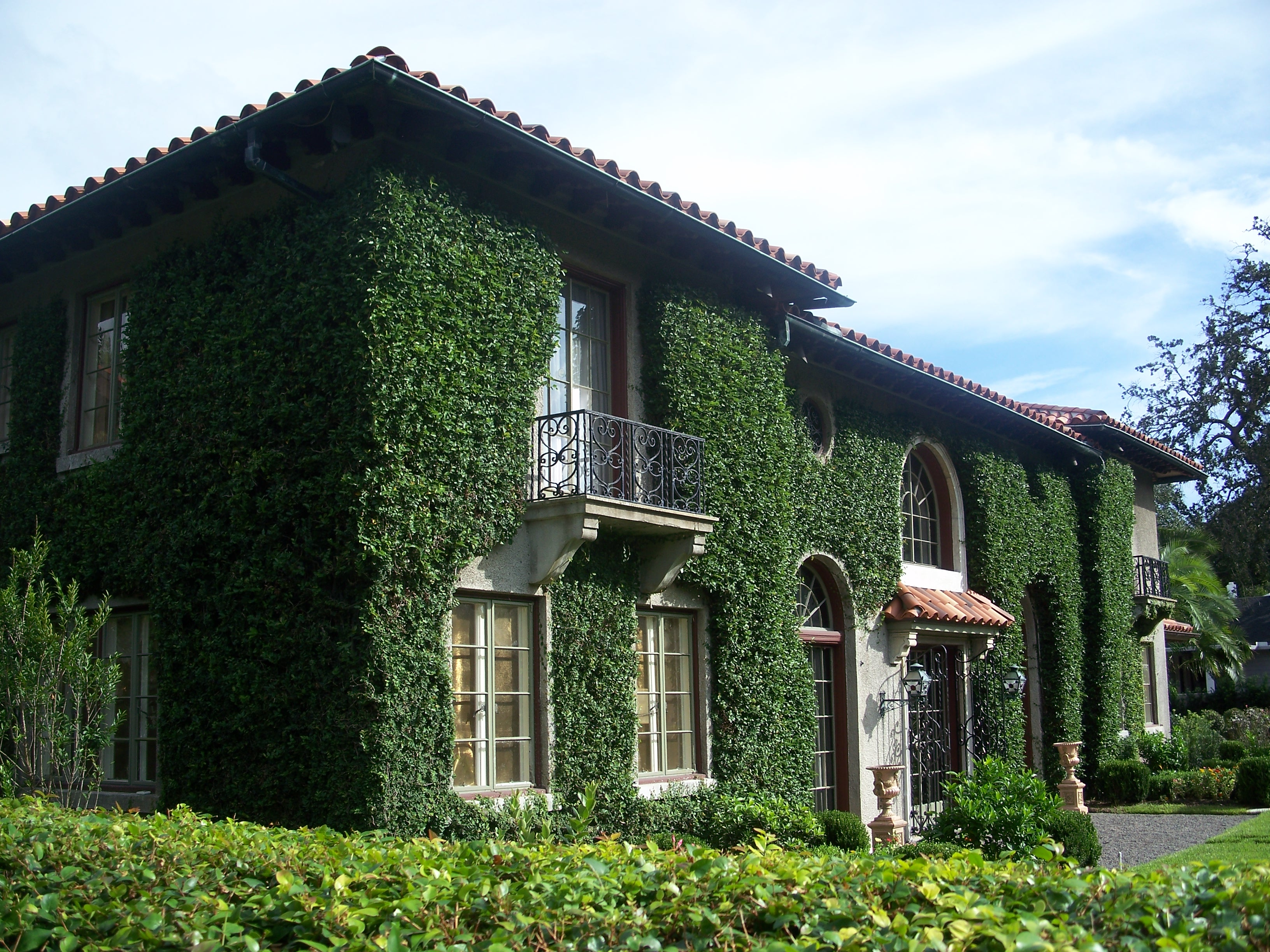

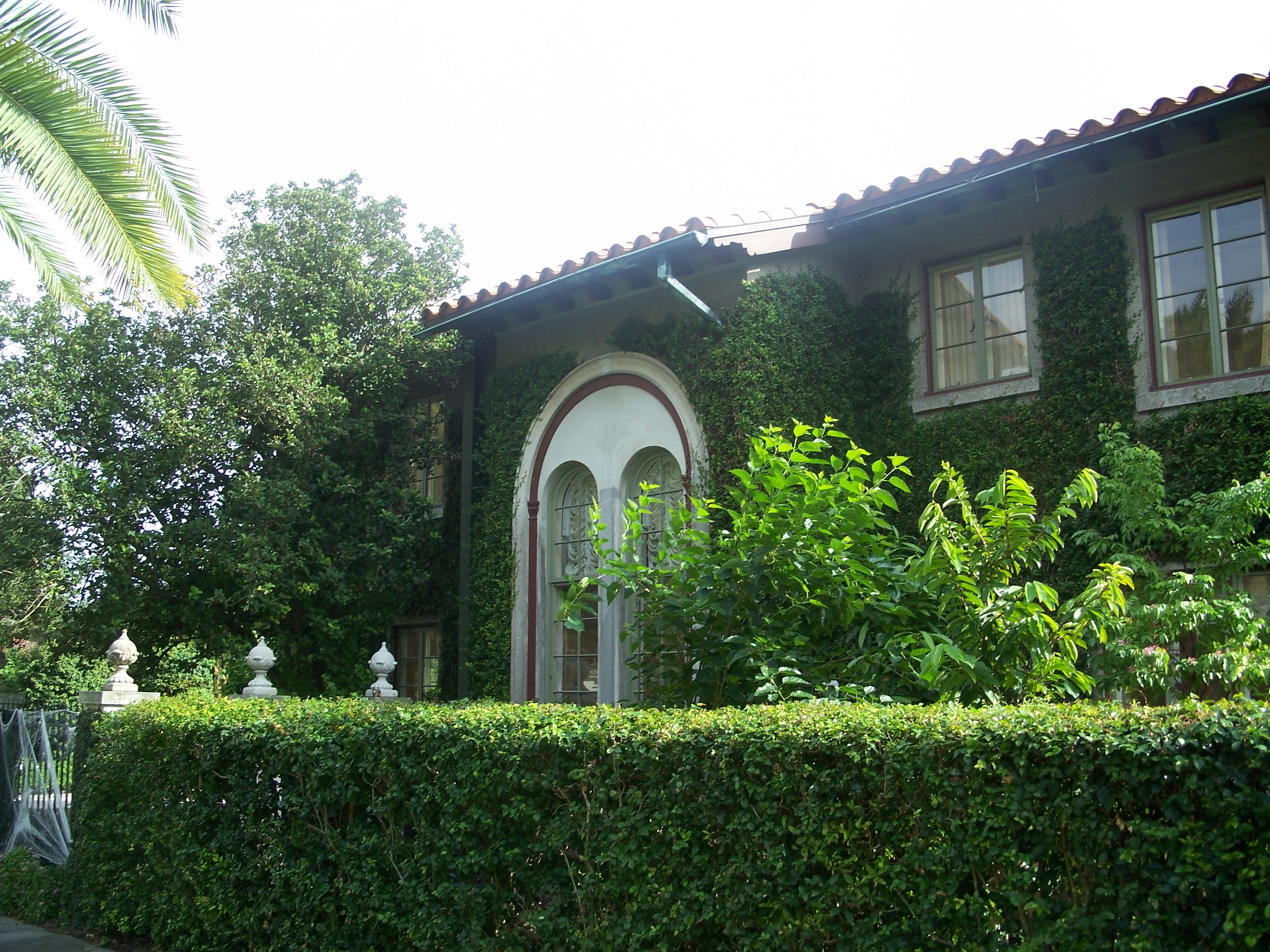
