= Bay Isle Commercial Building =

- U.S. National Register of Historic Places
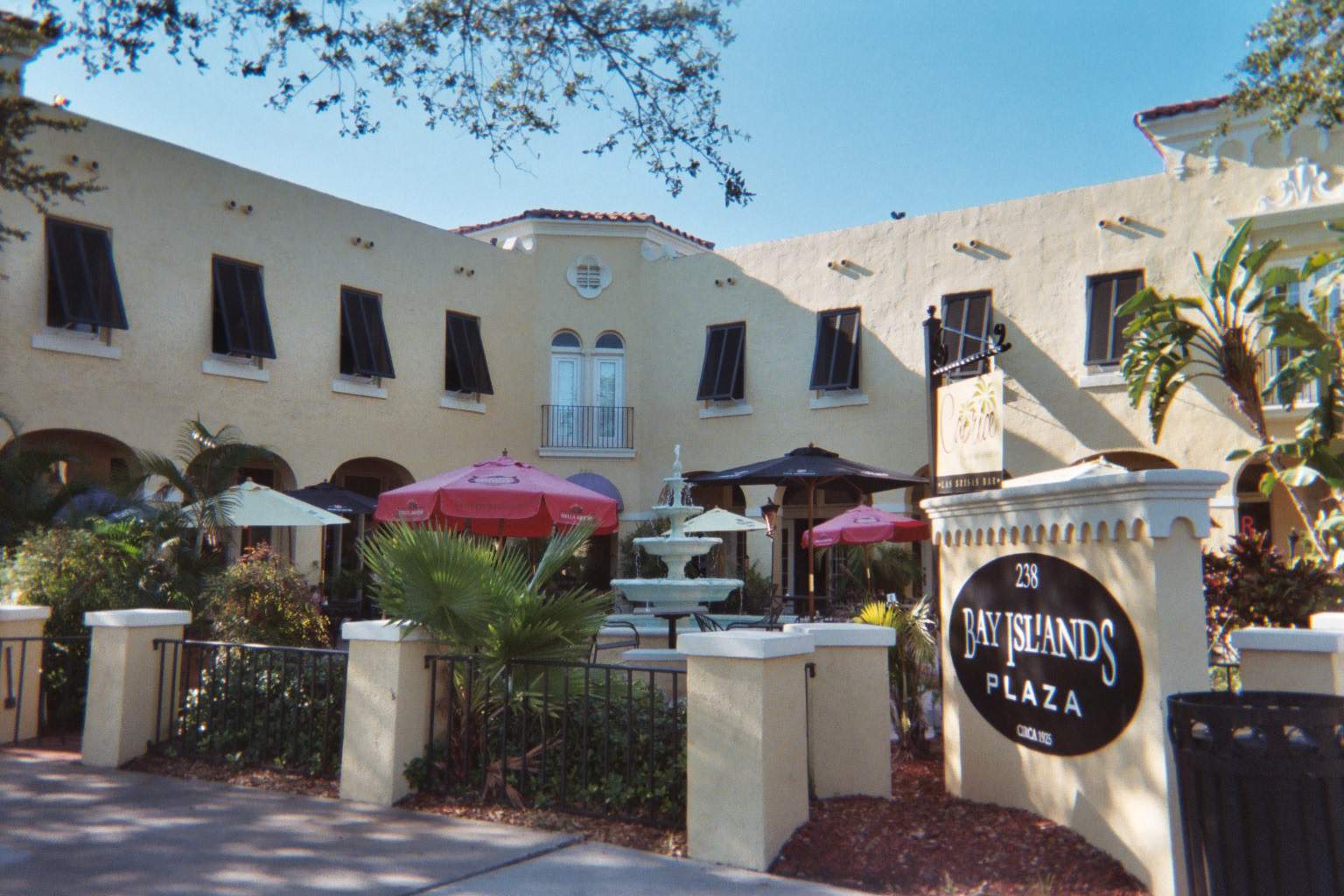
- Old Bay Isle Commercial Building, now the Bay Islands Plaza

- Location within Florida Location within the United States
- Location: 238 E. Davis Blvd., Tampa, Florida
- Coordinates: 27°55′33″N 82°27′13″W
- Area: less than one acre
- Built: 1926
- MPS: Mediterranean Revival Style Buildings of Davis Islands MPS
- NRHP reference No.: 89000971
- Added to NRHP: August 3, 1989

The Bay Isle Commercial Building is a historic site in Tampa, Florida, United States. It is located at 238 East Davis Boulevard. On August 3, 1989, it was added to the U.S. National Register of Historic Places.
