= A. Y. Milam =

American politician

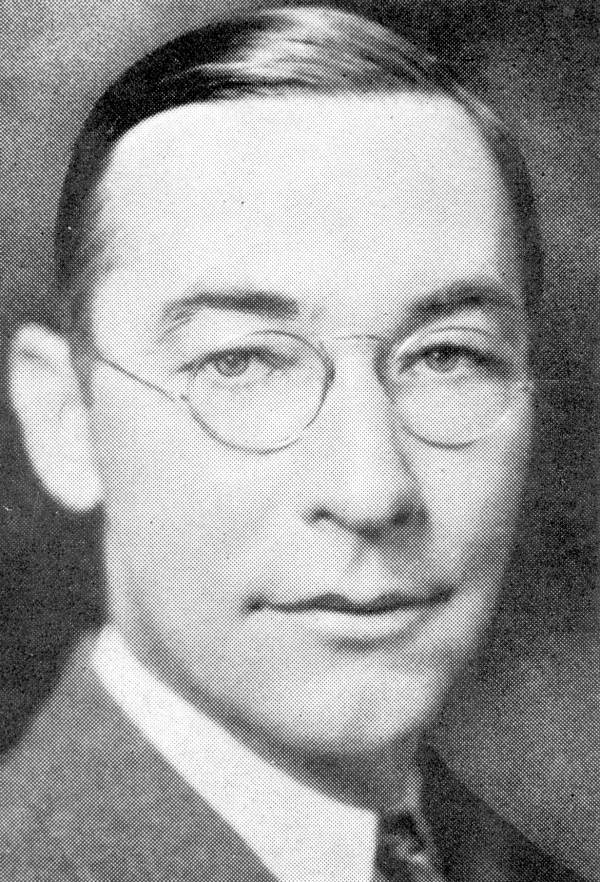
- Milam in 1900

Member of the Florida House of Representatives
- In office 1923–1925

Personal details
- Born: October 26, 1889 Leesburg, Florida, U.S.
- Died: March 26, 1956 (aged 66) Jacksonville, Florida, U.S.
- Party: Democratic

Arthur Yager Milam (October 26, 1889 – March 26, 1956) was an American lawyer, developer, and politician in the state of Florida. He was a member of the Florida House of Representatives between 1923 and 1925, becoming the Speaker of the House in 1925. He was a Democrat.

== Early life ==
Milam was born on October 16, 1889, in Leesburg, Florida. He was the son of Bob R. Milam and Lula J. Milam (née Yager). He graduated from Duval County High School and received a bachelor of science degree from John B. Stetson University in 1912. He was admitted to the U.S. Military Academy in 1907. He was later listed as a non graduate.

== Career ==
He had a law practice in Jacksonville, Florida. He was a developer of Davis Shores development on Anastasia Island with his brother R. R. Milam. The project required extensive dredging and faltered as Florida's land boom slowed in the later 1920s. A Democrat, he represented Duval County in the Florida House of Representatives in 1923 and 1925, and was Speaker of the House in 1925.

Milam was also involved in the development of the Davis Islands in Tampa as a vice president of its developer, D. P. Davis Properties. In 1926 he completed a house of his own in the development but sold it in 1928 after the collapse of the land boom. The house was listed on the National Register of Historic Places in 1989.

He died in Jacksonville, Florida, on March 26, 1956.
