= Jätkäjätkät =

Finnish hip hop, rap and reggae band

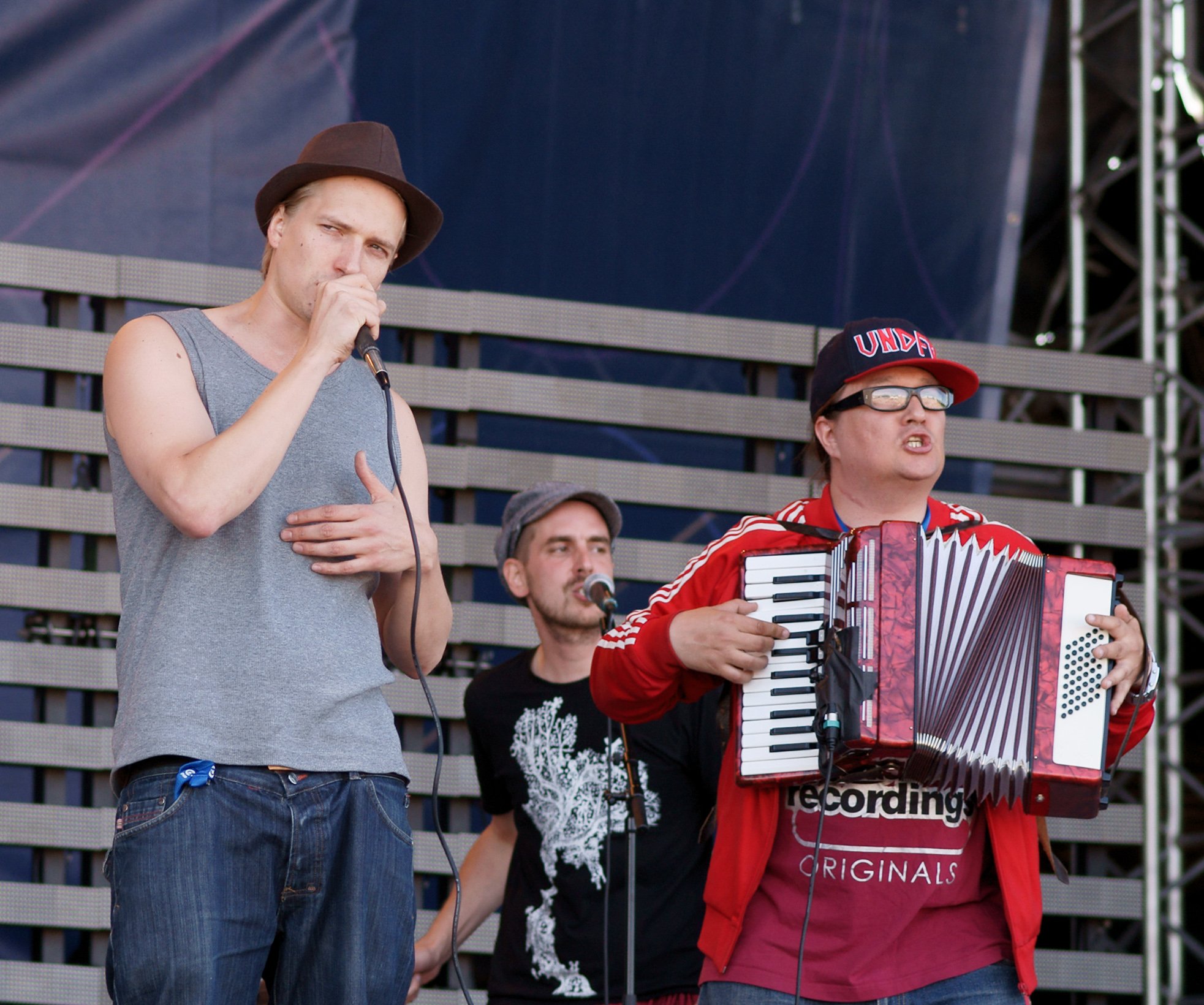
- Jätkäjätkät performing at the Pori Jazz festival in 2010

Background information
- Origin: Uusimaa, Finland
- Genres: Hip hop, rap, reggae, folk
- Years active: 2010–present
- Label: Roihis Musika
- Members: Asa; Puppa J Joska Josafat; Rasmus Pailos; Erno Haukkala; Kim Rantala; Ville Väätäinen; Pekka Varmo; Antti Kivimäki
- Past members: Kari Hulkkonen; Jocke Bachman
- Website: myspace.com/jatkajatkat

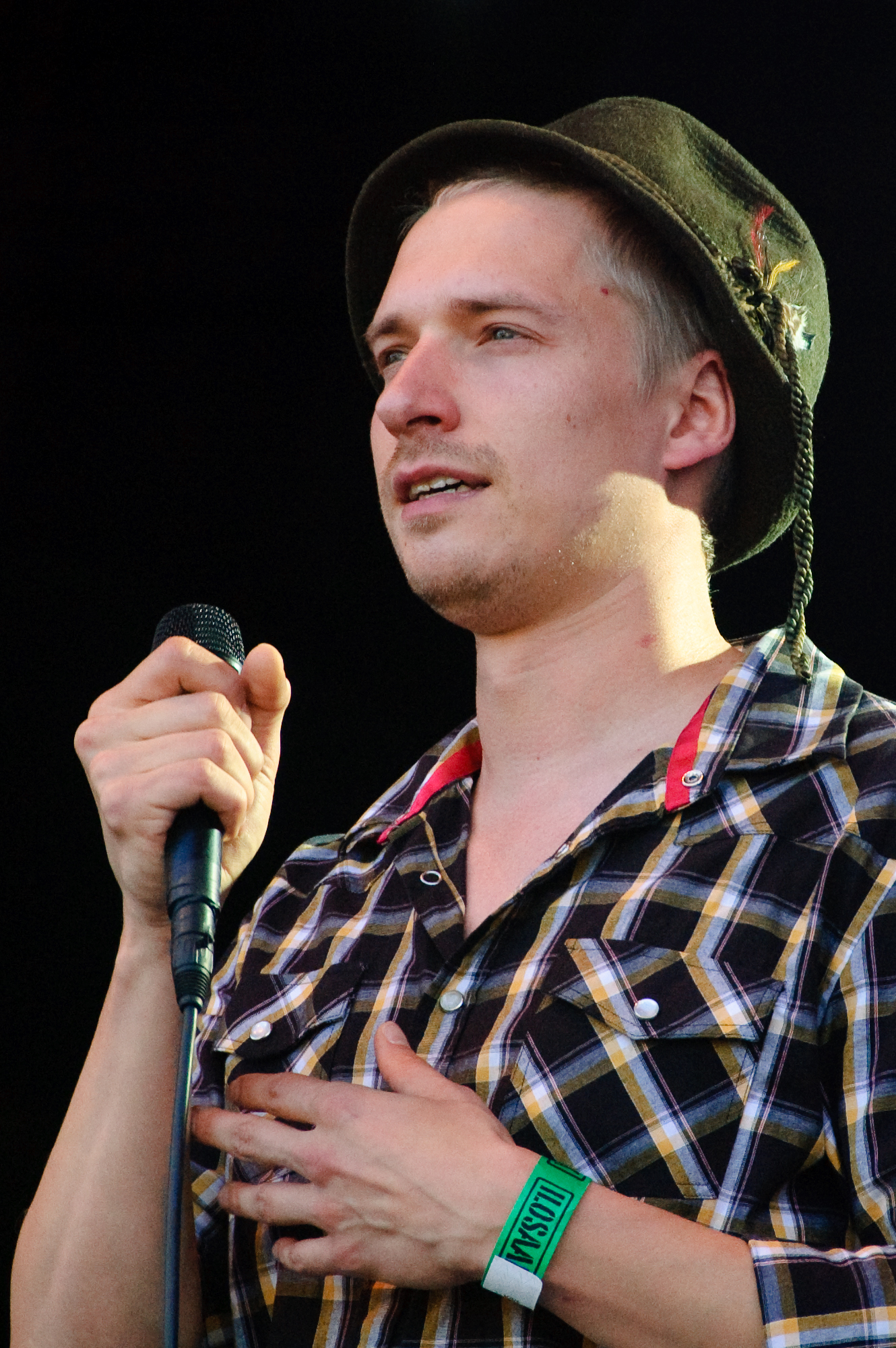
Asa performing in 2009

Jätkäjätkät is a Finnish hip hop, rap and reggae band fronted by Asa (real name Matti Salo), a well-known Finnish rapper. Initially, the formation toured as "Asa ja Jätkäjätkät" (Asa and Jätkäjätkät) before settling on just the name Jätkäjätkät. The 9-member band has released three studio albums starting with their debut Ykstoist ykstoist on 19 May 2010. The band is signed to Roihis Musika label.

== Members ==
- Asa – rapper
- Puppa J – guitar, vocals
- Joska Josafat – guitar, bouzouki, vocals
- Rasmus Pailos – accordion, percussions, vocals
- Erno Haukkala – trombone, flute
- Kim Rantala – keyboards, accordion, vocals
- Ville Väätäinen – drums
- Pekka Varmo – percussion, rap
- Antti Kivimäki – bass

Former members

- Kari Hulkkonen – bass
- Jocke Bachman – drums

== Discography ==
=== Studio albums ===
Year	Album	Charts	Certification
Year	Album	FIN	Certification
2010	Ykstoist ykstoist	6	
2011	Jatkojatkot	8	
2013	Marian sairaala	3	

== Videography ==
- 2010: "Joku saa tietää"
- 2010: "Flygareita"
- 2010: "Hutunkeitto"
- 2011: "Mammona"
- 2011: "Uusi moottoritie"
- 2012: "Saan mä elää?!"
- 2012: "Levon helmi"
