= Morton High School =

Morton High School could refer to the following schools in the United States:

- J. Sterling Morton High School District 201 — a district, or any of its three campuses, in Cook County, Illinois
- Morton High School (Morton, Illinois) — the only high school of Morton Community Unit School District 709, Tazewell County, Illinois
- Morton High School (Indiana) — a high school in the School City of Hammond in Lake County, Indiana
- Richmond High School (Richmond, Indiana) — known as Morton High School before 1939
- Morton High School (Kentucky) — a former high school in Lexington; now the Fayette County Public Schools (Kentucky) offices; replaced by Henry Clay High School in 1928
- Morton High School (Mississippi) — one of two high school facilities of Scott County School District (Mississippi)
- Morton High School (Texas) — the senior high school of Morton Independent School District in Morton, Cochran County, Texas
- Morton High School (Washington) — the high school of Morton School District 214 in Morton, Lewis County, Washington
- Oliver P. Morton High School, Hammond, Indiana
