= Lake Morton-Berrydale, Washington =

- Census-designated place
- Location of Lake Morton-Berrydale, Washington
- Coordinates: 47°19′50″N 122°07′24″W
- Country: United States
- State: Washington
- County: King

Area
  - Total: 12.5 sq mi (32.3 km^{2})
  - Land: 12.3 sq mi (31.8 km^{2})
  - Water: 0.19 sq mi (0.5 km^{2})
- Elevation: 459 ft (140 m)

Population (2020)
  - Total: 10,474
  - Density: 828/sq mi (319.6/km^{2})
- Time zone: UTC-8 (Pacific (PST))
  - Summer (DST): UTC-7 (PDT)
- FIPS code: 53-37567
- GNIS feature ID: 2408545

Lake Morton-Berrydale is a census-designated place (CDP) in King County, Washington, United States. The population was 10,474 at the 2020 census.

Based on per capita income, one of the more reliable measures of affluence, Lake Morton-Berrydale ranks 44th of 522 areas in the state of Washington to be ranked.

== Geography ==
Lake Morton-Berrydale is located in southwestern King County and is bordered to the west by the city of Auburn, to the northwest by Kent, to the north by Covington, to the northeast by Maple Valley, to the east by Black Diamond, and to the south by the Lake Holm CDP. The southern border of the Lake Morton-Berrydale CDP follows Covington Creek and Big Soos Creek, which flows west to the Green River. The namesake water body of Lake Morton is in the eastern part of the CDP, and the unincorporated community of Berrydale is in the northwest.

Washington State Route 18 forms the northwest border of the CDP, and leads northeast 17 miles (27 km) to Interstate 90 near Snoqualmie and southwest 6 miles (10 km) to Auburn. Downtown Tacoma is 20 miles (32 km) to the southwest, and downtown Seattle is 22 miles (35 km) to the northwest.

According to the United States Census Bureau, the Lake Morton-Berrydale CDP has a total area of 12.5 square miles (32.3 km^{2}), of which 12.3 square miles (31.8 km^{2}) are land and 0.2 square miles (0.5 km^{2}), or 1.60%, are water.

== Demographics ==
Historical population
Census	Pop.	Note	%±
2000	9,659		—
2010	10,160		5.2%
2020	10,474		3.1%
U.S. Decennial Census; 1990 2000 2010 2020

Lake Morton-Berrydale first appeared as a census designated place in the 2000 U.S. census formed out of a part of the part of deleted Covington-Sawyer Wilderness CDP.

=== Racial and ethnic composition ===
Lake Morton-Berrydale CDP, Washington – Racial and ethnic composition Note: the US Census treats Hispanic/Latino as an ethnic category. This table excludes Latinos from the racial categories and assigns them to a separate category. Hispanics/Latinos may be of any race.
Race / Ethnicity (NH = Non-Hispanic)	Pop 2000	Pop 2010	Pop 2020	% 2000	% 2010	% 2020
White alone (NH)	8,816	8,673	7,778	91.27%	85.36%	74.26%
Black or African American alone (NH)	83	160	206	0.86%	1.57%	1.97%
Native American or Alaska Native alone (NH)	76	88	74	0.79%	0.87%	0.71%
Asian alone (NH)	195	292	452	2.02%	2.87%	4.32%
Native Hawaiian or Pacific Islander alone (NH)	18	23	44	0.19%	0.23%	0.42%
Other race alone (NH)	26	15	65	0.27%	0.15%	0.62%
Mixed race or Multiracial (NH)	222	343	766	2.30%	3.38%	7.31%
Hispanic or Latino (any race)	223	566	1,089	2.31%	5.57%	10.40%
Total	9,659	10,160	10,474	100.00%	100.00%	100.00%

=== 2020 census ===
As of the 2020 census, Lake Morton-Berrydale had a population of 10,474. The median age was 43.6 years. 21.5% of residents were under the age of 18 and 17.7% of residents were 65 years of age or older. For every 100 females there were 102.4 males, and for every 100 females age 18 and over there were 102.8 males age 18 and over.

97.3% of residents lived in urban areas, while 2.7% lived in rural areas.

There were 3,707 households in Lake Morton-Berrydale, of which 30.3% had children under the age of 18 living in them. Of all households, 67.0% were married-couple households, 13.5% were households with a male householder and no spouse or partner present, and 13.6% were households with a female householder and no spouse or partner present. About 14.7% of all households were made up of individuals and 6.5% had someone living alone who was 65 years of age or older.

There were 3,807 housing units, of which 2.6% were vacant. The homeowner vacancy rate was 0.7% and the rental vacancy rate was 0.9%.

Racial composition as of the 2020 census
Race	Number	Percent
White	8,000	76.4%
Black or African American	216	2.1%
American Indian and Alaska Native	110	1.1%
Asian	477	4.6%
Native Hawaiian and Other Pacific Islander	49	0.5%
Some other race	504	4.8%
Two or more races	1,118	10.7%

=== 2000 census ===
As of the 2000 census, there were 9,659 people, 3,245 households, and 2,735 families residing in the CDP. The population density was 773.6 people per square mile (298.6/km^{2}). There were 3,312 housing units at an average density of 265.3/sq mi (102.4/km^{2}). The racial makeup of the CDP was 92.50% White, 0.86% African American, 0.80% Native American, 2.09% Asian, 0.19% Pacific Islander, 1.09% from other races, and 2.47% from two or more races. Hispanic or Latino of any race were 2.31% of the population.

There were 3,245 households, out of which 43.3% had children under the age of 18 living with them, 74.5% were married couples living together, 6.3% had a female householder with no husband present, and 15.7% were non-families. 11.6% of all households were made up of individuals, and 2.6% had someone living alone who was 65 years of age or older. The average household size was 2.98 and the average family size was 3.21.

In the CDP the population was spread out, with 29.1% under the age of 18, 6.4% from 18 to 24, 29.1% from 25 to 44, 28.7% from 45 to 64, and 6.6% who were 65 years of age or older. The median age was 38 years. For every 100 females there were 105.5 males. For every 100 females age 18 and over, there were 103.9 males.

The median income for a household in the CDP was $75,337, and the median income for a family was $80,516. Males had a median income of $54,151 versus $36,101 for females. The per capita income for the CDP was $28,980. About 0.5% of families and 1.7% of the population were below the poverty line, including none of those under age 18 and 3.6% of those age 65 or over.
