= Lake Morton (Washington) =

Lake in King County, Washington

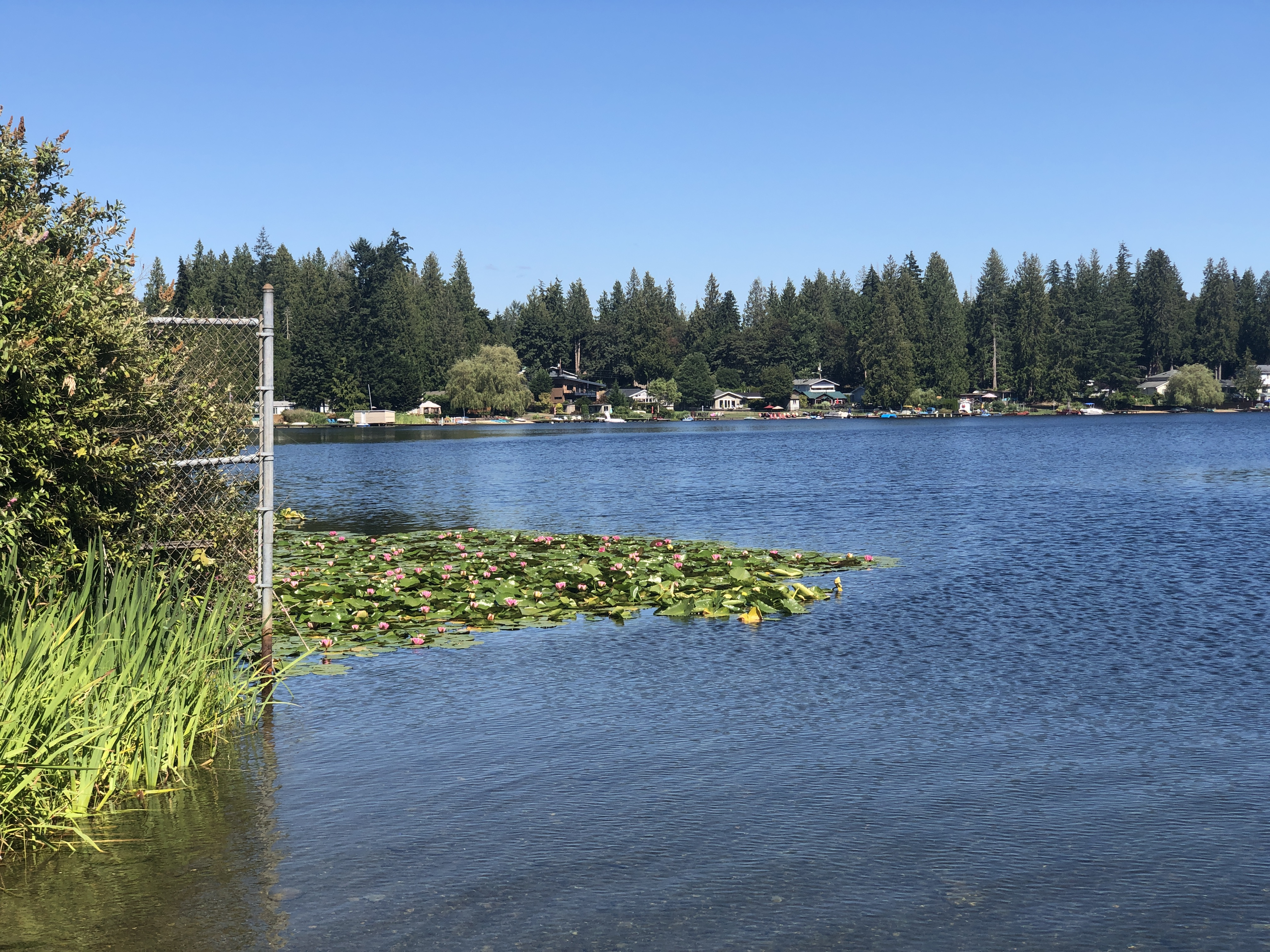
- View across Lake Morton

- Location within Washington (state) Location within the United States
- Location: Lake Morton-Berrydale, Washington
- Coordinates: 47.324354°N 122.084616°W
- Basin countries: United States
- Surface area: 66.30 acres (26.83 ha)
- Max. depth: 23 ft (7.0 m)
- Surface elevation: 526 ft (160 m)

Lake Morton is a lake located in King County, Washington, in the Lake Morton-Berrydale census-designated place.

== Description ==
Lake Morton allows fishing, and is stocked with rainbow trout annually by the Washington Department of Fish and Wildlife. Largemouth bass are also naturally present in the lake. There is a public boat ramp and fishing area on the northwest shore of the lake, but the lake is mostly surrounded by private property. Lake Morton is encircled by Lake Morton Drive.

King County has measured water quality in Morton Lake since 1996 (except for a gap between 2008 and 2014). Measurements indicate generally high water quality, at borderline oligotrophic-mesotrophic levels.

== Plane crash ==
On November 11, 2019, a small, single-engine plane crashed into Lake Morton. The pilot was rescued by kayakers, and taken to a hospital.

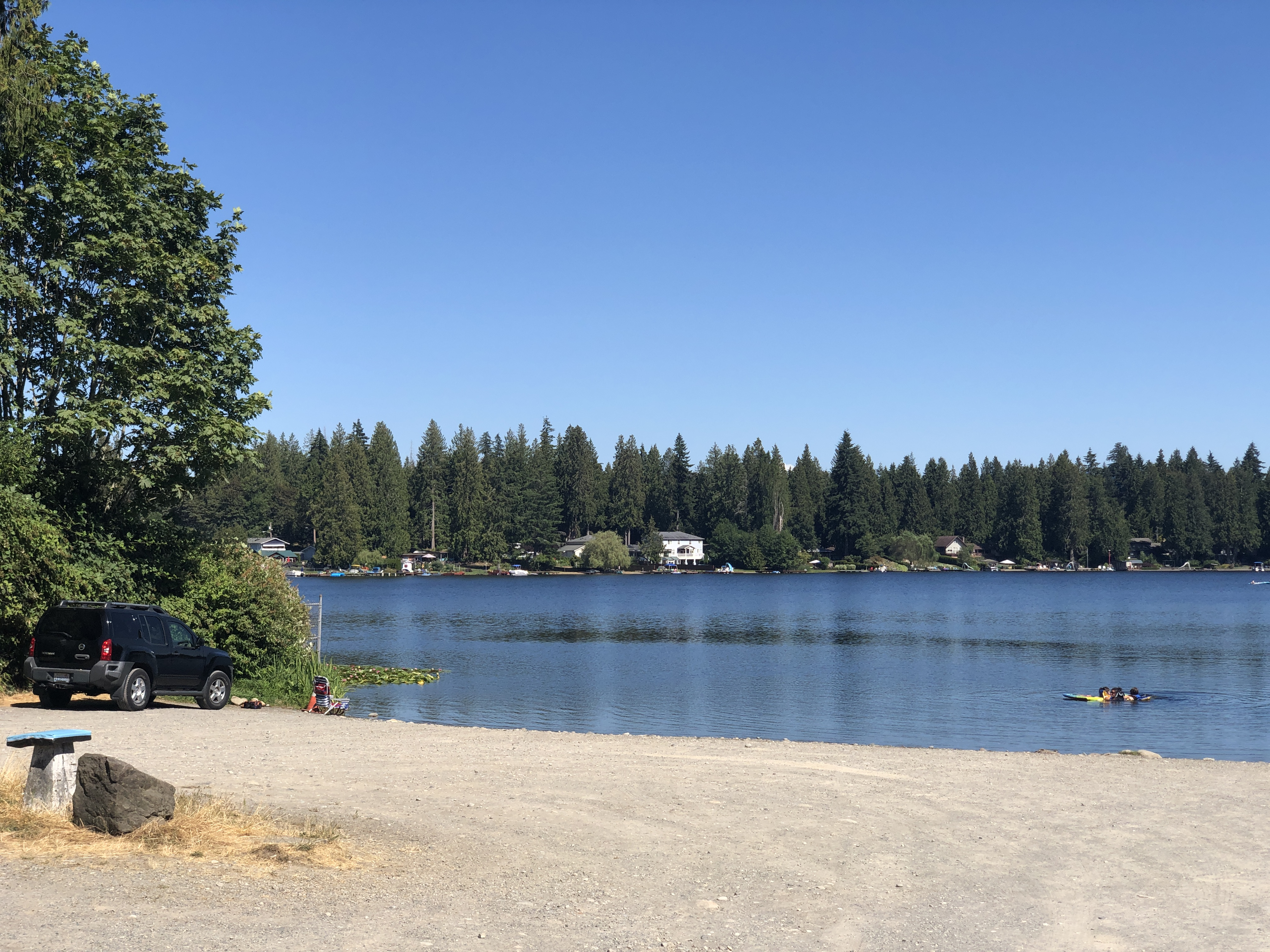
View from the WDFW public fishing area
