= Lake Morton (Florida) =

Lake in the state of Florida, United States

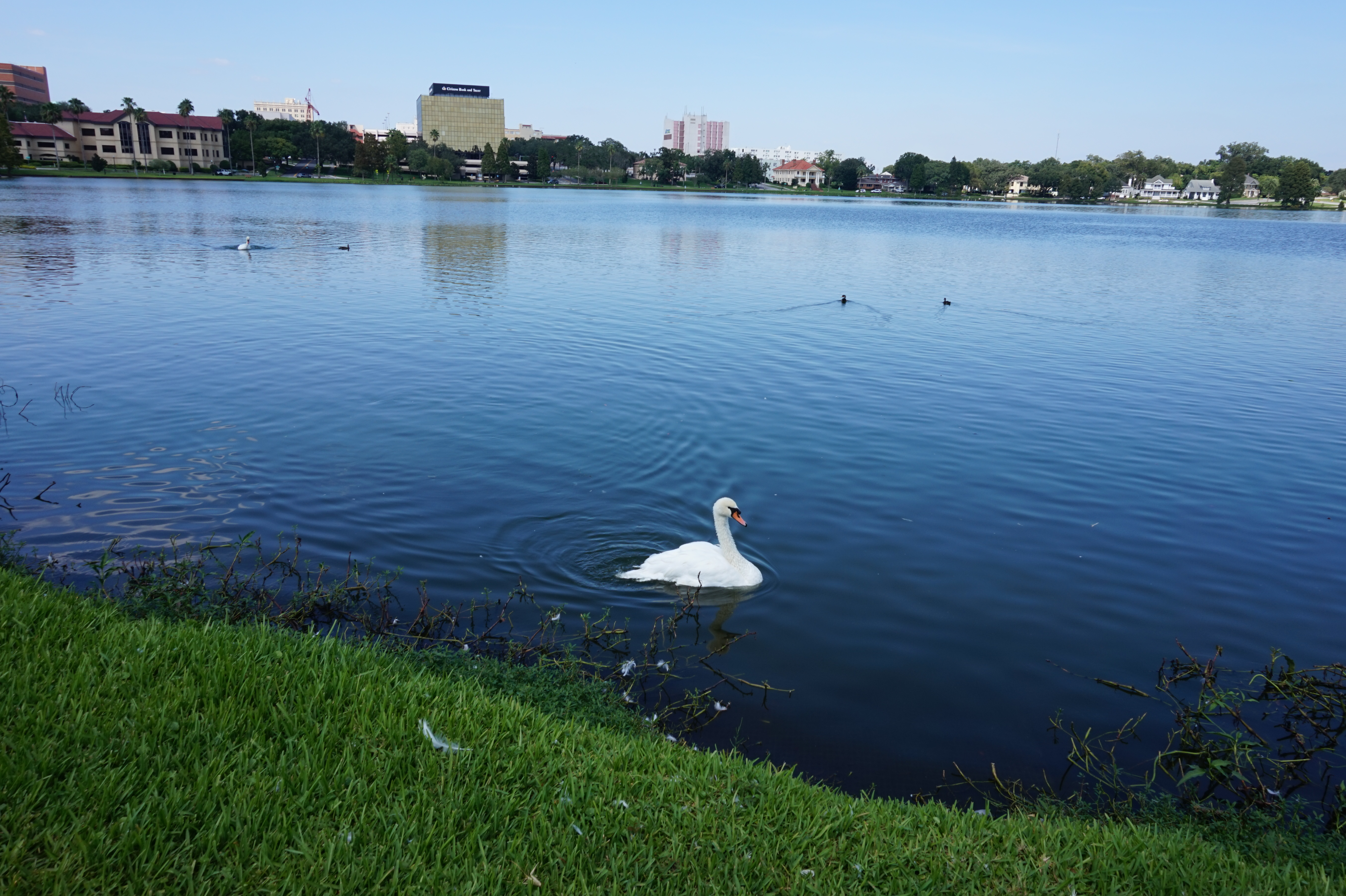

- Location within Florida
- Location: Polk County, Florida
- Coordinates: 28°02′17″N 81°57′11″W
- Type: lake

Lake Morton is a lake in Lakeland, Polk County, Florida, in the United States. The lake is named for John P. Morton, who owned land near the lake.

It is famous for a flock of captive swans that are kept at the lake, primarily black and mute swans.
