= Hutchinson House =

Hutchinson House, Hutchinson Homestead, or Hutchinson Farm, may refer to:

- L.D. Hutchinson House, Floyd, Arkansas, listed on the National Register of Historic Places (NRHP)
- Hutchinson Ranch, Poncha Springs, Colorado, and Salida, Colorado, listed on the NRHP in Chaffee County
- Parker-Hutchinson Farm, Coventry, Connecticut, NRHP-listed
- Hutchinson House (Tampa, Florida), NRHP-listed
- Perry Hutchinson House, Marysville, Kansas, listed on the NRHP in Marshall County
- Dyer-Hutchinson Farm, Cape Elizabeth, Maine, NRHP-listed
- Farley-Hutchinson-Kimball House, Bedford, Massachusetts, NRHP-listed
- Gov. Thomas Hutchinson's Ha-ha, Milton, Massachusetts, NRHP-listed
- Hutchinson-Blood House, Winchester, Massachusetts, NRHP-listed
- John Hutchinson House, Faribault, Minnesota, listed on the NRHP in Rice County
- Hutchinson House (Alstead, New Hampshire), NRHP-listed
- Hutchinson Homestead, Cayuga, New York, NRHP-listed
- Gen. Orrin Hutchinson House, Onondaga, New York, NRHP-listed
- Chapman-Hutchinson House, Dublin, Ohio, listed on the NRHP in Franklin County
- Hutchinson Farm (Elizabeth, Pennsylvania), NRHP-listed
- Hutchinson House (Edisto Island, South Carolina), NRHP-listed
