= Hyde Park (Tampa) =

- Neighborhood
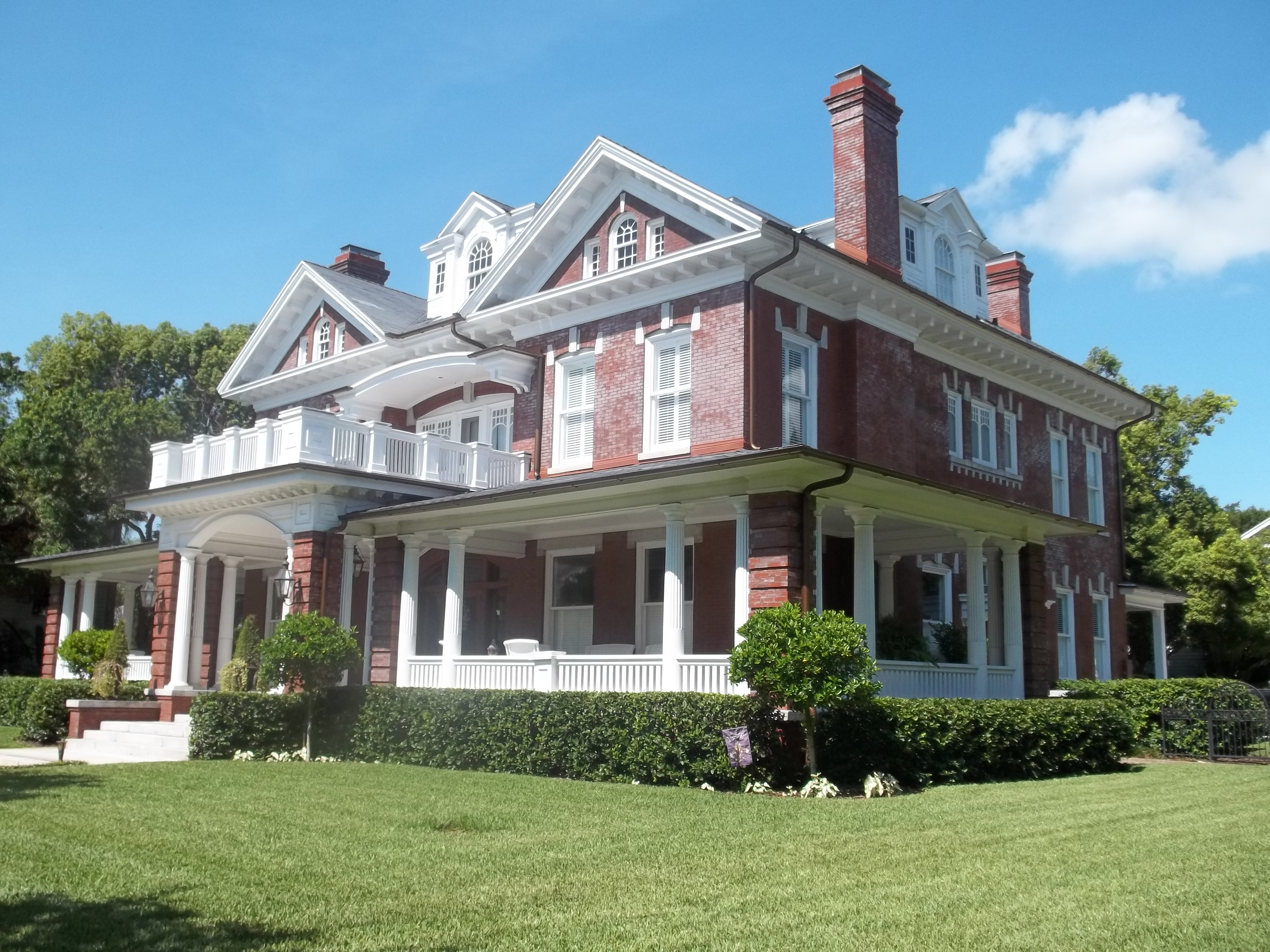
- Home in the Hyde Park Historic District.

- Location within the state of Florida
- Coordinates: 27°56′13″N 82°28′32″W
- Country: United States
- State: Florida
- County: Hillsborough
- City: Tampa
- Time zone: UTC-5 (Eastern (EST))
  - Summer (DST): UTC-4 (EDT)
- ZIP codes: 33606

Hyde Park is a historic neighborhood and district within the city limits of Tampa. It includes Bayshore Boulevard, Hyde Park Village and SoHo. Its ZIP code is 33606. Hyde Park includes many historic homes and bungalows. Its history and proximity to downtown Tampa make it a desirable residential neighborhood. Because of its convenient location, developments are being built in Hyde Park. Construction includes an expansion of Hyde Park Village, an upscale shopping and dining destination, as well as multifamily residential developments.

== Description ==
Hyde Park is adjacent to the University of Tampa and Downtown. Roughly, the boundaries of the neighborhood are the Hillsborough Bay to the east, Kennedy Blvd to the north, Bayshore Boulevard to the east and south, and Armenia Avenue to the west. Major thoroughfares within the historical district include Kennedy Boulevard, Bayshore Boulevard, Lee Roy Selmon Expressway (SR 618), Howard Avenue, and Swann Avenue. Entrepreneurs have started small companies using NEVs to shuttle pedestrians from the area to other core districts such as Downtown and Ybor City, as an attempt to facilitate connection between Tampa's core neighborhoods.

== History ==
The Hyde Park neighborhood was established in the 1880s when railroad financier Henry B. Plant built the first bridge across the Hillsborough River at Lafayette Street (now Kennedy Boulevard). The first house in the neighborhood was built by James Watrous in 1882 at 1307 Morrison Avenue.

Growth occurred rapidly and a street car line was put in on Swann Ave and Rome Ave. This is the reason for the wideness of the two streets, while most in the neighborhood are much narrower. The area where Old Hyde Park Village is today was originally called Cork Avenue. Dakota Avenue, Cork Avenue, and Inman Avenue all intersected near where the infamous British phone booth stood. The only extant part of Cork Avenue is called Snow Avenue.

== Bayshore Boulevard ==
Bayshore marks the eastern boundary of the neighborhood. The street is known for its scenic, gently curving greenway and views of the water and skyline. It previously held the record as the world's longest sidewalk.

== Hyde Park Village ==
Upscale shopping district located among several city and residential blocks. The approximate center is at the intersection of Swann and Rome Avenues just a few blocks east of the adjacent South Howard Avenue residential and retail district known as SoHo. High-end boutiques, restaurants and cafes are some offerings of the area. Additionally, a SoulCycle opened in 2019.

== SoHo ==
Multi-faceted entertainment district in the middle of the neighborhood. Many of the region's top-rated bars, nightclubs, boutiques and restaurants are in this district. It begins at Howard Avenue south of Kennedy Boulevard and terminates at Bayshore. Its name is derived factually since the district centers around South Howard Avenue.

== See also ==
- Davis Islands
- Hyde Park Historic Districts
- Palma Ceia
- West Tampa
- Ybor City
