= Hyde Park Historic District =

Hyde Park Historic District may refer to:

- Hyde Park Historic Districts, in Tampa Florida, listed on the NRHP in Florida
- Hyde Park, Boise, Idaho, also called Hyde Park Historic District, in Boise, Idaho, listed on the NRHP in Idaho
- Hyde Park-Kenwood Historic District, Chicago, Illinois, listed on the NRHP in South Side Chicago, Illinois
- Hyde Park Historic District (Kansas City, Missouri), listed on the NRHP in Jackson County, Missouri
- Old Hyde Park East Historic District, Kansas City, Missouri, listed on the NRHP in Jackson County, Missouri
- Old Hyde Park West Historic District, Kansas City, Missouri, listed on the NRHP in Jackson County, Missouri
- South Hyde Park Historic District, Kansas City, Missouri, listed on the NRHP in Jackson County, Missouri
- Hyde Park Historic District (Austin, Texas), NRHP-listed
