= Soho (Tampa) =

SoHo Tampa
- Neighborhood
- Location within the state of Florida
- Coordinates: 27°56′13″N 82°28′59″W
- Country: United States
- State: Florida
- County: Hillsborough
- City: Tampa
- Time zone: UTC-5 (Eastern (EST))
  - Summer (DST): UTC-4 (EDT)
- Area code: 813

SoHo is a residential district within the Hyde Park neighborhood of Tampa. Its name is an abbreviation of "South [of] Howard", and came after SoHo, Manhattan. Its cross streets include Kennedy Boulevard (SoHo's starting point), Cleveland Street, Platt Street, and Swann Avenue. The area has historic architecture and is within walking distance of Bayshore Boulevard where it terminates two miles away from the entertainment district.

Bern's Steak House is located in the district, along with other high-end restaurants and nightlife venues, locally-owned clothing boutiques, art galleries, dessert cafes, and a Starbucks. One of only three Publix GreenWise Markets is also located in the district. As of 2009, small companies have sprung up utilizing NEVs to shuttle clubgoers between core neighborhoods including SoHo and Channelside.

In 2009, a small park dedicated to Bern Laxer, late founder of Bern's Steakhouse, opened at the southern part of the district. At the center of the park is the "Three Graces" sculpture and a lighted fountain that is the first in Tampa to use reclaimed water.

== See also ==
- Channelside
- Columbus Drive (Tampa)
- Davis Islands
- Downtown Tampa
- Grand Central, similar district across the bay in St. Pete
- Harbour Island
- Howard Avenue (Tampa)
- Hyde Park Village, shopping district a few blocks over
- Palma Ceia, neighborhood's "Design District" contains similar high-end dining and shopping
- Ybor City
