= Howard Avenue =

Howard Avenue may refer to:

- Howard Avenue (Windsor, Ontario), Canada
- Howard Avenue (Tampa), Florida
- Howard Avenue (New Haven), Connecticut
- Howard Avenue (New Orleans), Louisiana
