= Fort Homer W. Hesterly Armory =

Building in Florida, United States

- Fort Homer W. Hesterly National Guard Armory
- U.S. National Register of Historic Places
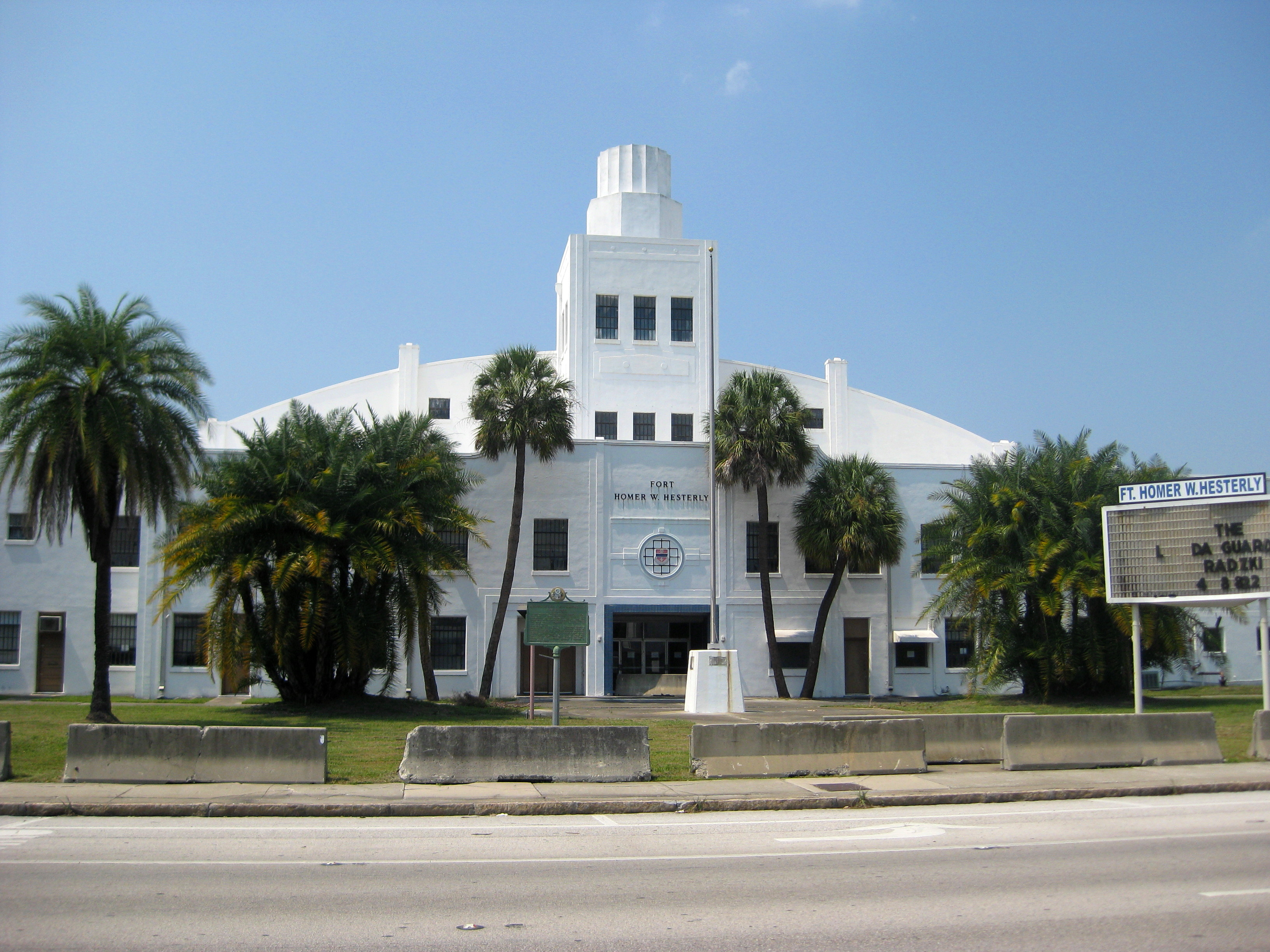

- Location within Florida Location within the United States
- Location: Tampa, Florida
- Coordinates: 27.949525°N 82.484016°W
- NRHP reference No.: 13000852
- Added to NRHP: October 23, 2013

Fort Homer W. Hesterly is a historic building at 522 North Howard Avenue in the West Tampa section of Tampa, Florida. The building and adjacent support structures were originally constructed as a U.S. military facility to house units of both the Florida Army National Guard and the U.S. Army Reserve. The armory was built in the 1930s under Franklin Delano Roosevelt's New Deal and dedicated the day after the Pearl Harbor attack. The National Guard used the armory until 2005.

After sixty years of service, and with the facility becoming obsolete for military purposes, Florida National Guard and U.S. Army Reserve officials announced plans to replace the armory on December 1, 2001. A new 216,424-square-foot (20,106.4 m^{2}) joint reserve facility to be built at Gateway Center in Pinellas Park was planned as a replacement of three existing outdated and overcrowded facilities, including Fort Hesterly, the J.F. Campbell National Guard Armory in Clearwater, and the Lovejoy U.S. Army Reserve Center in Tampa. Construction of the new $53.5 million project began in 2002, with the House Appropriations Committee originally allocating $45 million for the project. The new facility, eventually named the C.W. "Bill" Young Armed Forces Reserve Center, opened in February 2005.

On October 23, 2013, the armory was added to the National Register of Historic Places.

== Entertainment and sports uses ==
During the time that the armory was used by the National Guard and the Army Reserve, it was also used as an entertainment and sports venue.

In 1955 Elvis Presley performed at the armory as part of the "Country Music's Mr. Rhythm" show, the final act in country star Hank Snow's All-Star Jamboree tour. The cover of Presley's debut album features a photo from his 1955 performance at the armory.

Other performers at the armory included Tom Jones, The Beach Boys, The Animals, James Brown, Buddy Holly, Andy Griffith, Allman Brothers, Pink Floyd, the Doors and The Ramones.

The armory was used by President John F. Kennedy for an address to the Florida Chamber of Commerce in 1963, four days before his assassination in Dallas. The Rev. Martin Luther King Jr. also spoke at the armory.

The South Florida Bulls men's basketball team played home games at the armory sporadically throughout the 1970s.

The armory held Championship Wrestling from Florida matches during the era of Dusty Rhodes, Jack Brisco and announcer Gordon Solie. Billy Fives and Pepe Prado represented NWA Florida at the armory in a tag team match against Mike Sullivan and Scoot Andrews during an interpromotional event between IPW Hardcore vs. NWA Florida.

In addition, many graduations and weddings have been held at the Fort.

== Redevelopment ==
An art deco style building, it took ten years to find an occupant for the Hesterly Armory, once a premiere entertainment venue in addition to its military role. Plans for the former armory included a film studio and creative industries incubator, an ice rink and sports complex, and mixed-use commercial/residential development. In 2007, a $98 million hotel and spa project won the selection process, but later dropped. A plan to redevelop the 75,000 square foot armory into a luxury development fell through in 2010.

In 2016, it underwent a $30 million renovation and was converted into the Bryan Glazer Family Jewish Community Center in honor of Bryan Glazer (son of Malcolm Glazer) who contributed $4 million to the project. It is now home to the Tampa Jewish Community Center & Federation.
