= West Tampa Historic District =

Historic district in Florida, United States

- U.S. National Register of Historic Places
- U.S. Historic district
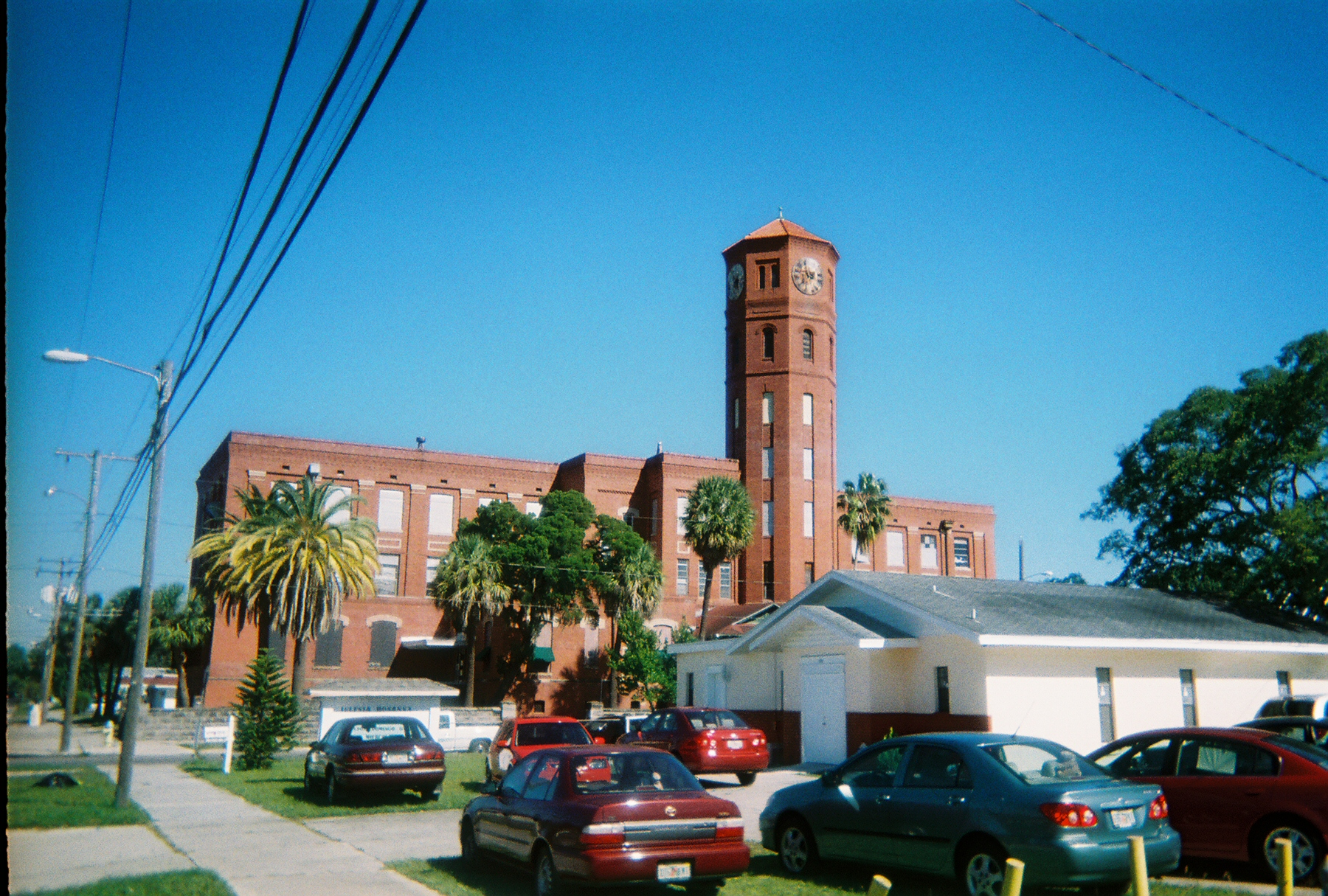
- Old cigar factory in the district

- Location within Florida Location within the United States
- Location: Roughly bounded by Cypress and Ivy Sts., Fremont and Habana Aves., Tampa, Florida
- Coordinates: 27°57′34″N 82°29′2″W
- Area: 273 acres (110 ha)
- Built: 1893
- Architectural style: Bungalow/craftsman, Renaissance, Queen Anne
- NRHP reference No.: 83003539
- Added to NRHP: October 18, 1983

The West Tampa Historic District is a U.S. historic district situated in the larger neighborhood of West Tampa in the city of Tampa, Florida. It is bounded by Cypress and Ivy Streets, Fremont and Habana Avenues, encompasses approximately 273 acres (1.10 km^{2}), and contains 908 historic buildings. On October 18, 1983, it was added to the National Register of Historic Places.
