= Hyde Park Village =

Shopping district

Coordinates: 27°56′10″N 82°28′33″W

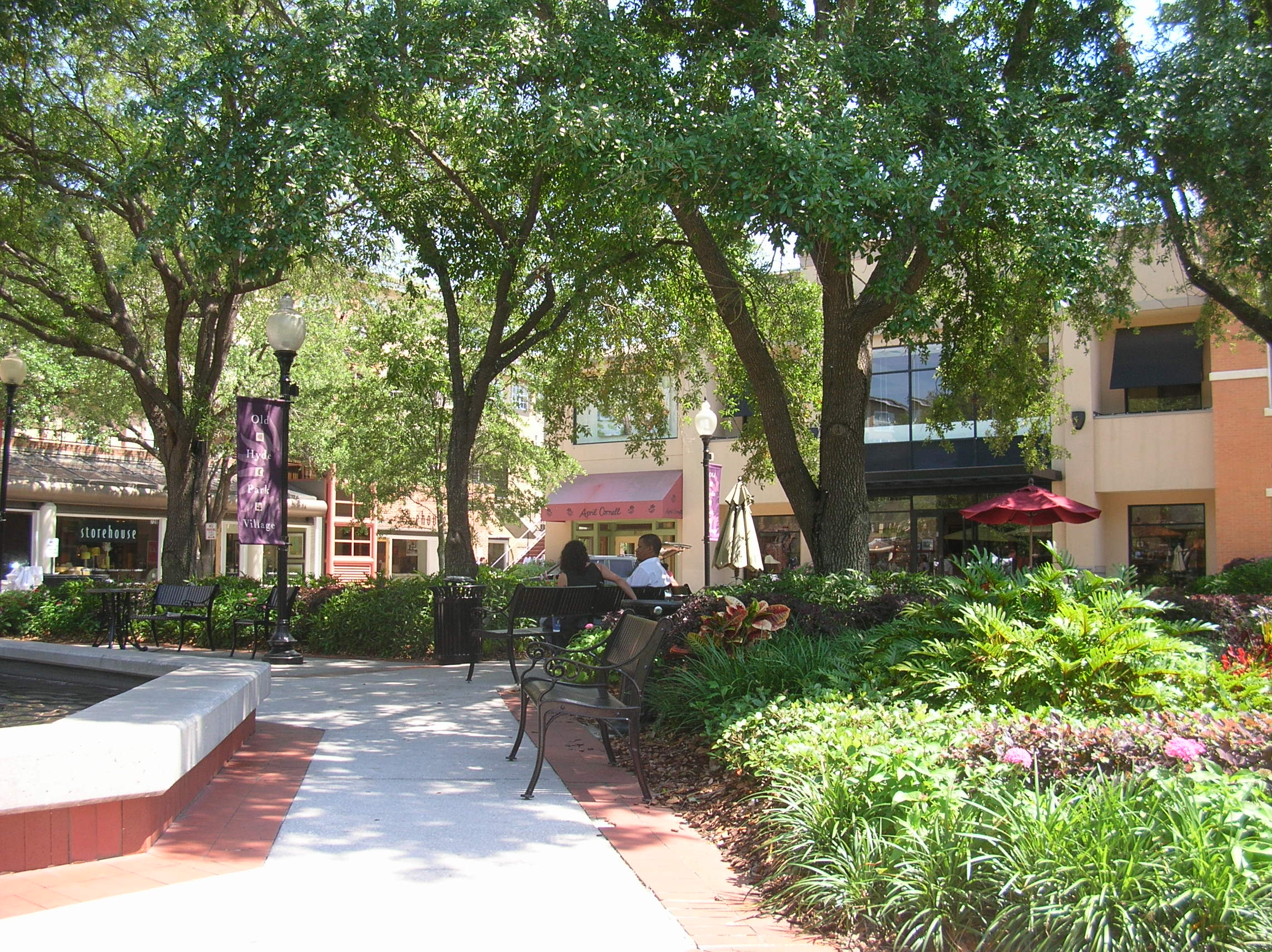
Hyde Park Village

Hyde Park Village is an upscale open-air shopping district located in the neighborhood of Hyde Park in Tampa, Florida, United States. The center is situated in several buildings located between Swann and Rome Avenues, just a few blocks east of the SoHo district.

The shops include national retailers such as Anthropologie, Zimmermann, Madewell, and Kendra Scott, as well as a number of local boutiques and independent vendors. Hyde Park is also home to a variety of dining establishments, including Meat Market, On Swann, and Forbici.

== History ==
Hyde Park Village opened in 1985 as an upscale open-air shopping center, with anchors including Jacobson's and AMC Theatres, and by the 1990s had many national tenants including Polo Ralph Lauren, Williams Sonoma, Restoration Hardware, The Sharper Image, Banana Republic, and The Gap. However the mall had begun to suffer by the 2000s, most crippled by the opening of International Plaza in 2001. A Cobb Theatres CineBistro opened in late 2009, however the center was largely quiet until its sale to WS Development in 2013. WS Development revealed early plans for redevelopment in 2014. Plans were submitted in early 2015, with plans for Phase 1 to be finished by Spring 2016. Work for Phase 2 began in early 2017. Tenants in "Block H", the final block to be developed, including Meat Market and Station House, opened in Summer 2019.

== See also ==
- Channelside
- Palma Ceia Design District
- West Park Village
- Ybor City
