= International Plaza and Bay Street =

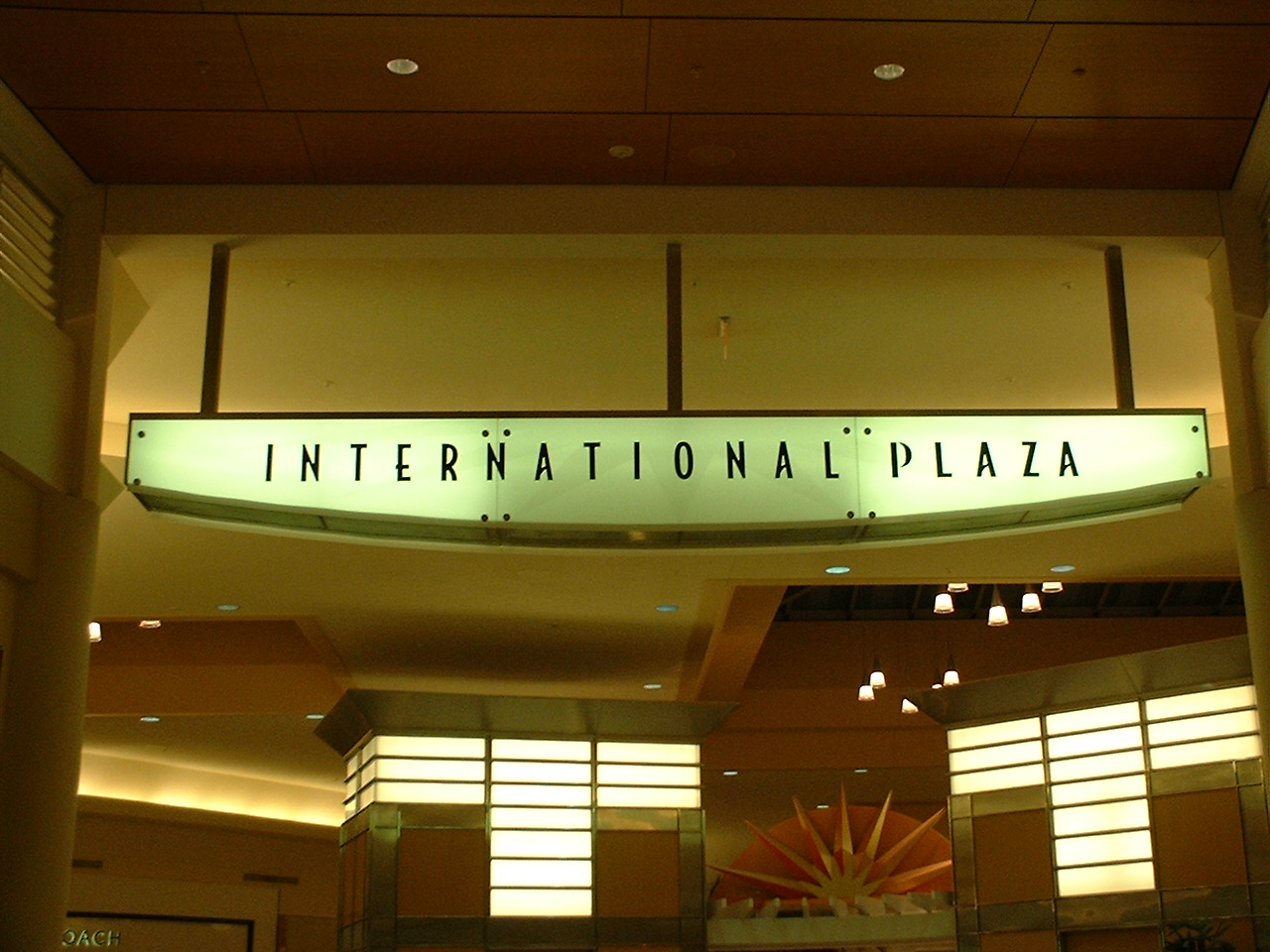
- Location: Tampa, Florida, U.S.
- Coordinates: 27.964447°N 82.520748°W
- Address: 2223 N. Westshore Blvd
- Opened: September 14, 2001; 25 years ago
- Developer: Taubman Centers
- Manager: Simon Property Group
- Owner: Simon Property Group
- Num. of stores: 200
- Num. of anchor tenants: 4
- Floor area: 1,253,000 sq ft (116,400 m^{2})
- Floors: 2 (3 in Dillard's)
- Parking: Surface lot, 2 parking garages, and valet.
- Website: www.simon.com/mall/international-plaza

International Plaza and Bay Street is a large, upscale shopping mall and dining destination located adjacent to the Tampa International Airport. The mall is anchored by Dillard's, Neiman Marcus, Nordstrom, and Dick's House of Sport.

Bay Street, a more modern open-air shopping center, is anchored by Restoration Hardware, and primarily features restaurants including The Capital Grille, The Cheesecake Factory, and Bar Louie among others. A Renaissance Hotel, with 293 rooms and 12,500 square feet (1,160 m^{2}) of meeting space, connects directly to Bay Street.

== History ==
Plans for International Plaza first began in 1986, begun by real estate developer Dick Corbett first through International Plaza Ltd, and later Concorde Cos., partnering with Taubman Cos. The mall is built on 150 acres of land southeast of Tampa International Airport, part of which was originally an 18-hole Hall of Fame golf course. In 1998, Lord & Taylor and Nordstrom were publicly announced as anchors followed by Neiman Marcus shortly thereafter. Dillard's was announced as the fourth and final anchor in late 1998. A million square-foot office plaza was proposed that same year. Sordoni Skanska, the US subsidiary of Skanska, was awarded the contract to construct the mall in 1999.

In early 2001, it was announced that the mall had signed its first 100 tenants, with 65 of them being new to the Tampa area. An 11,000 square-foot (1,022 m^{2}) Cheesecake Factory was announced in June 2001. The mall opened to little fanfare on September 14, 2001, due to the September 11 attacks only 3 days prior, however the mall began to succeed despite this. The mall's Lord & Taylor closed in July 2004, with plans already announced to replace it with a Robb & Stucky furniture store which opened in February 2005. The Renaissance Hotel, attached to Bay Street, opened in August 2004.

Robb & Stucky closed due to bankruptcy in 2011, with upscale fitness gym LifeTime Athletic taking over the store in 2014. Fashion retailer H&M opened at the mall on November 10, 2011.

On October 11, 2024, Dick's House of Sport, an experiential concept by Dick's Sporting Goods, opened replacing the Life Time Fitness which closed on June 15.

In November 2025, Taubman Realty Group and its assets, including International Plaza and Bay Street, was acquired by the Indianapolis-based Simon Property Group.

Shortly afterwards, in February 2026, Simon had announced a renovation for International Plaza and Bay Street as well as two other centers as part of a $250 million investment. The project includes an additional 50,000 square feet (4,250 m^{2}) of open air shopping alongside a reimagined Bay Street.

== See also ==
- WestShore Plaza, a mall located one mile away down Westshore Boulevard
- Hyde Park Village, open-air shopping district in Hyde Park
