= John F. Kennedy Boulevard (Tampa, Florida) =

Major street in Tampa, Florida, U.S.

- Length: 5.3 mi (8.5 km)
- West end: Memorial Highway in Tampa, Florida
- East end: Channelside Drive in Tampa, Florida

John F. Kennedy Boulevard (better known as Kennedy Boulevard), is a major east-west corridor in Tampa, Florida. The downtown portion of the roadway was originally known as Lafayette Street, and as Grand Central Avenue west of the downtown area in the City of Tampa during the 19th century and early-to-mid-20th century. West of the city limits at Howard Avenue, it was known as Memorial Highway. At the time, it was mainly a two-lane thoroughfare. It carries the State Road 60 designation through its entire route.

Some places of interest that can be accessed from this route include WestShore Plaza, International Plaza and Bay Street, Tampa International Airport via the Veterans Expressway, the University of Tampa, Downtown Tampa, and the Port of Tampa. Kennedy Boulevard represents the northern boundary of South Tampa. The route runs from today's Memorial Highway to Channelside Drive.

== History ==
Grand Central Avenue, as the street was originally named, was the main artery for heavy westbound traffic emptying from downtown Tampa and points eastward during rush hour through the first half of the 20th century. The street was renamed in 1964 in honor of President John F. Kennedy following his assassination in late 1963, only a few days after he had visited the city using that very street.

When Interstate 4 was built in the mid-1960s, traffic on Kennedy Boulevard shrank to less than 50 percent of its previous activity, and many businesses that depended on the high traffic count closed or relocated. As the population of Tampa and both residential and commercial development have significantly increased, Kennedy Boulevard has been similarly developed, including an expansion to 4 to 6 lanes through the business district.

Today, Kennedy Boulevard serves as a vital link to and from Downtown Tampa and serves as an alternate to I-275 during rush hour.

== Connections to President Kennedy ==
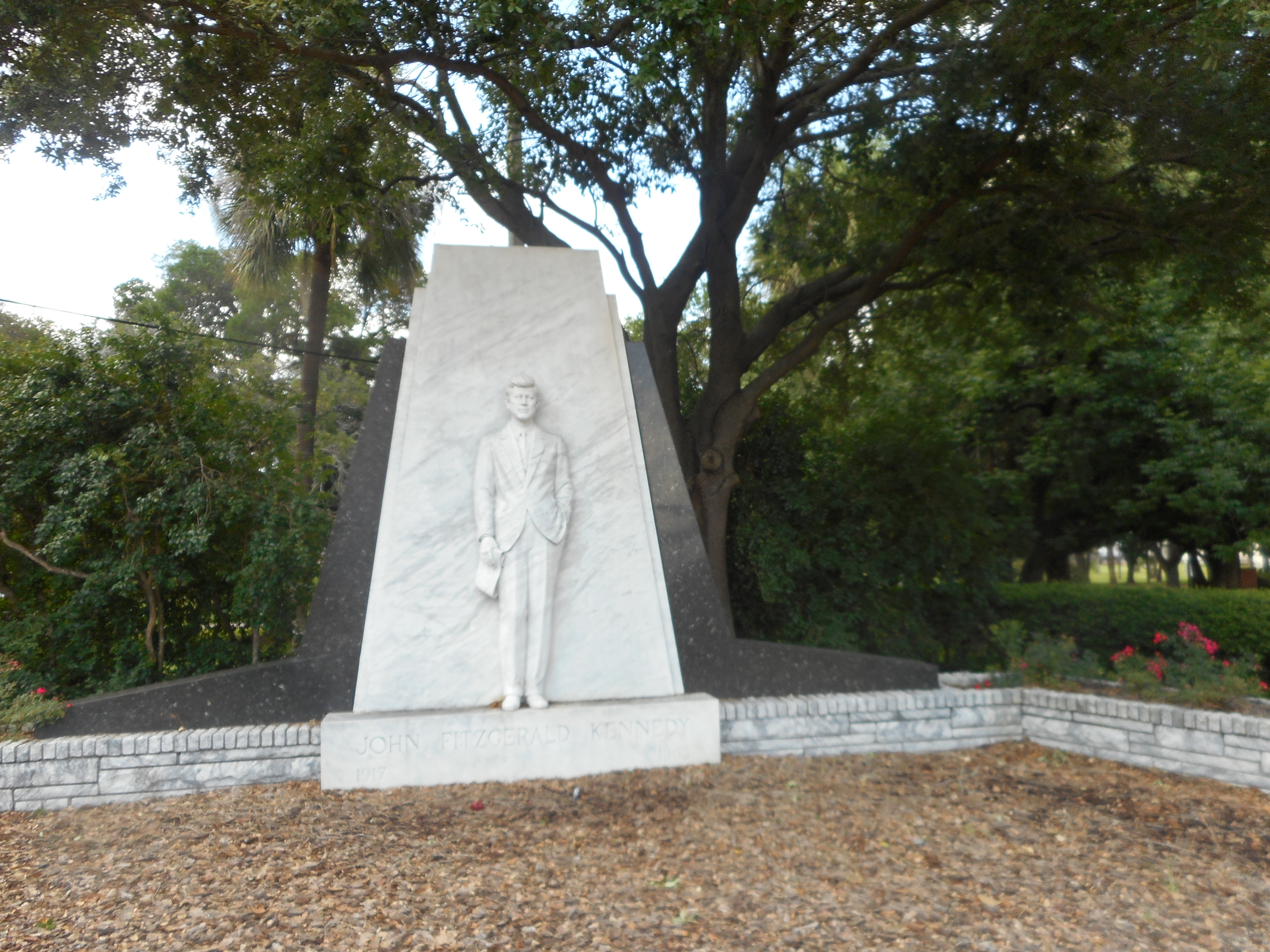
Statue of JFK at Plant Park on the University of Tampa campus at Hyde Park Street, along the boulevard

President John F. Kennedy visited Tampa on November 18, 1963, and his motorcade traveled about five miles down Grand Central Avenue through the center of the business district. He would be assassinated in Dallas four days later on November 22. The following year, Grand Central Avenue was renamed in Kennedy's honor by the unanimous vote of Tampa City Council. According to Kennedy Library records, Kennedy's public exposure in Tampa was only the second-longest during his entire presidency, after that of his visit earlier that year to Berlin, Germany.

The studio for television station WTVT is located on Kennedy Blvd. near MacDill Avenue and Henderson Boulevard. On the day of President Kennedy's visit to Tampa, a live television camera perched atop the station's front portico captured the Presidential motorcade as it whizzed eastward on then Grand Central Avenue on its way through downtown Tampa and on to Tampa's Ft. Homer W. Hesterly Armory. At the time, live remotes from multiple locations were a rarity for local stations and so that part of the motorcade was all of his visit that many Tampa Bay area residents could witness by television.

About the same time that Grand Central Avenue was renamed, a group of Tampa community activists headed by Robert Florio (the local Democratic Party Chairman) pooled resources to commission a life-sized statue of the slain President by a prominent Italian artist. The piece was shipped to the United States in mid-1964 and erected at a site at Plant Park on the University of Tampa campus at Hyde Park Avenue, where the statue faces Kennedy Boulevard.

== See also ==
- List of memorials to John F. Kennedy
