= L.D. Hutchinson House =

Historic house in Arkansas, United States

- L. D. Hutchinson House
- U.S. National Register of Historic Places
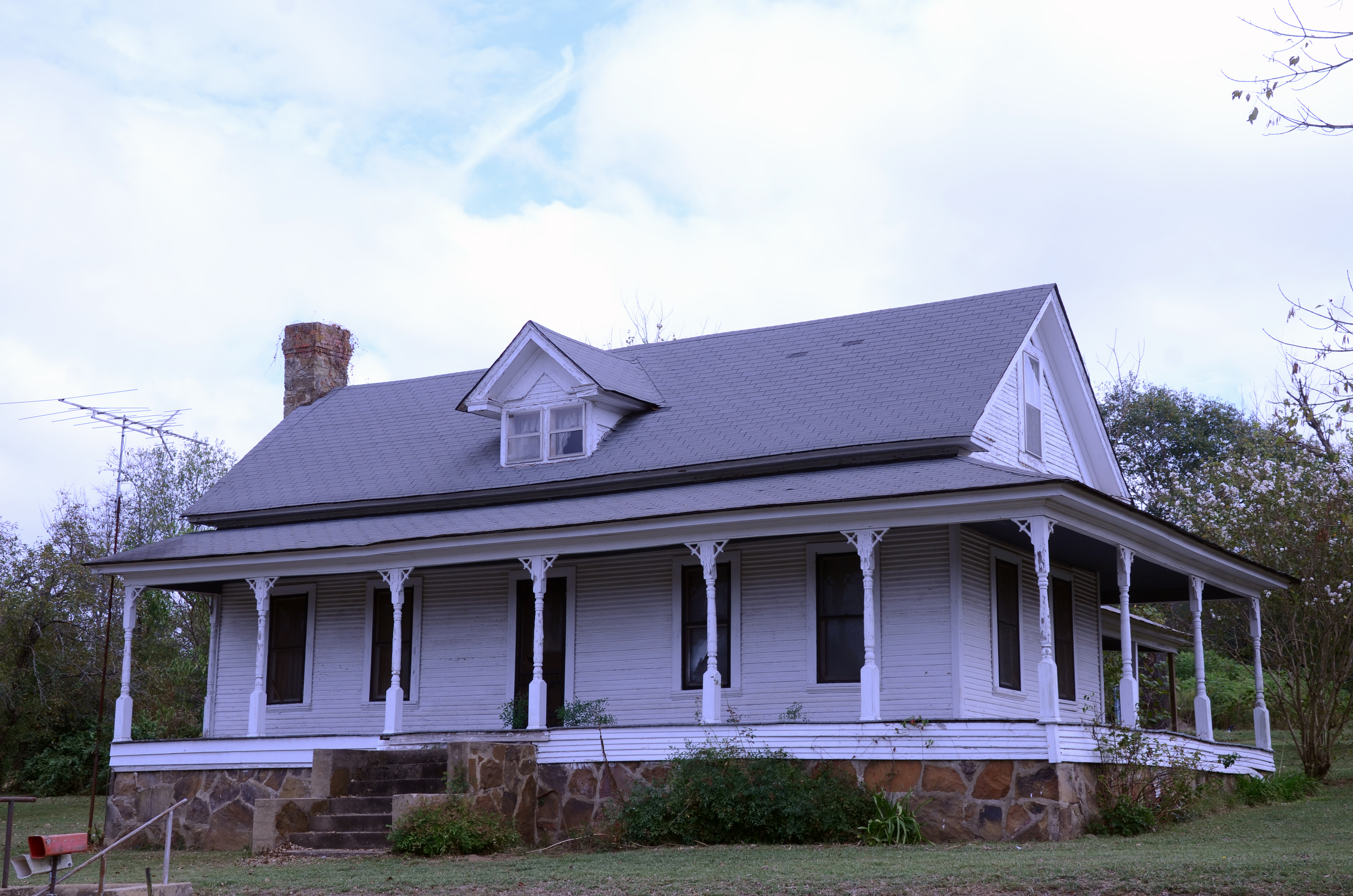

- Location within Arkansas Location within the United States
- Nearest city: Floyd, Arkansas
- Coordinates: 35°11′47″N 91°58′2″W
- Area: less than one acre
- Built: 1914
- Architectural style: Vernacular T-shaped
- MPS: White County MPS
- NRHP reference No.: 91001325
- Added to NRHP: July 22, 1992

The L.D. Hutchinson House is a historic house on the east side of Arkansas Highway 31 in the small community of Floyd, Arkansas, a short way north of its junction with Arkansas Highway 305. The house is a 1 1/2 story wood-frame structure, with a side gable roof and novelty siding. A single-story shed-roof porch extends across the west-facing front, supported by turned posts with decorative wooden bracket at the top. A single gabled dormer projects from the center of the roof, and an ell extends to the rear of the house, giving it a T shape. The house was built in 1914 by L.D. Hutchinson, a local farmer who also operated the local general store and post office.

The house was listed on the National Register of Historic Places in 1992.

== See also ==
- National Register of Historic Places listings in White County, Arkansas
