= Howard Avenue (Tampa) =

Street in Tampa, Florida

Howard Avenue is a north-south road in the West Tampa (North Howard) and South Tampa (South Howard) sections of Tampa, Florida. South Howard is home to the SoHo (Tampa) (South Howard) entertainment district and several popular restaurants and bars. North Howard is home to several historic buildings.

Howard Avenue was named in honor of Howard P. Macfarlane, the son of developer Hugh C. Macfarlane, who developed the area, and his 2nd wife Frances Pettingill.

== History ==
It was part of a street route (closed in 1946). Delgado's Department Store owned by Emilia Salcines was located where Salcines Park is now located. Many historic buildings remain on Howard Avenue including the Alessi Bakery building used from the 1940s until the 1960s. Olympia Bakery remains on Howard. Patrone's Bakery was located on North Howard. The Sicilian Club and its Cazin theater were located at 2001 North Howard. Howard was also home to a cigar factory.

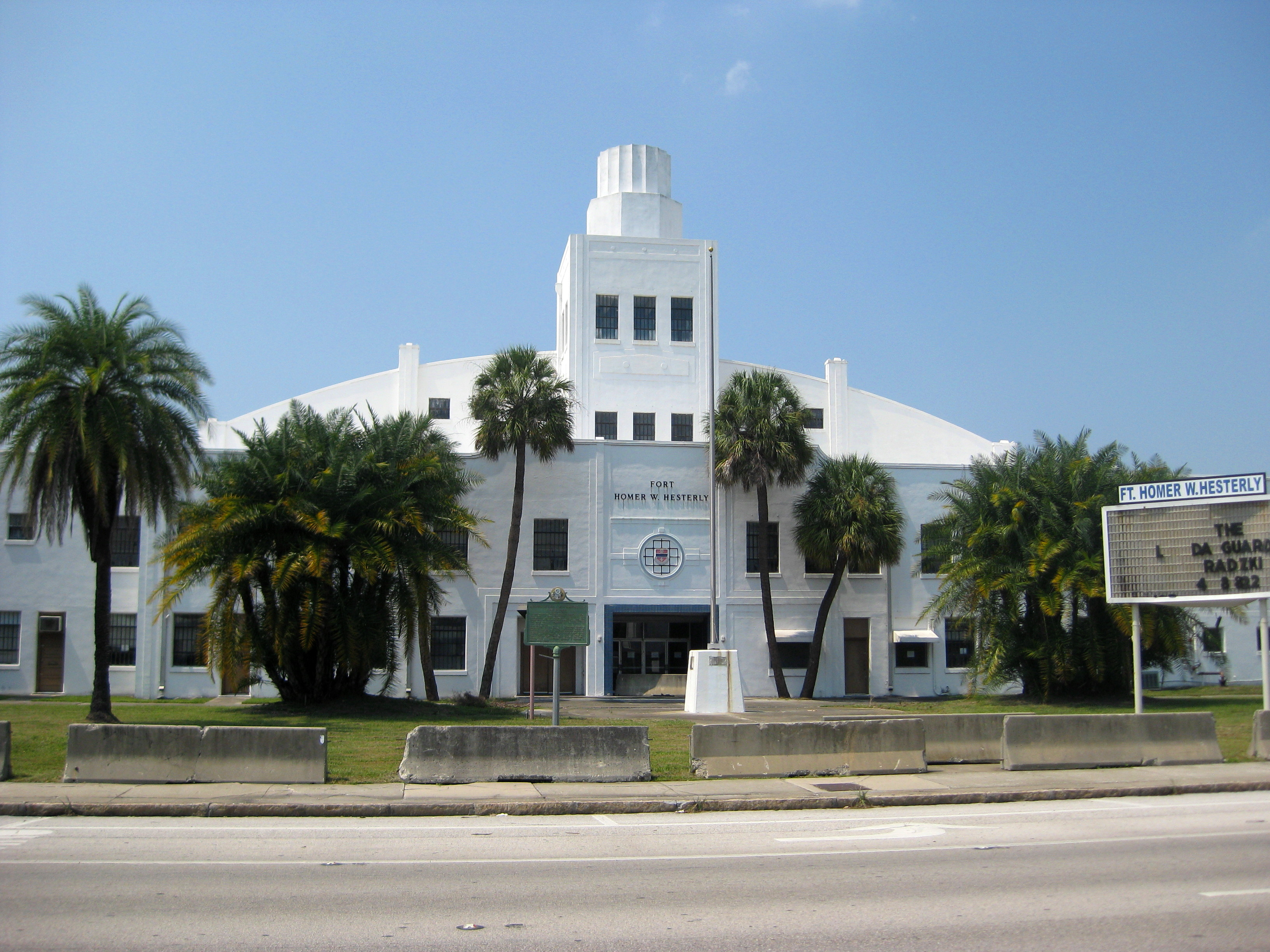
Fort Homer W. Hesterly building

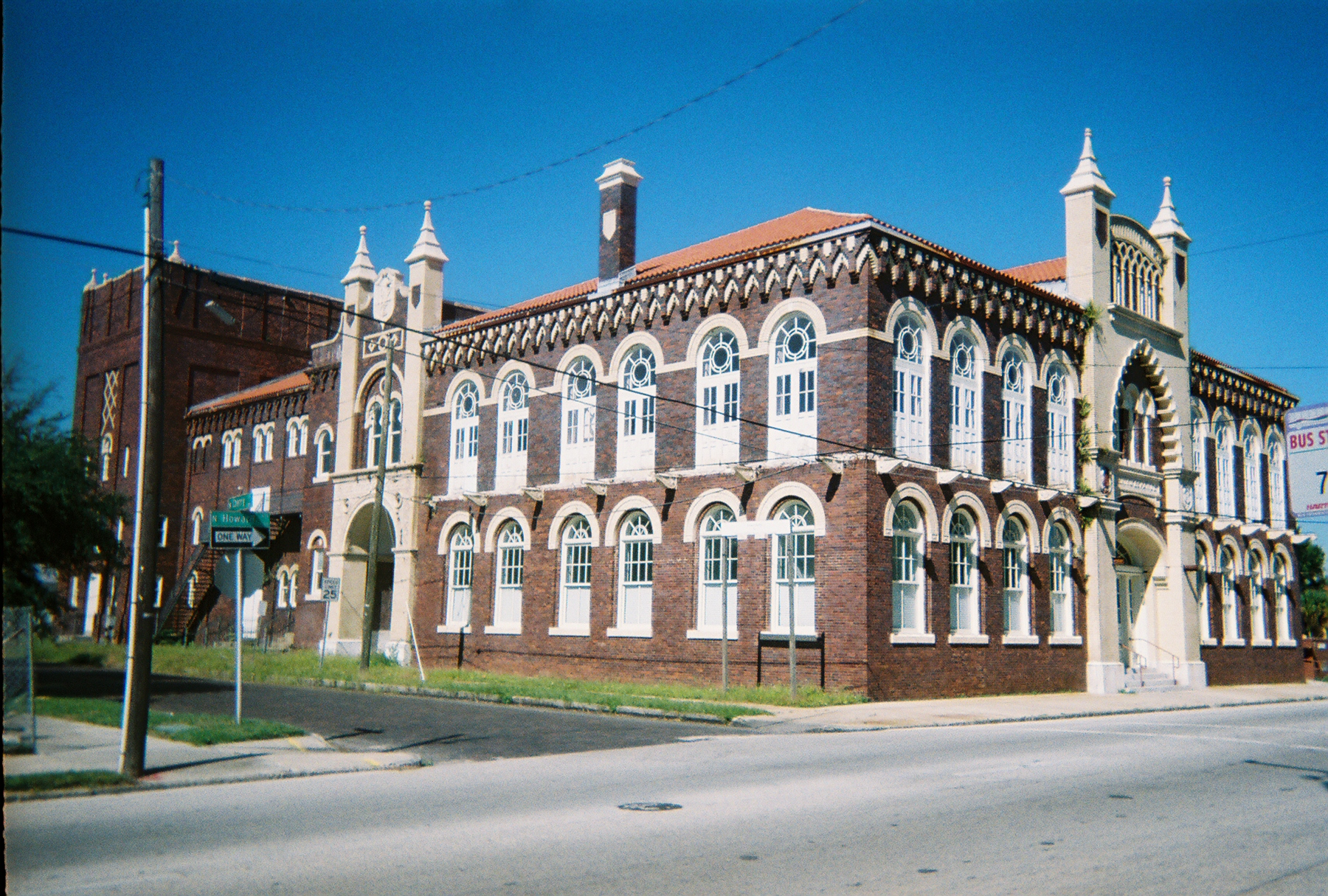
El Centro Español of West Tampa

The historic Fort Homer W. Hesterly building is located at 522 North Howard Avenue. The Bank of West Tampa was located at 1611 North Howard Avenue, in a building later used for the 4th of July Cafe. The West Tampa Centro Español club was located at 2306 North Howard Avenue between Cherry St. and Palmetto. The West Tampa Library was a Carnegie Library. Rey Park at Howard Avenue and Cherry Street is named for Peregrino Rey, a Spanish immigrant cigar factory worker became a cigar factory, West Tampa city councilman, and mayor of West Tampa in 1909. The Trinity CME Church at Howard Avenue and Palmetto was the home to the Cuban Lodge. Another historic building at Howard Avenue and Beech Street dates to 1925 and was the Cuesta Apartments and later the "El Borden" boarding house and the Golden Nugget bar in the 1960s before being vacated. It was restored as a gift shop. A historic home is located at the southwest corner of Howard Avenue and St. Conrad Street and the Morgan Cigar Factory building constructed in 1907 at Howard Avenue and St. Louis Street is commemorated with a plaque.
