= Hyde Park Historic Districts =

Historic districts in Florida, United States

- U.S. National Register of Historic Places
- U.S. Historic district
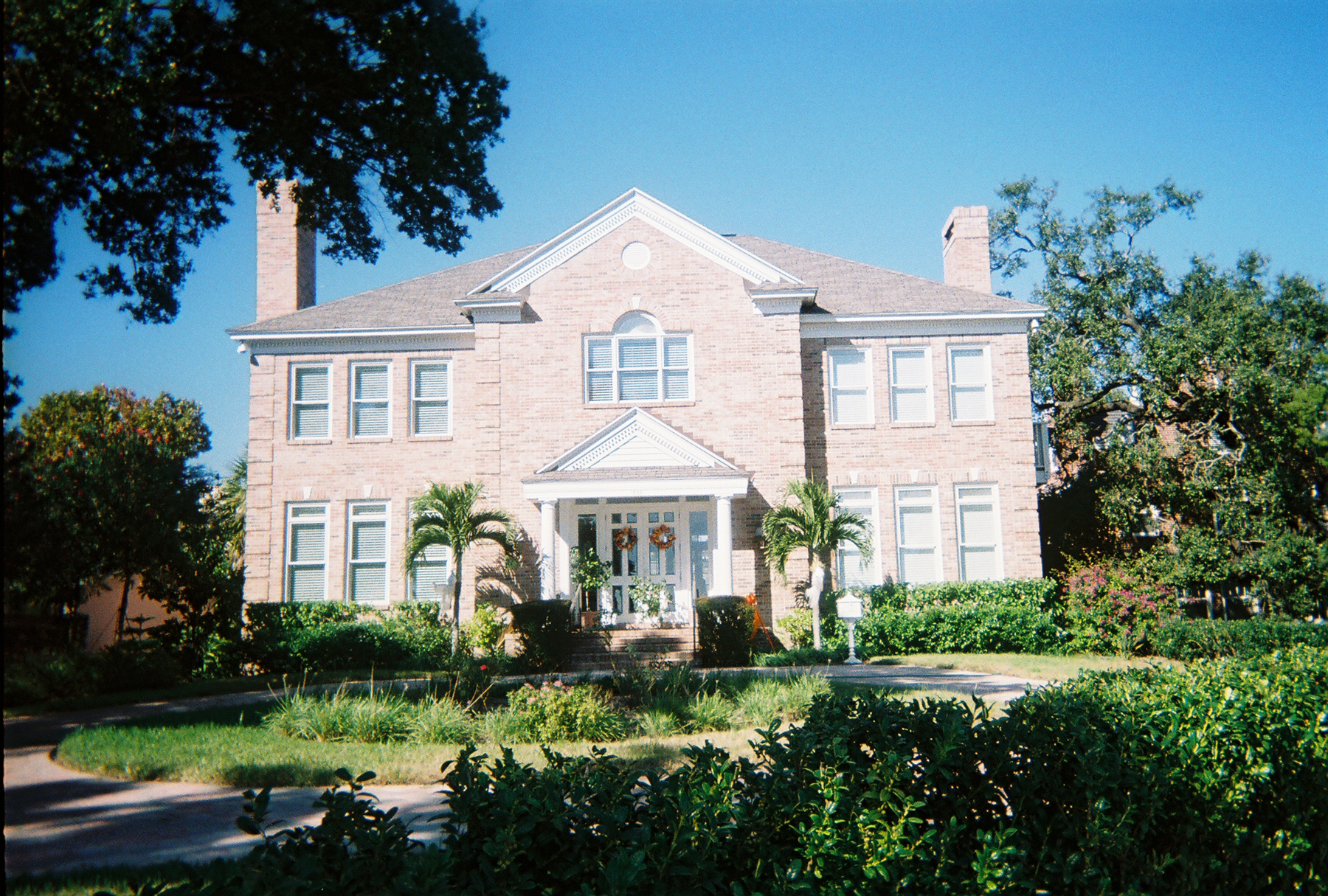
- House in district

- Location within Florida Location within the United States
- Location: Roughly bounded by Hillsborough River and Bay, Rome Ave., and Swann Ave., Tampa, Florida
- Coordinates: 27°56′11″N 82°28′23″W
- Area: 560 acres (2 km^{2})
- NRHP reference No.: 85000454
- Added to NRHP: March 4, 1985

The Hyde Park Historic Districts are U.S. Historic Districts (designated as such on March 4, 1985) located in Tampa, Florida. They are bounded by the Hillsborough River, Hillsborough Bay, Howard Avenue, and Kennedy Boulevard. They contain 1,264 buildings, including the Hutchinson House and the Anderson-Frank House.
