= Farley-Hutchinson-Kimball House =

Historic house in Massachusetts, United States

- U.S. National Register of Historic Places
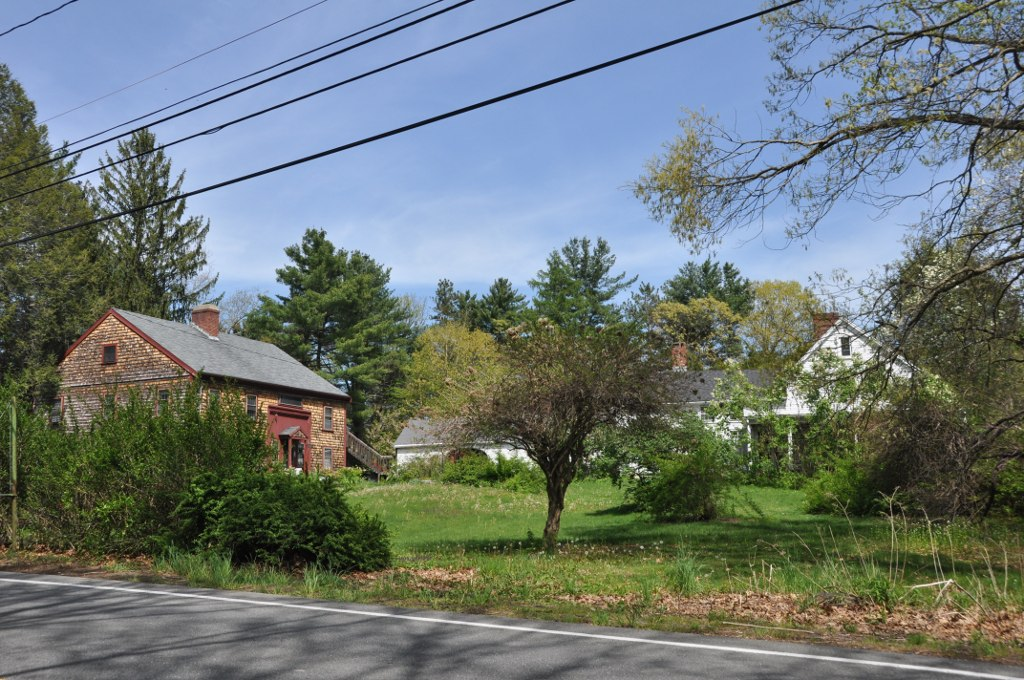

- Location within Massachusetts Location within the United States
- Location: 461A, 463 North Street, Bedford, Massachusetts
- Coordinates: 42°31′26″N 71°17′7″W
- Built: 1732
- NRHP reference No.: 12000151
- Added to NRHP: March 27, 2012

The Farley-Hutchinson-Kimball House is a historic house and barn at 461A and 463 North Road in Bedford, Massachusetts. The property consists of a house whose oldest portions date to c. 1732, and an attached barn from the late 19th century that has been converted to residential use. The buildings were listed on the National Register of Historic Places in 2012.

The main block of the house, a 2 1/2-story five-bay timber-frame structure, was probably built c. 1732 by Christopher Page, for his daughter Joanna and son-in-law Benjamin Farley. It was on property Page subdivided to make the gift and probably already had a house on it. The newer building is surmised to have been built between 1728 and 1732. The Farleys did not stay long in the house, moving to Dunstable, Massachusetts (a part that is now Hollis, New Hampshire) in 1733, selling their farmstead to Benjamin Hutchinson. In the 19th century it passed through several hands, until it was purchased in 1911 by Charles and Edith Kimball, who established a poultry farm on the premises. In 1913 the Kimballs embarked on a major renovation and expansion project, giving the house its Colonial Revival character.

From about 1920 into the 1930s the Kimballs also made and sold candy on the premises, adapting the 19th century barn for those purposes. In 1946 the Kimballs converted to barn to two residential apartments. The only major later addition to the property was a c. 1979 kitchen addition to the house, which was executed in a historically sensitive way.

== See also ==
- National Register of Historic Places listings in Middlesex County, Massachusetts
