= Hutchinson House (Alstead, New Hampshire) =

Historic house in New Hampshire, United States

- U.S. National Register of Historic Places
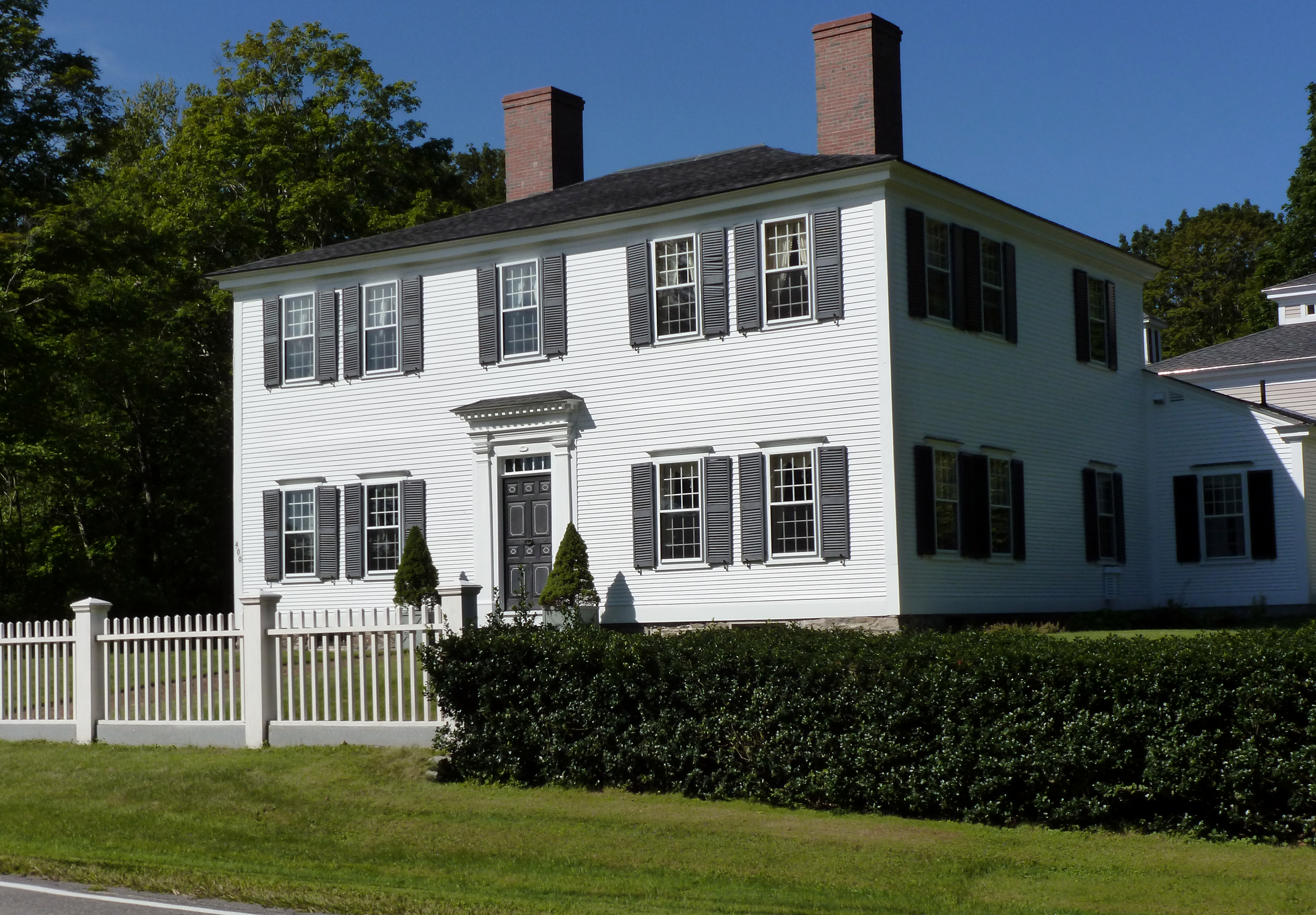

- Location within New Hampshire Location within the United States
- Location: 400 Alstead Center Rd., Alstead, New Hampshire
- Coordinates: 43°7′26″N 72°19′39″W
- Built: 1805
- Architectural style: Georgian
- NRHP reference No.: 14001240
- Added to NRHP: February 2, 2015

The Hutchinson House is a historic house at 400 Alstead Center Road in Alstead, New Hampshire, United States. Built in 1805–09, it is one of a small number of Georgian houses in southwestern New Hampshire. It was added to the National Register of Historic Places in February 2015.

== Description and history ==
It is one of the few full Georgian-plan houses in western New Hampshire, and is similar to the Pierce Mansion in Hillsborough and the Faxon House in Washington, New Hampshire. It was built over the period 1805–1809, with construction probably delayed by the economic hardships during the second Jefferson administration. The interior of the house displays the changes in taste that were occurring during the early nineteenth century, and may have been occasioned by the extended period of construction. The interior of the south side of the house is in the Georgian mode with paneled fireplace walls and doors with the typical Georgian panel arrangement. On the north side the Federal style predominates with Federal-style door panel arrangement (small panels at the top of the door rather than in the middle). The Federal style is further reflected in the stenciled walls in both northern chambers. These stencils are attributed to Moses Eaton Jr. Another unusual feature is the presence of two kitchens, each with cooking fireplaces and intact bake ovens.

In 1813 the house was purchased by merchant Major Samuel Hutchinson, the adopted son of General Amos Shepard, a prominent figure in the commercial, political and military affairs of the period. The house remained in the Hutchinson family until the 1850s, then passed through several owners until 1892 when it was purchased by the family of Henry F. Hitch of South Orange, New Jersey, as a retirement home and summer escape from the uncomfortable conditions of the New York City area. Mrs. Hitch was a Delano descendant, and second cousin to Sara Delano Roosevelt, mother of President Franklin D. Roosevelt. The house remained in the Hitch family until the 1960s. During the first half of the twentieth century the Hutchinson house was one of a number of early homes in Alstead Center that were used as summer places for affluent families from New York and New Jersey.

== See also ==
- National Register of Historic Places in Cheshire County, New Hampshire
