= West Tampa =

- District
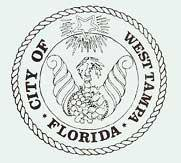
- Seal

- Location within the state of Florida
- Coordinates: 27°57′11″N 82°29′22″W
- Country: United States
- State: Florida
- County: Hillsborough
- City: Tampa
- Established: 1895
- Time zone: UTC-5 (Eastern (EST))
  - Summer (DST): UTC-4 (EDT)
- Area code: 813

West Tampa is one of the oldest neighborhoods within the city limits of Tampa, Florida, United States. It was an independently incorporated city from 1895 until 1925, when it was annexed by Tampa.

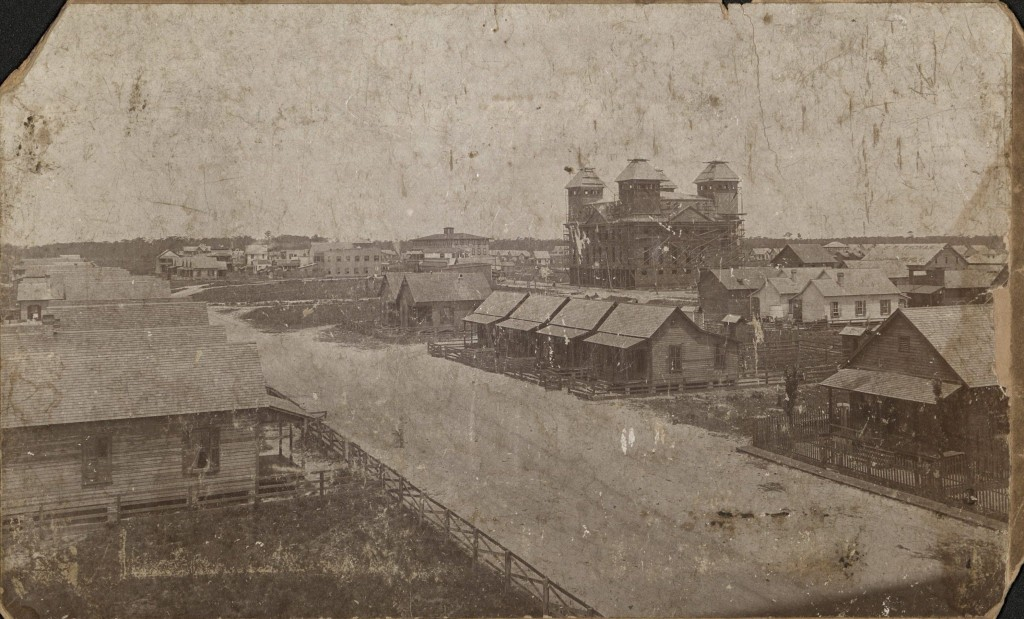
One of two oldest known photos of West Tampa, circa. 1895

West Tampa is located west of the Hillsborough River approximately 1 mile from downtown. As of the 2000 census, the district had a population of 22,008. It has consistently been home to one of the highest concentration of Latinos in the city since its founding in 1892.

== History ==
=== Establishment and early history ===
West Tampa was founded in 1892 by Scottish immigrant and local attorney Hugh Macfarlane, who bought 200 acres of forested land with the intention of starting a new development by luring some of the cigar factories and cigar workers from Ybor City, a very successful new immigrant community on the northeast side of Tampa.

West Tampa's initial growth was stunted by transportation issues. The first cigar factory built in the area was forced to close temporarily because workers refused to ride a ferry across the Hillsborough River to the "wilds" of West Tampa.

Macfarlane had built a bridge and connected West Tampa to Tampa's extensive streetcar line by 1894, spurring a period of tremendous growth. Many of these new residents had not come over from Ybor City; most were Cuban immigrants who settled in West Tampa soon after arriving in the United States. Accordingly, the community was almost exclusivity Cuban during the first several years of its existence. A gradual influx of Italians and Spaniards, mainly from Ybor City, gradually made the cultural mix of the two communities more similar over time.

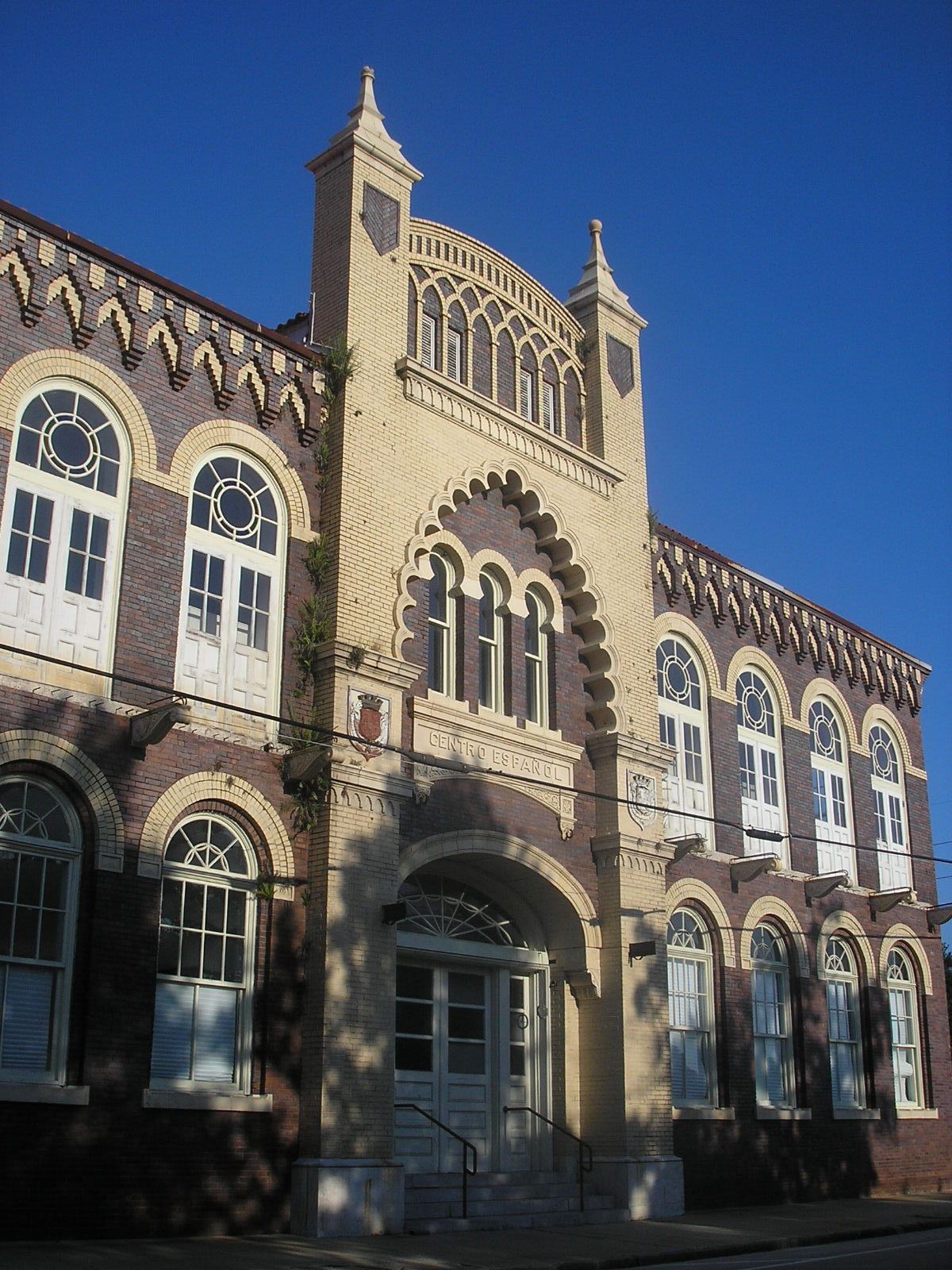
Former West Tampa branch of the Centro Español club, now houses the Hillsborough Education Foundation

West Tampa was incorporated as a city on May 18, 1895, with a population of 2,335, making it the 2nd largest Hispanic community in the state. By 1900, it had more inhabitants than Florida's capital city of Tallahassee and was the second largest city in Hillsborough County, behind only Tampa. The neighboring communities combined to produce more hand-rolled cigars than any other locale in the world during the early 20th century, earning Tampa the nickname "Cigar City".

The first public library in Hillsborough County, the West Tampa Free Public Library, opened on Howard Avenue in 1914. Construction of the Neo-classical revivalist style brick building was funded with a $17,500 grant from Andrew Carnegie. The West Tampa Library was restored and expanded in 2004 and is still in use.

=== West Tampa Police Department ===
During its incorporated life, West Tampa operated the West Tampa Police Department. It was absorbed by the Tampa Police Department in 1925. One officer was killed in its short history. On July 18, 1920, Patrolman Juan Nales and another officer were walking a man they arrested to jail when the suspect attacked. The suspect gained control of Nales's gun and fatally shot him. The suspect was captured after fleeing and subsequently convicted of murder.

=== Annexation ===
As the years progressed, the connections between West Tampa and Ybor City grew stronger. Most "Latins" (as Tampa's mix of Spanish, Cuban, and Italian cultures is locally known) had family and friends in both of the neighboring towns. Many people lived in one community and worked in the other. Ybor City's social clubs regularly held large picnics, baseball games, and other events at West Tampa's spacious MacFarlane Park. Some of the clubs built elaborate branch locations for their West Tampa members, further uniting the two increasingly homogeneous districts.

The boundaries between West Tampa and "Anglo Tampa" also blurred as the larger city grew west and south until its suburbs bumped against the edges of West Tampa. The process concluded in 1925, when West Tampa was formally annexed by the city of Tampa.

=== Neighborhood ===
As Ybor City faded and emptied out after World War II, many of its residents moved to West Tampa, making it the largest predominantly Latin neighborhood in town. While the same factors that destroyed Ybor City's cigar industry also affected West Tampa, the latter community had enough economic variety to survive when the cigar factories either became totally mechanized or shut down altogether.

In the late 1950s and early 1960s, West Tampa received another large influx of Cuban immigrants as they fled Castro's revolution. With very few jobs remaining in the cigar industry by that era, new arrivals found work in various other sectors.

As of 2017, the neighborhood has many Colombian cuisine and small Cuban and Puerto Rican eateries and ethnic markets, mostly along main roads such as Columbus Drive, Armenia Avenue, Howard Avenue, Main Street, and Tampa Bay Boulevard. Most of the large brick cigar factory buildings still stand, but none are still used for their original purpose. Some have been renovated and remodeled for office space and other uses, while others have been vacant for years. A few cigars are still rolled in smaller shops and storefronts.

While poverty and urban decay have been problematic issues in West Tampa since the 1970s, the district has garnered renewed interest and appreciation for its history and culture. The area saw increasing levels of investment, restoration, and new construction beginning in the 2000s. Redevelopment stalled during the Great Recession, but resumed several years later with several projects including new apartments, renovation and overhaul of Julian Lane Waterfront Park, and demolition of several city blocks of older public housing to be replaced with new townhome construction.

== Description ==
The historical boundaries of West Tampa are the Hillsborough River and Rome Avenue to the east, Dr. Martin Luther King Jr. Blvd (formerly Buffalo Ave.) to the north, Kennedy Blvd. (formerly Grand Central Ave.) to the south, and Dale Mabry Highway to the west. The West Tampa Historic District encompasses much of this area, and Interstate 275, built in the 1960s, runs through the approximate center of the neighborhood. The land area of the district is about 10 square miles (about 26 km^{2}).

== Areas within West Tampa ==
Distinct areas within the West Tampa district are Bowman Heights, Marina Club, Northeast Macfarlane, and Old West Tampa.
