= Hutchinson House (Tampa, Florida) =

Historic house in Florida, United States

- U.S. National Register of Historic Places
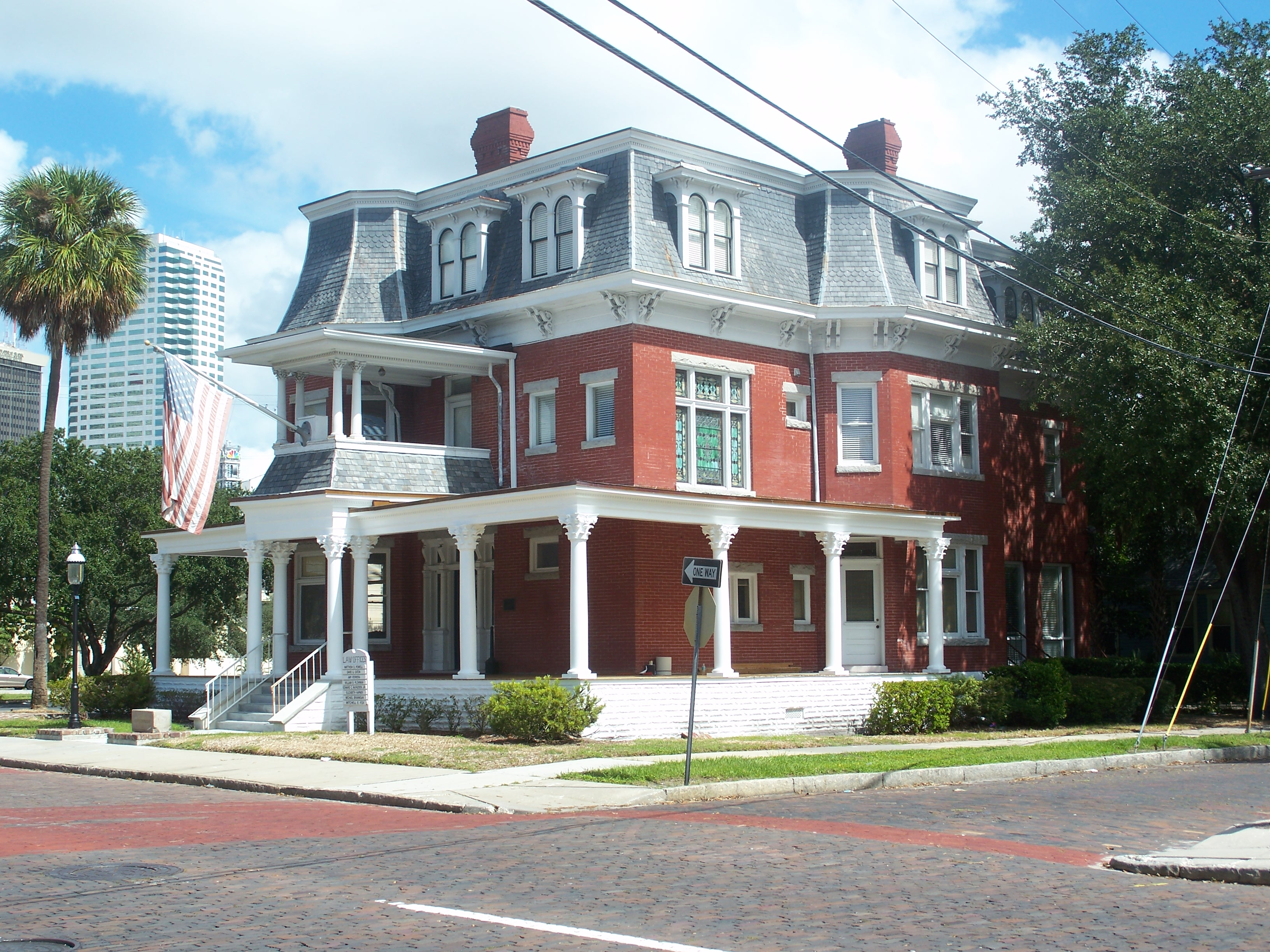

- Location within Florida Location within the United States
- Location: 304 Plant Ave., Tampa, Florida United States
- Coordinates: 27°56′28″N 82°27′46″W
- Area: less than one acre
- Built: 1908
- Architectural style: Second Empire
- NRHP reference No.: 77000404
- Added to NRHP: November 1, 1977

The Hutchinson House is a historic home completed in 1908 in Tampa, Florida, United States. It is a three-story brick building in the Second Empire architecture. The building includes a high mansard roof and large porch with tall Corinthian columns.

It was built by Currie J. Hutchinson, a local merchant, and is one of the few structures of its style in Florida. It was added to the U.S. National Register of Historic Places on November 1, 1977, and is located at 304 Plant Avenue.

== History ==
The Hutchinson House was built by Mr. Currie Hutchinson. Construction began in 1906 and the building was finished in 1908. Most of the building materials were shipped from Hutchinson's home state of Ohio. The masonry technique was rather unusual and allowed for a very tight mortar line in between the red bricks.

The exterior walls are approximately 18 inches thick of solid brick. The building even has a basement, which has remained dry for over 100 years, despite being situated less than 1/8 of a mile from the Tampa Bay. There are 5 working fireplaces, 3 on the first floor, two on the second floor and a stove in the basement. The total construction cost was reported to be approximately six thousand five hundred dollars. A small fortune back then.

The Hutchinson Mansion was occupied by the Hutchinson family while Mr. Hutchinson operated his pharmacy on Franklin Street in downtown Tampa.

It was next used as a hospital from approximately 1932 to 1946. Hutchinson House was then used as a rooming house until 1958 when it became the Pi Kappa Phi fraternity. It remained a fraternity house until 1977 the University of Tampa kicked all the fraternities off the campus and the Hutchinson house was left empty (and in very rough shape).

The University of Tampa sold the mansion to the City of Tampa. The City of Tampa sold the Hutchinson House to the Tampa Preservation Society, which commenced a major restoration of the building which continued for approximately two years.

In 1980, attorney William B. Plowman began negotiations with the Tampa Preservation Society to purchase the Hutchinson House. He purchased the building in 1981, and continued the restoration including improvements to the first, second and third floors, most notably restoring access to the third floor without interfering with the interior flow of the house. All historical aspects were strictly adhered to during all the restorations.

In 1989, Matt Powell rented space from Mr. Plowman. Matt loved the building so much that he was able to persuade Mr. Plowman to transfer the duties of the Hutchinson House to him in 1999. Matt Powell purchased the historical building and has continued to preserve, restore and maintain it.

== Architecture ==
One of the most interesting things about the Historical Hutchinson house is the architecture style. It is of the "Second Empire" style, which is reflected in the third Floor exterior walls. The third floor is contained inside the mansard roof. The mansard roof is made of slate. Each slate shingle was cut by hand, and has lasted over a century. The Hutchinson house has been through 100 years of hurricanes, heat and cold, and still remains in excellent condition.

Second Empire is an architectural style popular during the Victorian era, reaching its zenith between 1865 and 1880, and so named for the "French" elements in vogue during the era of the Second French Empire. The canonical example of Second Empire style is the Opera Garnier (formerly known as the "Paris Opera") in Paris. In the United States, the Second Empire style usually includes a steep, mansard roof; the roof being the most noteworthy link to the style's French roots. This tower element could be of equal height of the top most floor. As was done with the Hutchinson House. The mansard roof crest was often topped with an iron trim, sometimes referred to as "cresting".

The Hutchinson Mansion also prominently displays 3 separate chimneys extending 10 feet above the roof top. These chimneys service the 5 fireplaces, and stove.

In 2007, a replica of the original gas lantern was restored to the front yard. And the Hutchinson House Stone, seen above, was used as a stepping stone to make it easier to sit upon your horse.

== Landmark status ==
The Hutchinson House has been a historical landmark building since 1977, when the United States Department of the Interior decided that due to the architecture, age, and condition of the building that it should be preserved as a historical landmark.

== Additional sources and external links ==
Media related to Hutchinson House (Tampa, Florida) at Wikimedia Commons

- Hillsborough County listings at National Register of Historic Places
- Florida's Office of Cultural and Historical Programs
  - Hillsborough County listings
  - Hutchinson House
