= Tampa, Florida =

City in the United States

Tampa
- City
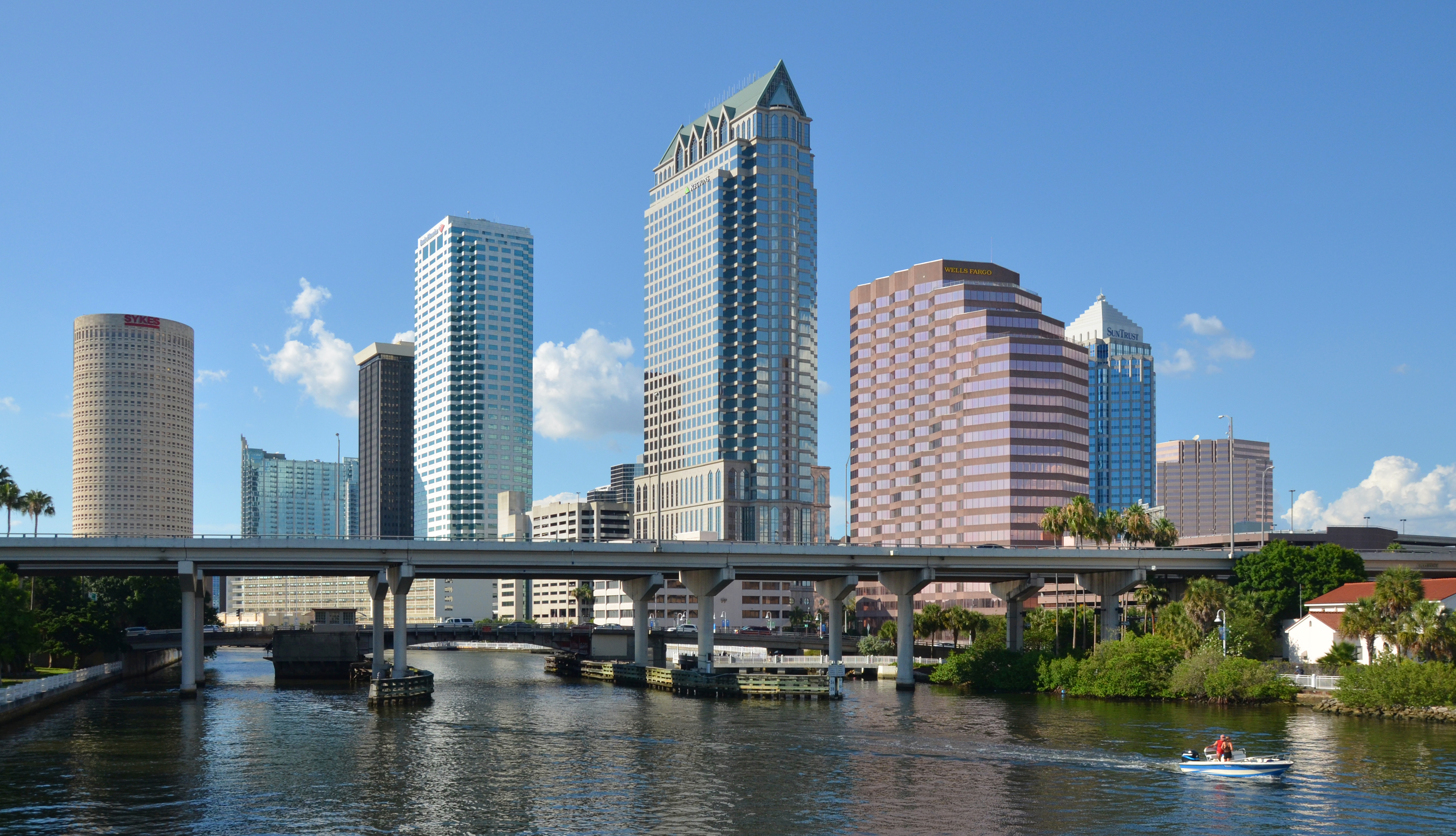
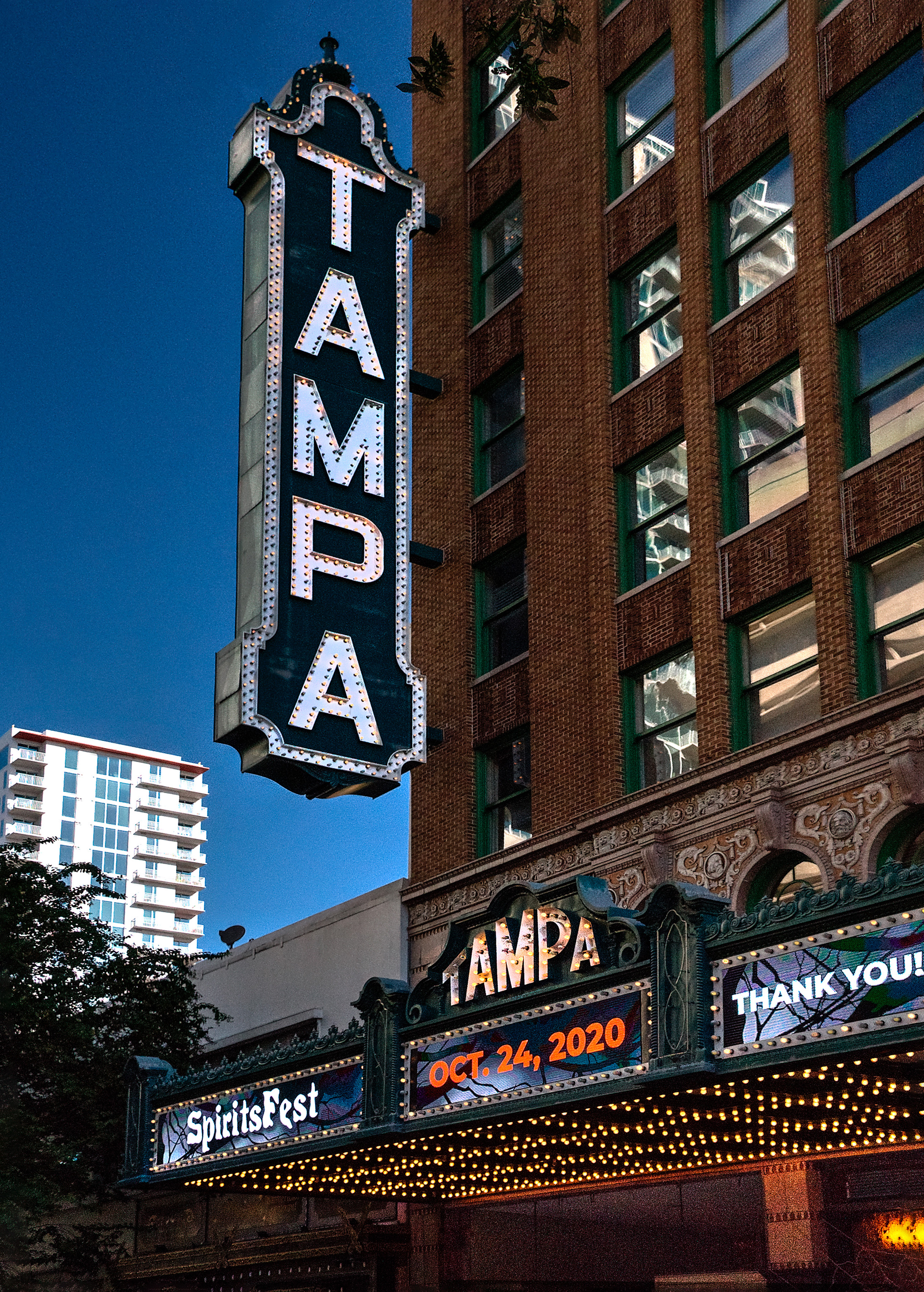
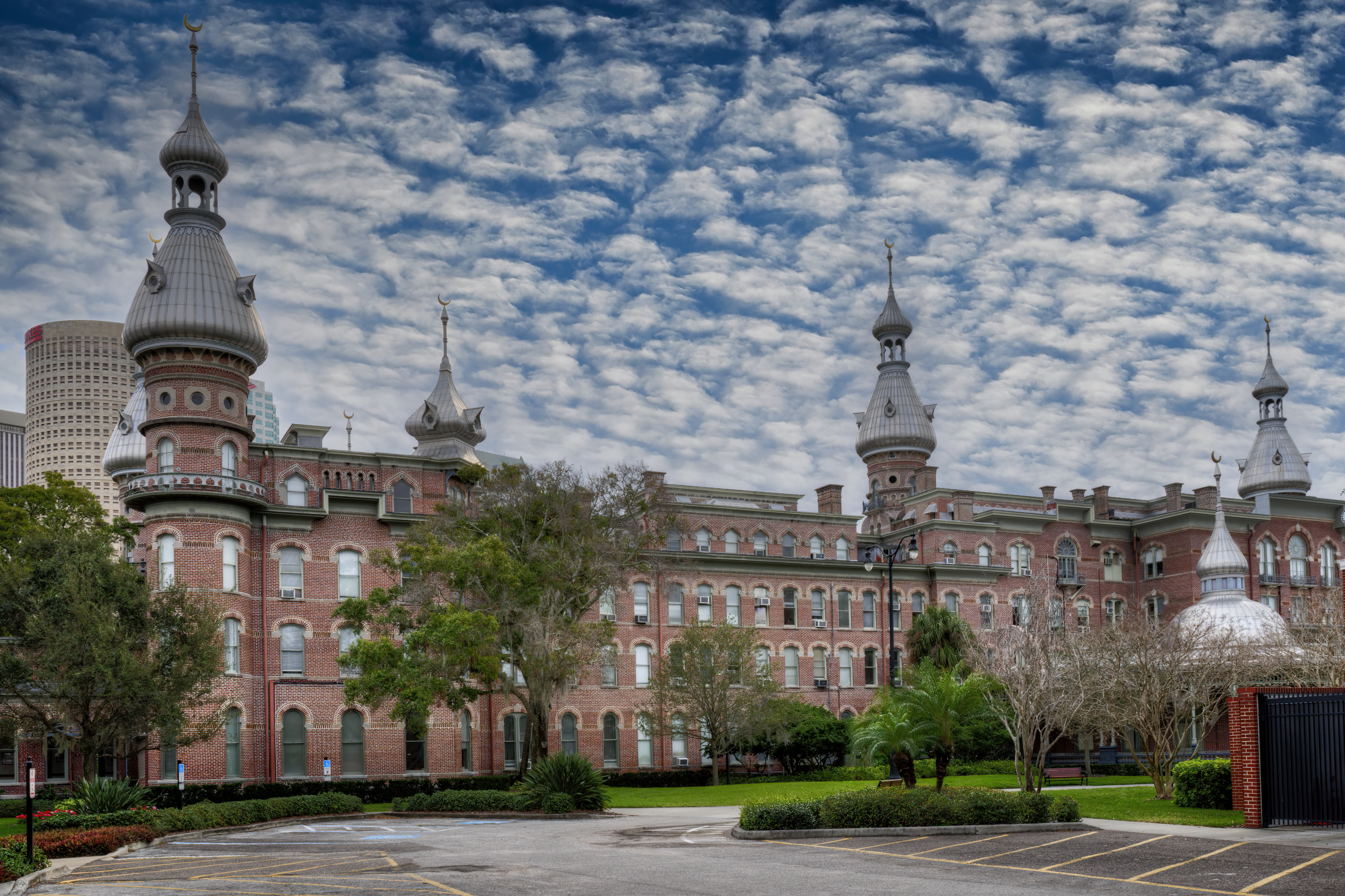
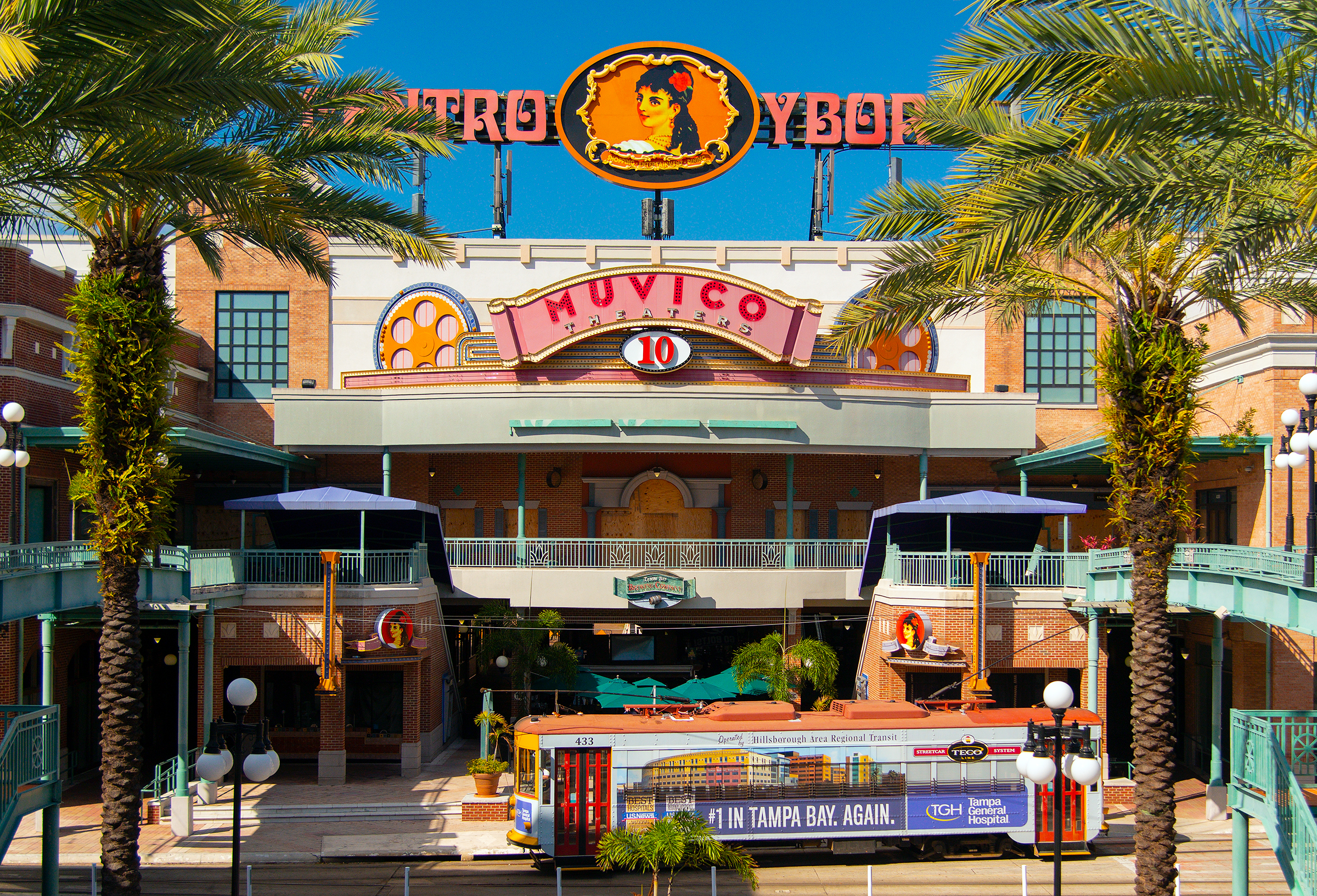
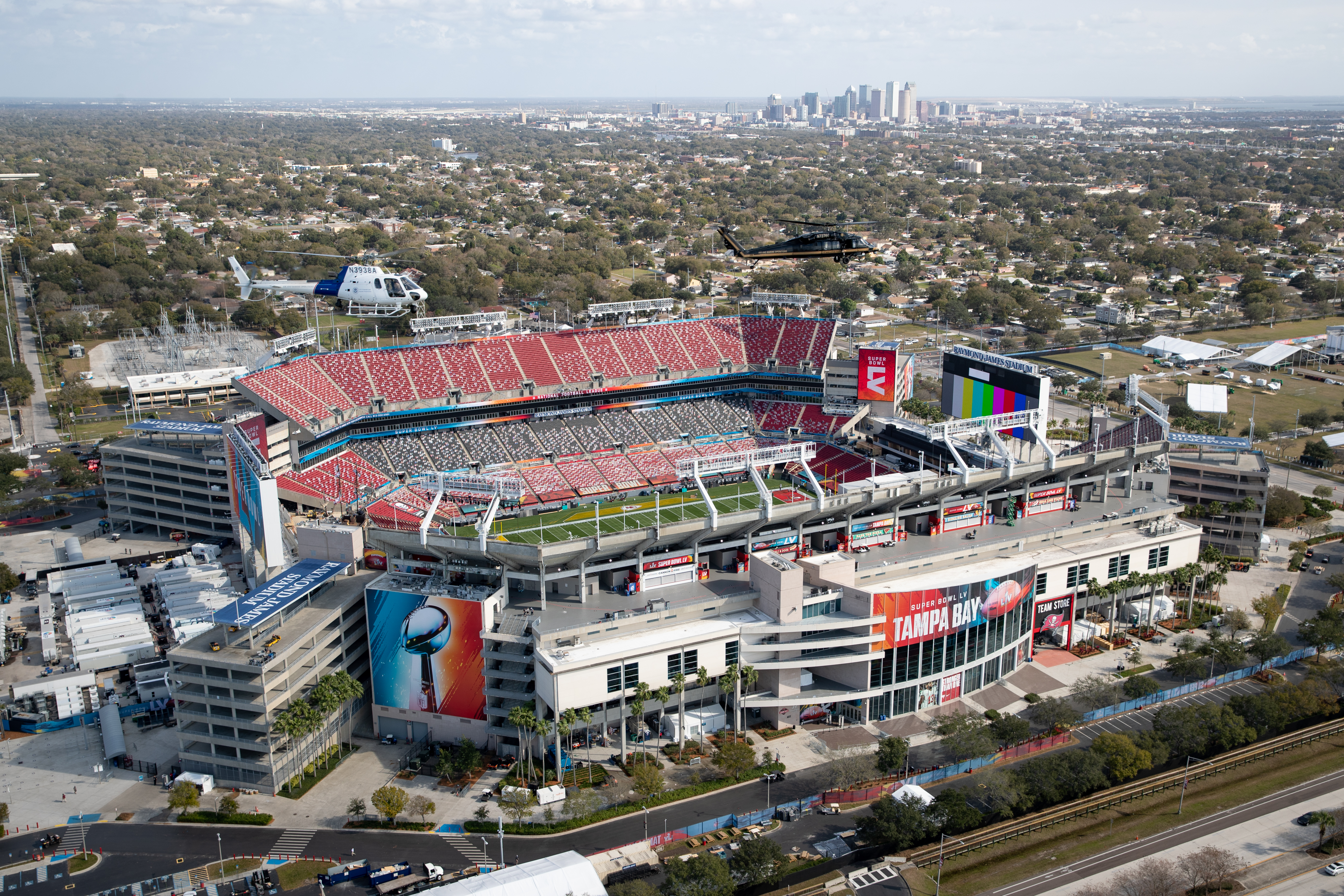
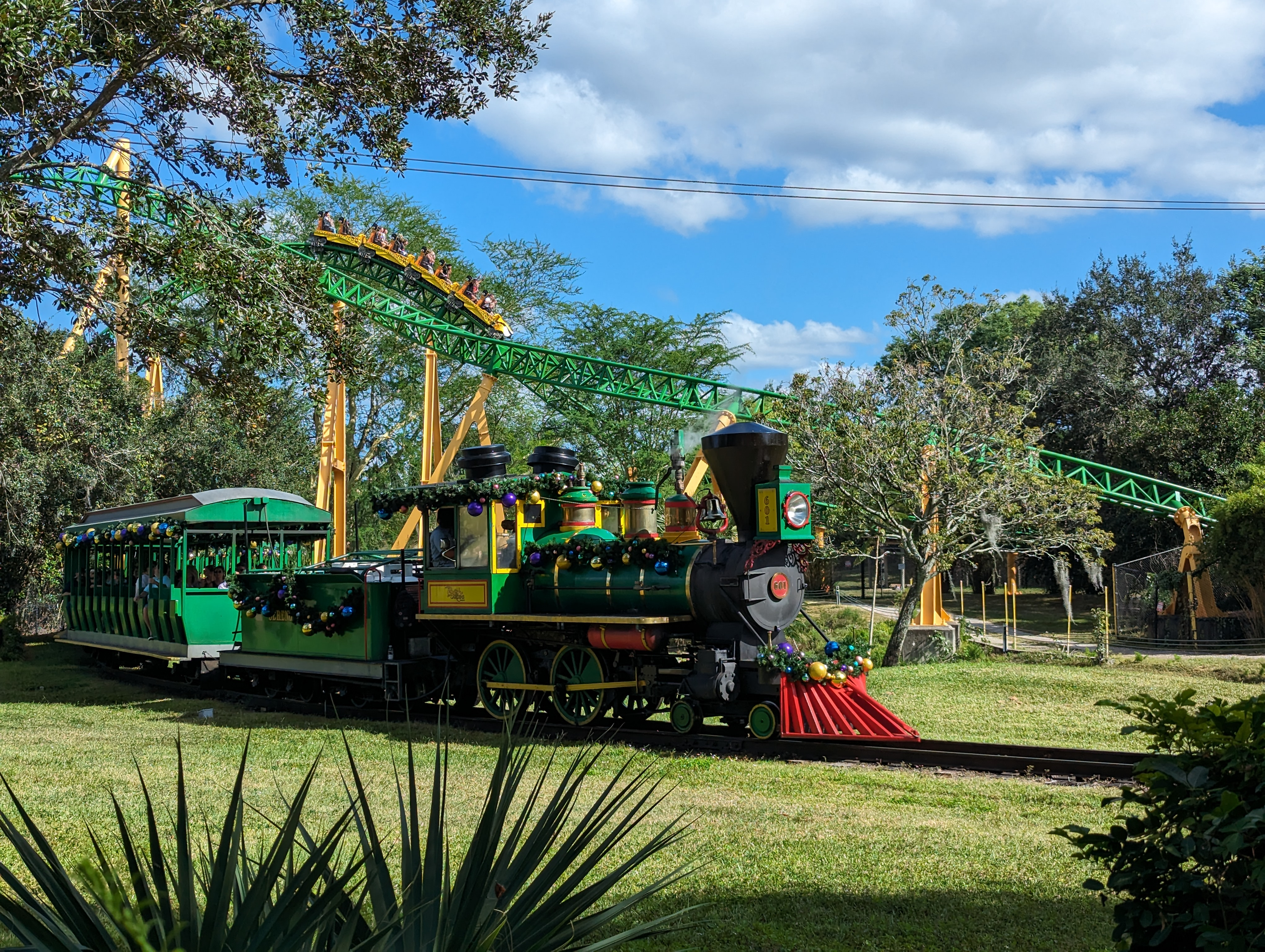
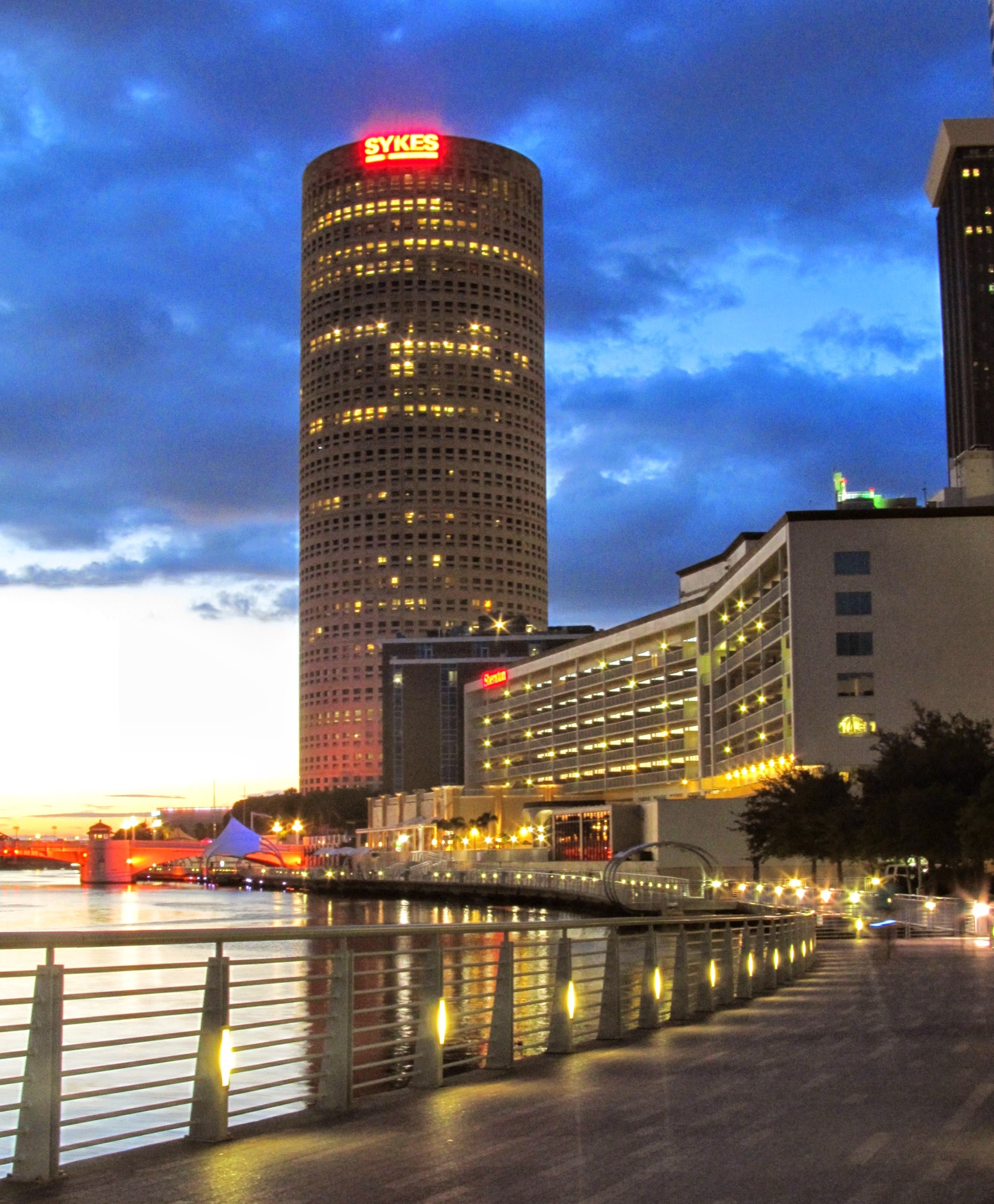
- Downtown Tampa Tampa Theatre University of Tampa Ybor City Raymond James Stadium Busch Gardens Tampa Bay Tampa Riverwalk

- Flag Seal Wordmark
- Nicknames: Cigar City, The Big Guava
- Interactive map of Tampa
- Location within Florida Location within the United States
- Coordinates: 27°56′42″N 82°27′30″W
- Country: United States
- State: Florida
- County: Hillsborough
- Settled (Fort Brooke): 1823
- Incorporated (Village of Tampa): January 18, 1849
- Incorporated (Town of Tampa): September 10, 1853, and August 11, 1873
- Incorporated (City of Tampa): December 15, 1855 (Note: Original city charter revoked by Florida Legislature on October 4, 1869) and July 15, 1887

Government
  - Type: Strong mayor–council
  - Mayor: Jane Castor (D)
  - Legislative: Tampa City Council

Area
  - City: 175.83 sq mi (455.40 km^{2})
  - Land: 114.02 sq mi (295.30 km^{2})
  - Water: 61.81 sq mi (160.10 km^{2}) 35.3%
  - Urban: 968.9 sq mi (2,509.5 km^{2})
  - Metro: 2,554 sq mi (6,610 km^{2})
- Elevation: 10 ft (3.0 m)

Population (2020)
  - City: 384,959
  - Estimate (2025): 413,554 ▲
  - Rank: 49th in the US
  - Density: 3,376.4/sq mi (1,303.6/km^{2})
  - Urban: 2,783,045 (US: 17th)
  - Urban density: 2,870/sq mi (1,109/km^{2})
  - Metro: 3,175,275 (US: 18th)
- Demonym(s): Tampan, Tampanian, Tampeño

GDP
  - Metro: $243.268 billion (2023)
- Time zone: UTC−5 (EST)
  - Summer (DST): UTC−4 (EDT)
- ZIP codes: 33601–33626, 33629–33631, 33633–33635, 33637, 33646, 33647, 33650, 33655, 33660–33664, 33672–33675, 33677, 33679–33682, 33684–33689, 33694
- Area codes: 813, 656
- FIPS code: 12-71000
- GNIS feature ID: 2405568
- Website: tampa.gov

Tampa (/ˈtæmpə/ TAM-pə) is a city on the Gulf Coast of the U.S. state of Florida and the county seat of Hillsborough County. Tampa's borders include the north shore of Tampa Bay and the east shore of Old Tampa Bay. It is the third-most populous city in Florida (after Jacksonville and Miami) and the 49th-most populous city in the U.S., with a population of 403,364 at the 2020 census. The Tampa Bay metropolitan area, at over 3.42 million residents, is the second-largest metropolitan area in Florida and 17th-largest metropolitan area in the United States. The Greater Tampa Bay area has over 4 million residents and generally includes the Tampa and Sarasota metro areas.

Tampa's origins can be traced to the establishment of Fort Brooke in 1824, soon after the United States acquired the Florida territory from Spain. The surrounding settlement of Tampa was formally incorporated in 1849 but remained small and isolated until the mid-1880s, when the arrival of Henry B. Plant's railroad and Vicente Martinez Ybor's cigar factories jump-started a period of rapid economic and population growth. "Tampa Town" was reincorporated into the city of Tampa in 1887 and had evolved into a prosperous modern community by the early 20th century.

In the 21st century, Tampa has developed a diverse economy, driven by healthcare, finance, insurance, technology, cybersecurity, tourism, construction, professional services and maritime trade. Port Tampa Bay is the largest port in Florida, responsible for over $15 billion in economic impact. The city hosts a number of major employers, including Bloomin' Brands, WellCare, and Fortune 500 companies Crown Holdings and The Mosaic Company. Tampa hosts the headquarters of United States Central Command at MacDill Air Force Base, described as the most important military HQ after the Pentagon.

Tampa's cultural landscape features the Tampa Museum of Art, Straz Center for the Performing Arts, and the historic Ybor City district, which reflects the city's Cuban and Spanish heritage. The city is also home to prominent educational institutions, including the University of South Florida and University of Tampa. The area's major league professional sports teams include the Tampa Bay Buccaneers (NFL), Tampa Bay Lightning (NHL), and Tampa Bay Rays (MLB).

== Etymology ==
The earliest instance of the name "Tampa", in the form "Tanpa", appears in the memoirs of Hernando de Escalante Fontaneda, who spent 17 years as a captive of the Calusa and traveled through much of peninsular Florida. He described Tanpa as an important Calusa town to the north of the Calusa domain, possibly under another chief. Archaeologist Jerald Milanich places the town of Tanpa at the mouth of Charlotte Harbor. The entrances to Tampa Bay and Charlotte Harbor are obscured by barrier islands, and their locations, and the names applied to them, were a source of confusion to explorers, surveyors and map-makers from the 16th century to the 18th century. Bahía Tampa and Bahía de Espíritu Santo were each used, at one time or another, for the modern Tampa Bay and Charlotte Harbor.

Tampa Bay was labeled Bahía de Espíritu Santo (Bay of the Holy Spirit) in the earliest Spanish maps of Florida. It became known as B. Tampa (Bahía Tampa or Tampa Bay) as early as 1576. In 1601, "B. Tampa", corresponding to Tampa Bay, appeared for the first time on a printed map in Antonio de Herrera y Tordesillas's Description del Destricto del Audiencia de la Espanola, from his book Descripcion de las Indias Ocidentales, printed in Madrid.

A 1705 British map also shows B. Tampa, with "Carlos Bay" for Charlotte Harbor to the south. A 1748 British map had "B. del Spirito Santo" for Tampa Bay and "Carlos Bay" to the south. A Spanish map of 1757 renamed Tampa Bay as "San Fernando". As late as 1774, Bernard Romans called Tampa Bay "Bay of Espiritu Santo", with "Tampa Bay" restricted to the Northwest arm, what is now Old Tampa Bay, and the northeast arm named "Hillsborough Bay". The name may have come from the Calusa language or possibly, the Timucua language. Some scholars have compared "Tampa" to "itimpi", which means "close to" or "nearby" in the Creek language, but its meaning is not known.

In 1849, when the pioneer community living near the U.S. Army outpost of Fort Brooke was incorporated, it was called "Tampa Town". In 1855, the name was shortened to simply "Tampa".

People from Tampa are generally known as "Tampans", "Tampanians", or "Tampeños". In 2014, local authorities consulted by Michael Kruse of the Tampa Bay Times suggest that "Tampan" was historically more common, while "Tampanian" became popular when the former term came to be seen as a potential insult. A mix of Cuban, Italian, and Spanish immigrants began arriving in the late 1800s to found and work in the new communities of Ybor City and West Tampa. By about 1900, these newcomers came to be known as "Tampeños", or "Tampeñas" for females, a term that is still sometimes used to refer to their descendants living in the area, and potentially, to all residents of Tampa regardless of their ethnic background.

== History ==
=== Indigenous peoples and European exploration ===
The shores of Tampa Bay have been inhabited for thousands of years. A variant of the Weeden Island culture developed in the area by about 2,000 years ago. Archeological evidence suggests that these residents relied on the sea for most of their resources, as a vast majority of inhabited sites have been found on or near the shoreline, with little evidence of farming. At the time of European contact in the early 16th century, several chiefdoms of the Safety Harbor culture dominated the area.

Early Spanish explorers interacted most extensively with the Tocobaga, whose principal town was at the northern end of Old Tampa Bay near today's Safety Harbor in Pinellas County. While there is a substantial historical record of the Tocobaga, and the Calusa, who lived to the south, there is less surviving documentation describing the Pohoy, who lived near the mouth of the Hillsborough River near today's downtown Tampa. Evidence suggests that the language and culture of the Pohoy and other lesser-known groups around the bay were very similar to that of the Tocobaga.

Expeditions led by Pánfilo de Narváez and Hernando de Soto landed near Tampa, but neither conquistador stayed long. There is no natural gold or silver in Florida, and the native inhabitants repulsed Spanish attempts to establish a permanent settlement or convert them to Catholicism. The fighting resulted in a few deaths, but the many more deaths were caused by infectious diseases brought from Europe, which devastated the population of Native Americans across Florida and the entire Western Hemisphere. The indigenous cultures of the Tampa Bay area collapsed by around 1600, leaving the west coast of Spanish Florida largely depopulated and ignored for more than 200 years.

In the mid-18th century, events in the American colonies and the early United States drove the Seminole people into northern Florida. They did not move into central Florida until after the United States gained control of Florida in 1821.

Before the American period, the Tampa Bay area had a handful of residents: Cuban and Native American fishermen who established small seasonal camps called "ranchos" on the shores of Tampa Bay. The largest was at the mouth of Spanishtown Creek in today's Hyde Park neighborhood along Bayshore Boulevard.

=== U.S. control ===
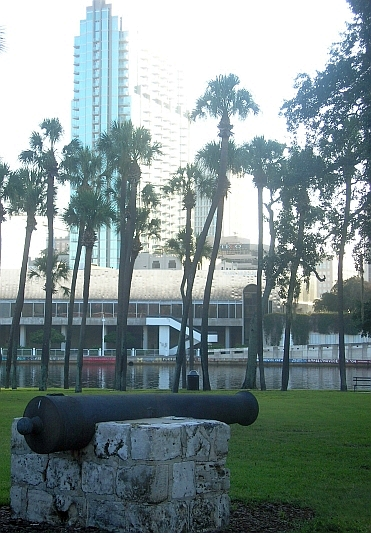
A surviving Ft. Brooke cannon on the University of Tampa campus

After purchasing Florida from Spain in 1821, the United States built forts and trading posts in the new territory. Fort Brooke was established in January 1824 at the mouth of the Hillsborough River on Tampa Bay, in Downtown Tampa.

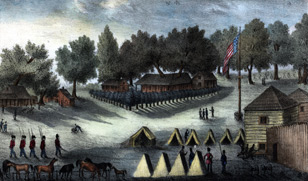
Fort Brooke c. 1840

Tampa was initially an isolated frontier outpost. The sparse civilian population practically abandoned the area during the Second Seminole War from 1835 to 1842, after which the Seminoles were forced out and many settlers returned.

Florida became the 27th state on March 3, 1845. On January 18, 1849, Tampa was officially incorporated as the "Village of Tampa." It was home to 185 civilians, or 974 total residents including military personnel, in 1850. Tampa was reincorporated as a town on December 15, 1855.

=== Civil War and Reconstruction ===
During the Civil War, Florida seceded along with most of the southern states to form the Confederate States of America, and Fort Brooke was defended by Confederate troops. Martial law was declared in Tampa in January 1862, and Tampa's city government ceased to operate for the duration of the war.

In 1861, the Union Navy set up a blockade around many southern ports to cut off the Confederacy. Several US Navy ships were stationed near the mouth of Tampa Bay, but small blockade running ships were often able to slip by the blockade to deliver cattle to Spanish Cuba, earning gold for the Confederate cause.

On June 30, 1862, the gunboat USS Sagamore sailed into Tampa Bay and opened fire on Fort Brooke, which returned fire. The Sagamore withdrew after a few hours, and the Battle of Tampa caused little damage. During the Battle of Fort Brooke on October 16 and the Battle of Ballast Point on October 18, 1863, Union forces inflicted serious damage to Tampa's economy when, under the cover of another bombardment of the fort, troops landed and destroyed two blockade running ships that had been hidden upstream along the Hillsborough River.

In May 1864, Union troops landed again and took Fort Brooke largely unopposed. They destroyed much of the fort's facilities and confiscated the remaining military supplies other than the cannons, which they tossed into the Hillsborough River, then left the "desolate" town after two days.

The Civil War ended in April 1865 with a Confederate defeat. In May 1865, Union troops arrived in Tampa to occupy the fort and the town as part of Reconstruction. They remained until August 1869.

During the immediate post-war period, Tampa was a poor, isolated fishing village with about 1,000 residents and little industry. Yellow fever, borne by mosquitoes from nearby swamps, broke out several times during the 1860s and 1870s, causing more residents to leave. In 1869, residents voted to abolish the city of Tampa government.

In 1870, the population of "Tampa Town" was about 800, and dropped to about 700 by 1880. Fort Brooke was decommissioned in 1883, further impacting the local economy in the short run, but opening up the waterfront for development. Except for two cannons displayed on the University of Tampa campus, all traces of the fort are gone.

=== 1880s economic prosperity ===
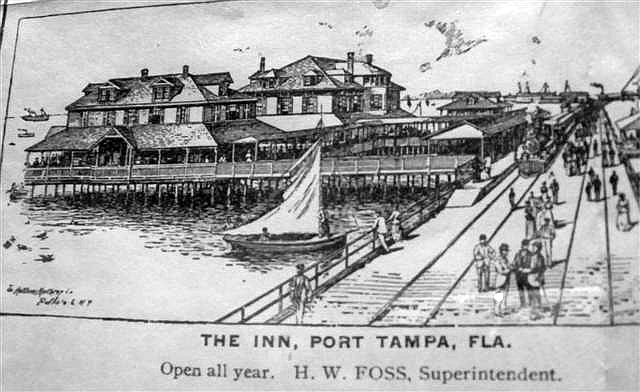
Port Tampa Inn, with rail line in front of hotel, c. 1900

In the mid-1880s, Tampa's fortunes took several sudden turns for the better. In 1883, phosphate was discovered in the Bone Valley region southeast of Tampa. The mineral, vital for the production of fertilizers and other products, was soon being shipped from the Port of Tampa in great volume. Tampa is still a major phosphate exporter.

The discovery of phosphate, the arrival of Plant's railroad, and the founding of Ybor City and West Tampa—all in the mid-1880s—were crucial to Tampa's development. The once-struggling village of Tampa became a bustling boomtown almost overnight and had grown into one of the largest cities in Florida by 1900.

==== Plant's railroad ====
In late 1883, Henry B. Plant's narrow-gauge South Florida Railroad reached Tampa and its port, connecting the small town to the nation's railroad system after years of efforts by local leaders. Previously, Tampa's overland transportation links had consisted of sandy roads stretching across the Florida countryside. Plant's railroad made it much easier to get goods in and out of the Tampa Bay area. Phosphate and commercial fishing exports could be sent north by rail, and many new products were brought into the Tampa market, along with the first tourists.

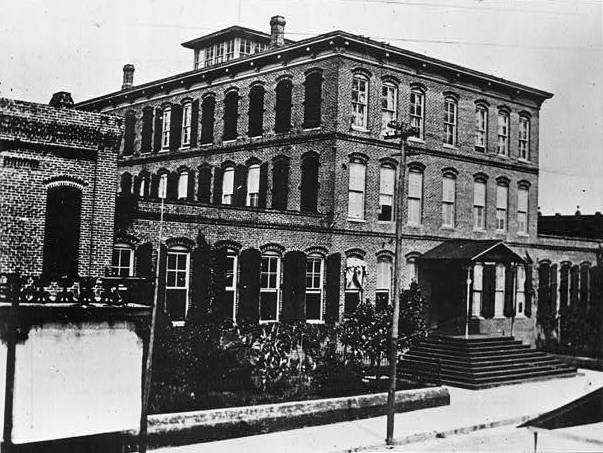
Ybor's first cigar factory 1916

==== Ybor's cigars ====
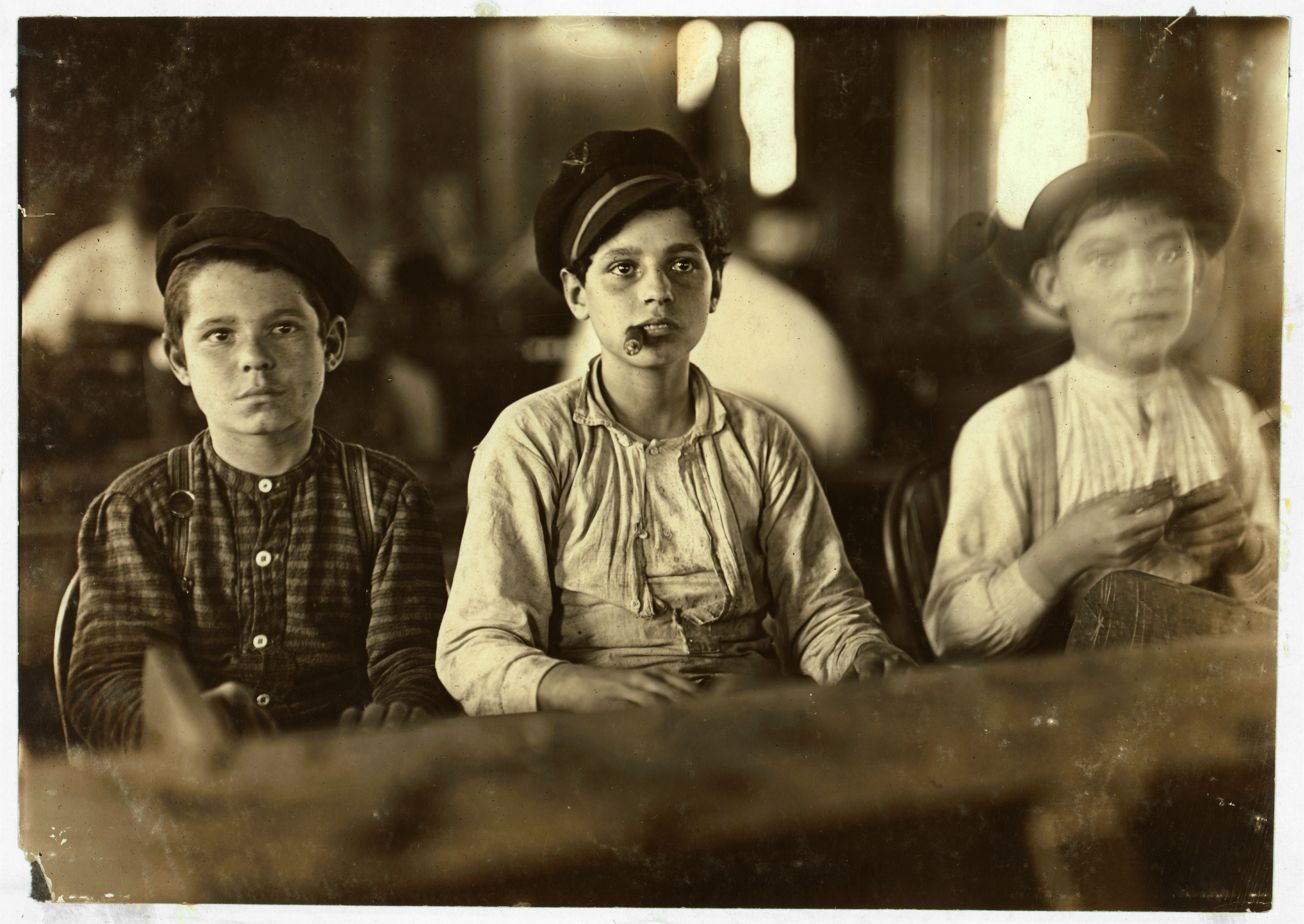
Rolling cigars, 1909. Photo by Lewis Hine.

The new railroad link enabled another important industry to come to Tampa. In 1885, the Tampa Board of Trade enticed Vicente Martinez Ybor to move his cigar manufacturing operations to Tampa from Key West. Proximity to Cuba made importation of "clear Havana tobacco" easy by sea, and Plant's railroad made shipment of finished cigars to the rest of the US market easy by land.

Since Tampa was still a small town at the time, with a population less than 5,000, Ybor built hundreds of small houses around his factory to accommodate the immediate influx of mainly Cuban and Spanish cigar workers. Ybor City's factories rolled their first cigars in 1886, and many different cigar manufacturers moved their operations to town in ensuing years. Many Italian and a few Eastern European Jewish immigrants arrived starting in the late 1880s, opening businesses and shops that catered to cigar workers.

By 1900, over 10,000 immigrants had moved to the neighborhood. Several thousand more Cuban immigrants built West Tampa, another cigar-centric suburb founded a few years later by Hugh MacFarlane. Between them, two "Latin" communities combined to exponentially expand Tampa's population, economic base, and tax revenues, as Tampa became the "Cigar Capital of the World".

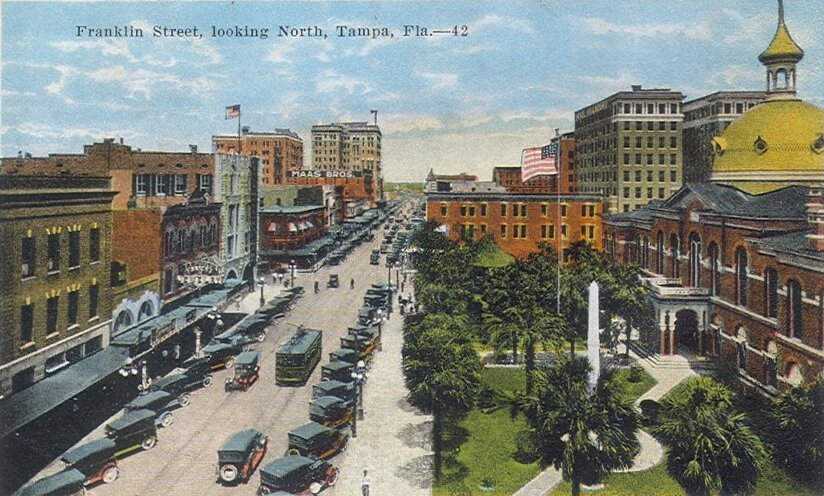
Franklin Street, looking north past the old Hillsborough County Courthouse, Tampa, 1922

=== Early 20th century ===
During the first few decades of the 20th century, the cigar-making industry was the backbone of Tampa's economy. The factories in Ybor City and West Tampa made an enormous number of cigars—in the peak year of 1929, over 500 million cigars were hand rolled in Tampa.

In 1904, a civic association of local businessmen dubbed themselves Ye Mystic Krewe of Gasparilla, named after local mythical pirate José Gaspar, and staged an "invasion" of the city followed by a parade. With a few exceptions, the Gasparilla Pirate Festival has been held every year since.

=== Bolita and organized crime ===
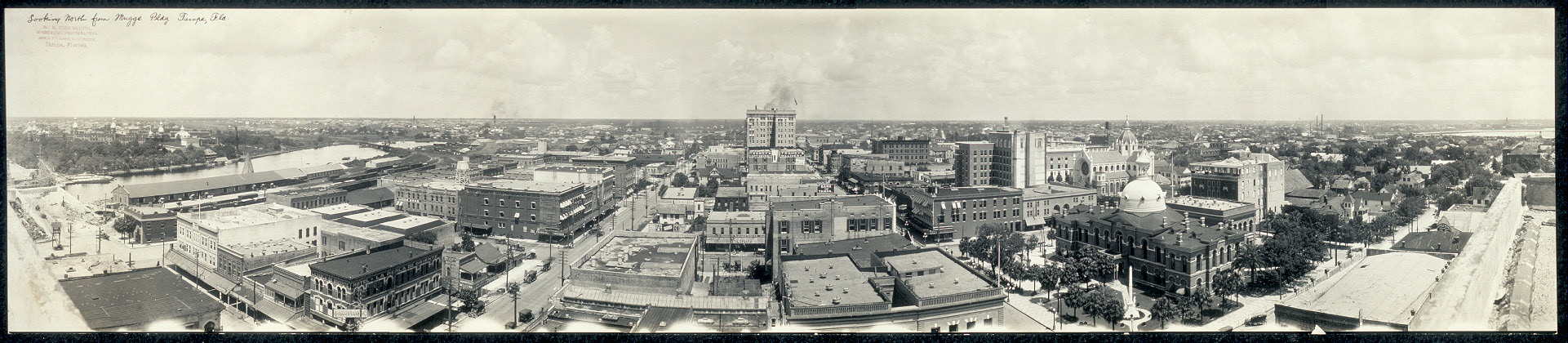
A 1913 panorama of downtown Tampa

Beginning in the late 19th century, illegal bolita lotteries were very popular among the Tampa working classes, especially in Ybor City. In the early 1920s, this small-time operation was taken over by Charlie Wall, the rebellious son of a prominent Tampa family, and went big-time. Bolita was able to openly thrive only because of kick-backs and bribes to key local politicians and law enforcement officials, and many were on the take.

Profits from the bolita lotteries and Prohibition-era bootlegging led to the development of several organized crime factions in Tampa. Charlie Wall was the first major boss, but various power struggles culminated in consolidation of control by Sicilian mafioso Santo Trafficante Sr. and his faction in the 1950s. After his death in 1954 from cancer, control passed to his son, Santo Trafficante Jr., who established alliances with families in New York City and extended his power throughout Florida and into Batista-era Cuba.

The era of rampant and open corruption ended in the 1950s, when Estes Kefauver's traveling organized crime hearings came to town and were followed by the sensational misconduct trials of several local officials. Although many of the worst offenders in government and the mob were not charged, the trials helped to end the sense of lawlessness which had prevailed in Tampa for decades.

=== Mid to late 20th century ===
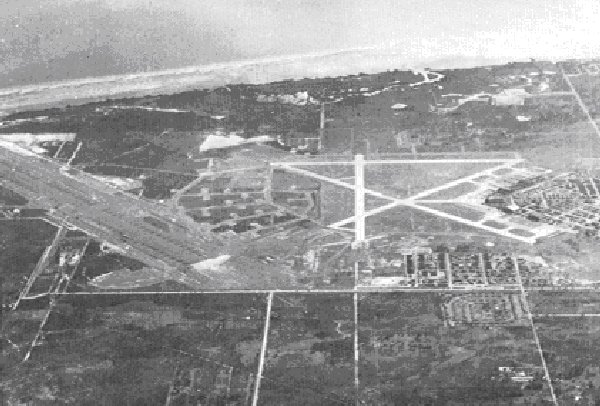
MacDill Air Force Base during World War II

Tampa grew considerably as a result of World War II. Prior to the United States' involvement in the conflict, construction began on MacDill Field, which served as a main base for Army Air Corps and later Army Air Forces operations just before and during World War II, with multiple auxiliary airfields around the Tampa Bay area and surrounding counties. At the end of the war, MacDill remained as an active military installation, while the auxiliary fields reverted to civilian control. Two of these auxiliary fields later became the present-day Tampa International Airport and St. Petersburg–Clearwater International Airport. With the establishment of an independent U.S. Air Force in 1947, MacDill Field became MacDill Air Force Base.

In the 1950s and 1960s, Tampa had record-setting population growth that has not been seen since. This growth spurred expansion of Tampa's highways and bridges, bringing thousands into the city and creating opportunities for Tampa business owners, who welcomed the influx of tourists and new residents. It was during this time period in Tampa's history that two of the most popular tourist attractions in the area were developed – Busch Gardens and Lowry Park. Many of the well-known institutions that play an important role in the economic development of Tampa were established during this time period.

The University of South Florida was established in North Tampa in 1956 and opened for students in September 1960. The school spurred the construction of several residential and commercial developments in the previously agriculture-dominated area around the new campus. Overall, Tampa continued to expand away from the city center during the 1960s as new hospitals, schools, churches and subdivisions all began appearing to accommodate the growth. Many business offices began moving away from the traditional downtown office building into more convenient neighborhood office plazas.

In 1970, the U.S. Census Bureau reported Tampa's population as being 80.0% white and 19.7% black.

Four attempts have been made to consolidate the municipal government of the city of Tampa with the county government of Hillsborough County, in 1967, 1970, 1971, and 1972, all of which failed at the ballot box. The greatest loss was the most recent attempt in 1972, with the final tally being 33,160 (31%) in favor and 73,568 (69%) against the proposed charter.

The biggest recent growth of Tampa was the development of New Tampa, which started in 1988 when the city annexed a mostly rural area of 24 sq mi (62 km^{2}) between I-275 and I-75.

East Tampa, historically a mostly black community, was the scene of several race riots during and for some time after the period of racial segregation, mainly due to problems between residents and the Tampa Police Department.

== Geography ==
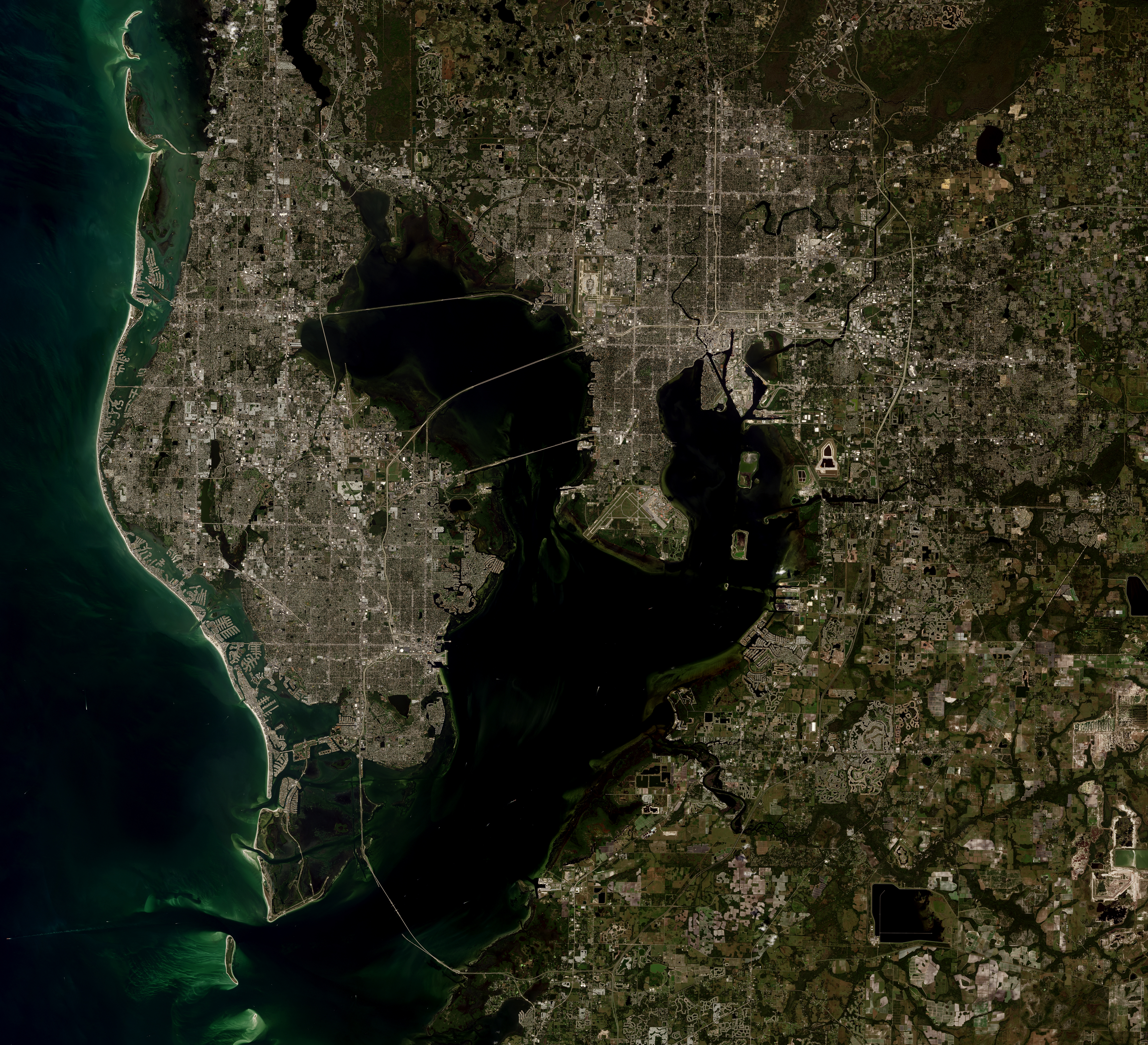
A 2016 Landsat 8 image of the Tampa Bay Region

=== Topography ===
According to the United States Census Bureau, Tampa has a total area of 175.3 sq mi (453.9 km^{2}), including 113.4 sq mi (293.7 km^{2}) of land and 61.8 sq mi (160.1 km^{2}) (35.3%) of water. The highest point in Tampa is 48 feet (15 m) above sea level. Tampa is bordered by two bodies of water, Old Tampa Bay and Hillsborough Bay, which flow together to form Tampa Bay, which flows into the Gulf of Mexico.

The Hillsborough River flows into Hillsborough Bay, passing directly in front of Downtown Tampa and supplying Tampa's main source of fresh water. The Palm River is a smaller river, flowing from just east of the city into McKay Bay, which is a smaller inlet, sited at the northeast end of Hillsborough Bay. Tampa's geography is marked by the Interbay Peninsula, which divides Hillsborough Bay in the east, from Old Tampa Bay in the west.

=== Cityscape ===
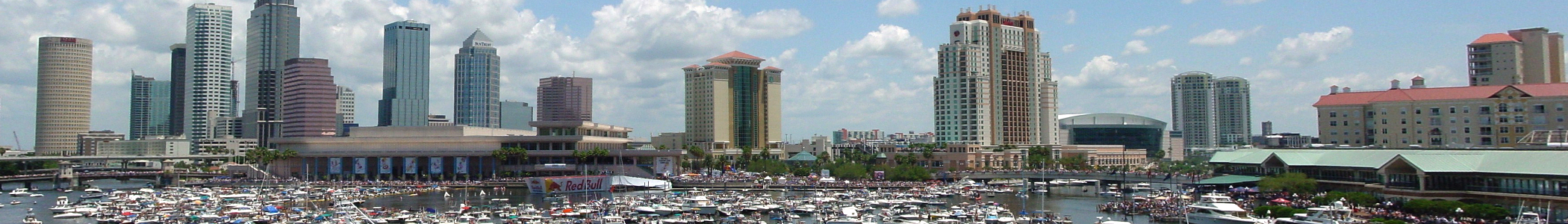
A panorama of the Downtown Tampa skyline during the Red Bull Flugtag, July 2008
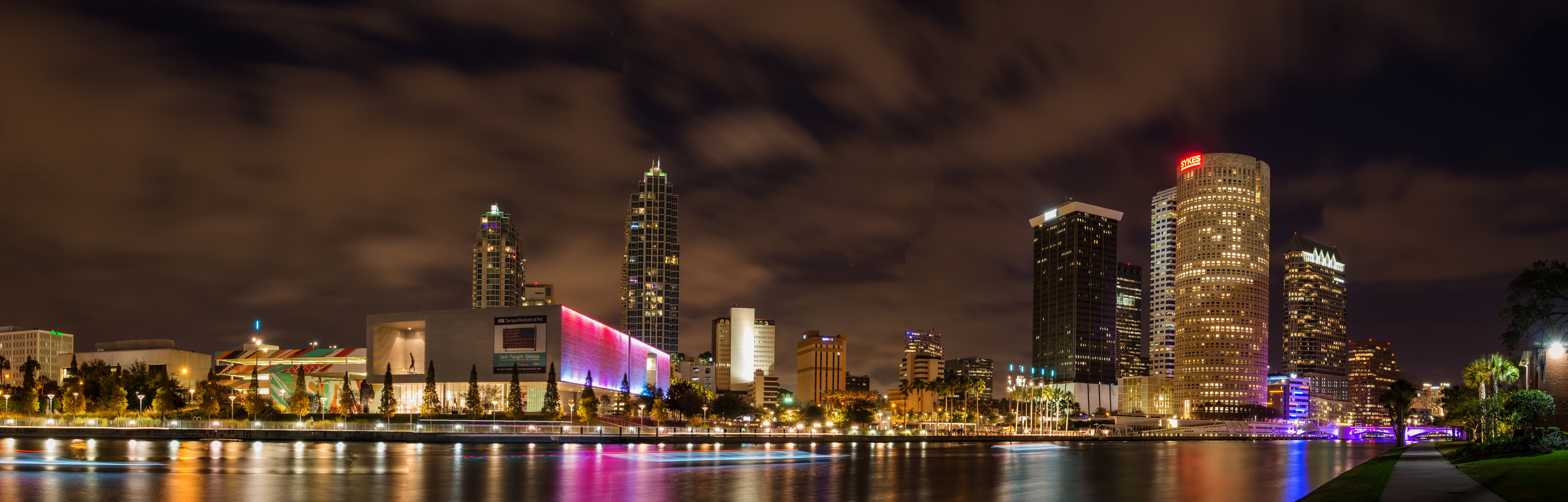
A panorama of Downtown Tampa at night, as seen from across the Hillsborough River

==== Neighborhoods ====
Tampa is divided into many neighborhoods, many of which were towns and unincorporated communities annexed by the growing city. Generally, Tampa is divided into the following areas: Downtown Tampa, New Tampa, West Tampa, East Tampa, North Tampa, and South Tampa. Well-known neighborhoods include Ybor City, Forest Hills, Ballast Point, Sulphur Springs, Seminole Heights, Tampa Heights, Palma Ceia, Hyde Park, Davis Islands, Harbour Island, Tampa Palms, College Hill, Water Street, Channelside and non-residential areas of Gary and the Westshore Business District.

==== Architecture ====
Tampa displays a wide variety of architectural designs and styles. Most of Tampa's high rises demonstrate post-modern architecture. The design for the renovated Tampa Museum of Art displays post-modern architecture, while the city hall and the Tampa Theatre belong to Art Deco architecture.

The Tampa mayor Pam Iorio made the redevelopment of Tampa's downtown, especially residential development, a priority. Several residential and mixed-development high-rises have been constructed. Another of Mayor Iorio's initiatives was the Tampa Riverwalk, a mixed-use path along the Hillsborough River in downtown. Channelside was approved to undergo major renovations by Tampa Bay Lightning owner Jeff Vinik along with Bill Gates and other investors.

Several museums have opened, including new homes for the Tampa Bay History Center, the Glazer Children's Museum, and the Tampa Museum of Art. The breakdown of development for the rest of the plan is as follows: 39% residential units, 29% office space, 15% hotels, 8% retail, 7% other, and 2% cultural uses. Mayor Bob Buckhorn continued these developments, which are bearing fruit during the term of Mayor Jane Castor.

Tampa is the site of several skyscrapers. Overall, there are 30 completed buildings that rise over 250 feet (76 m) high. Tampa also has 147 high-rises, second only to Miami in the state of Florida. The tallest building in the city is 100 North Tampa, formerly the AmSouth Building, which rises 42 floors and 579 ft (176 m) in Downtown Tampa. The structure was completed in 1992, and is the tallest building in Florida outside of Miami and Jacksonville.

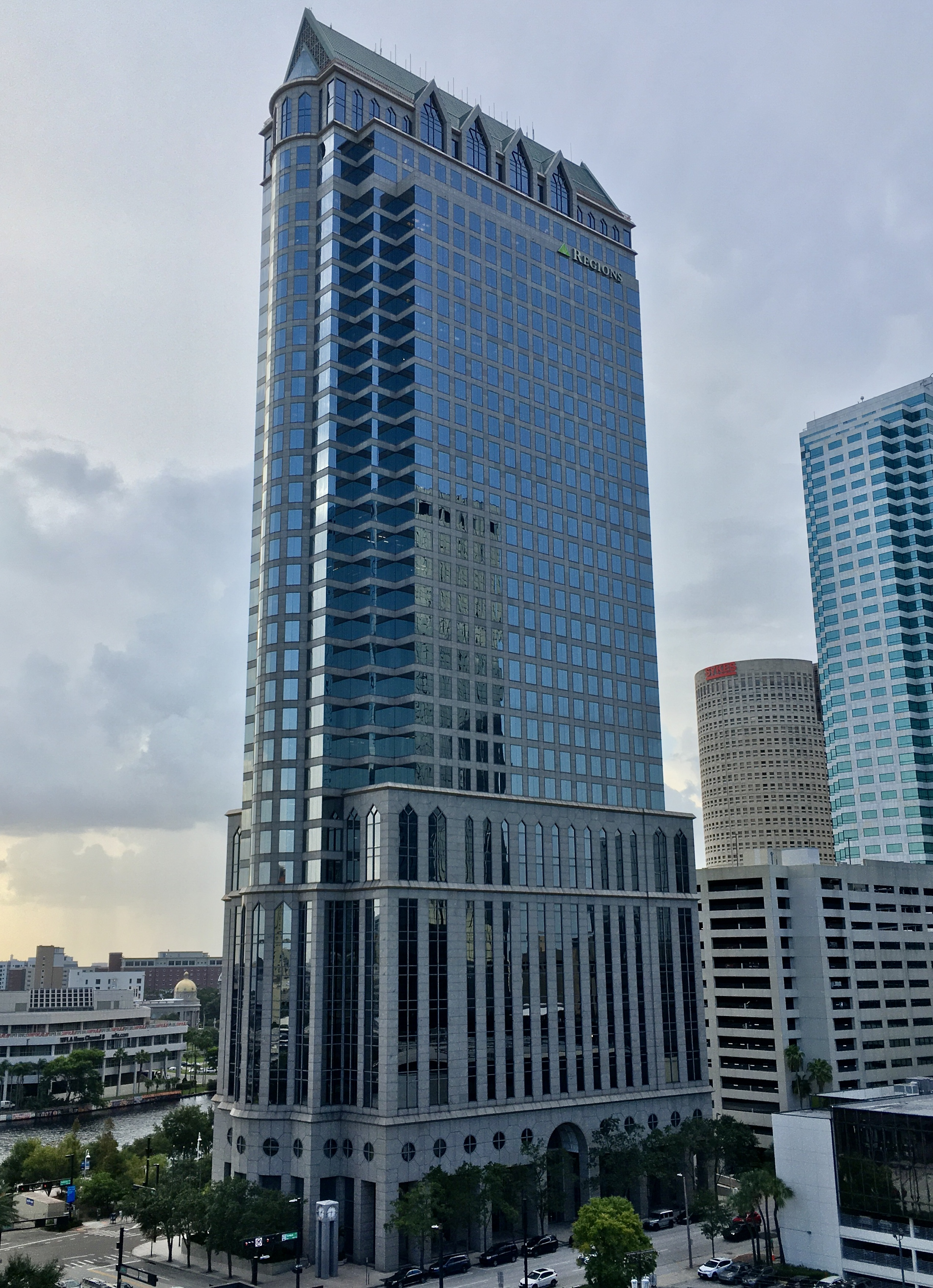
100 North Tampa (1992)

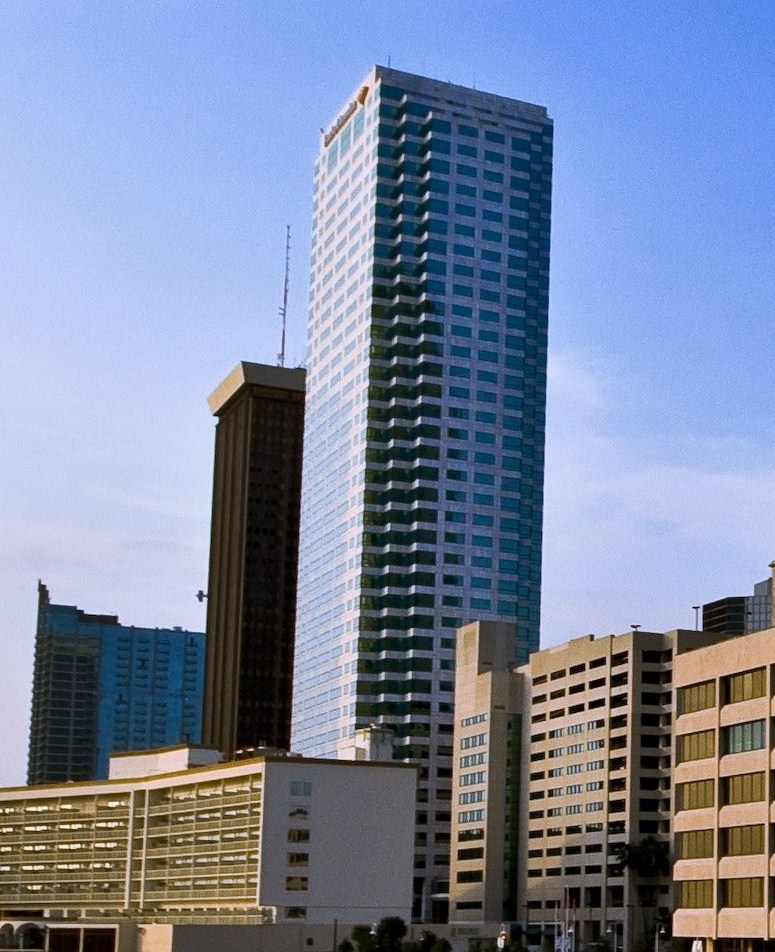
Bank of America Plaza (1986)

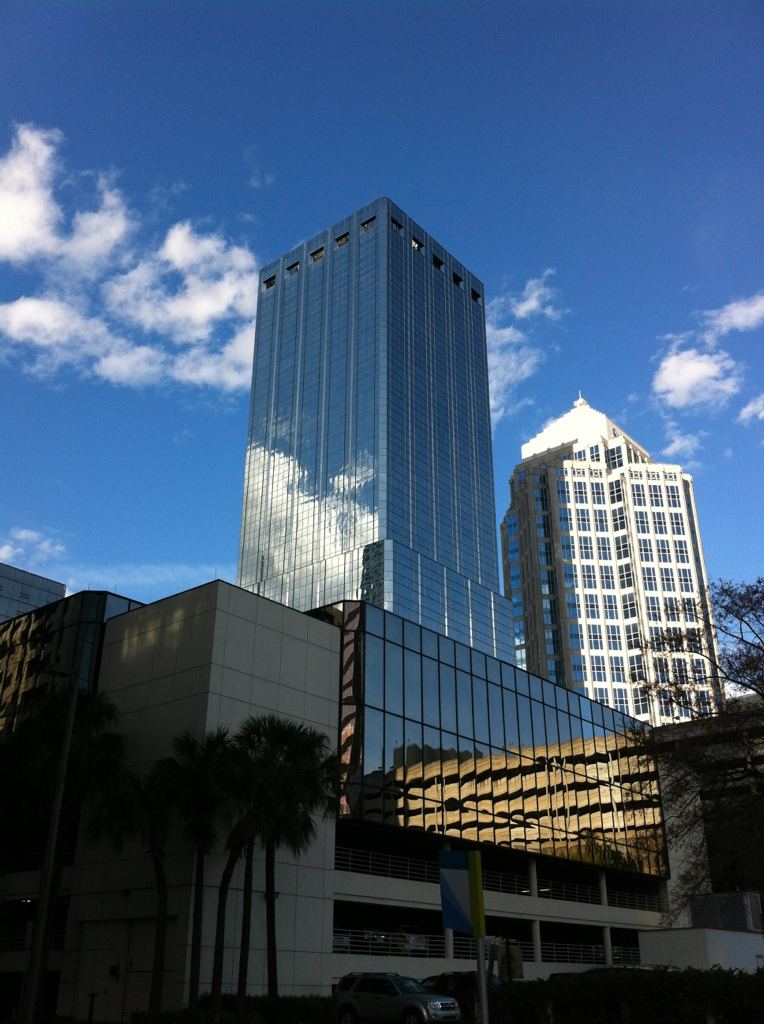
One Tampa City Center (1981)

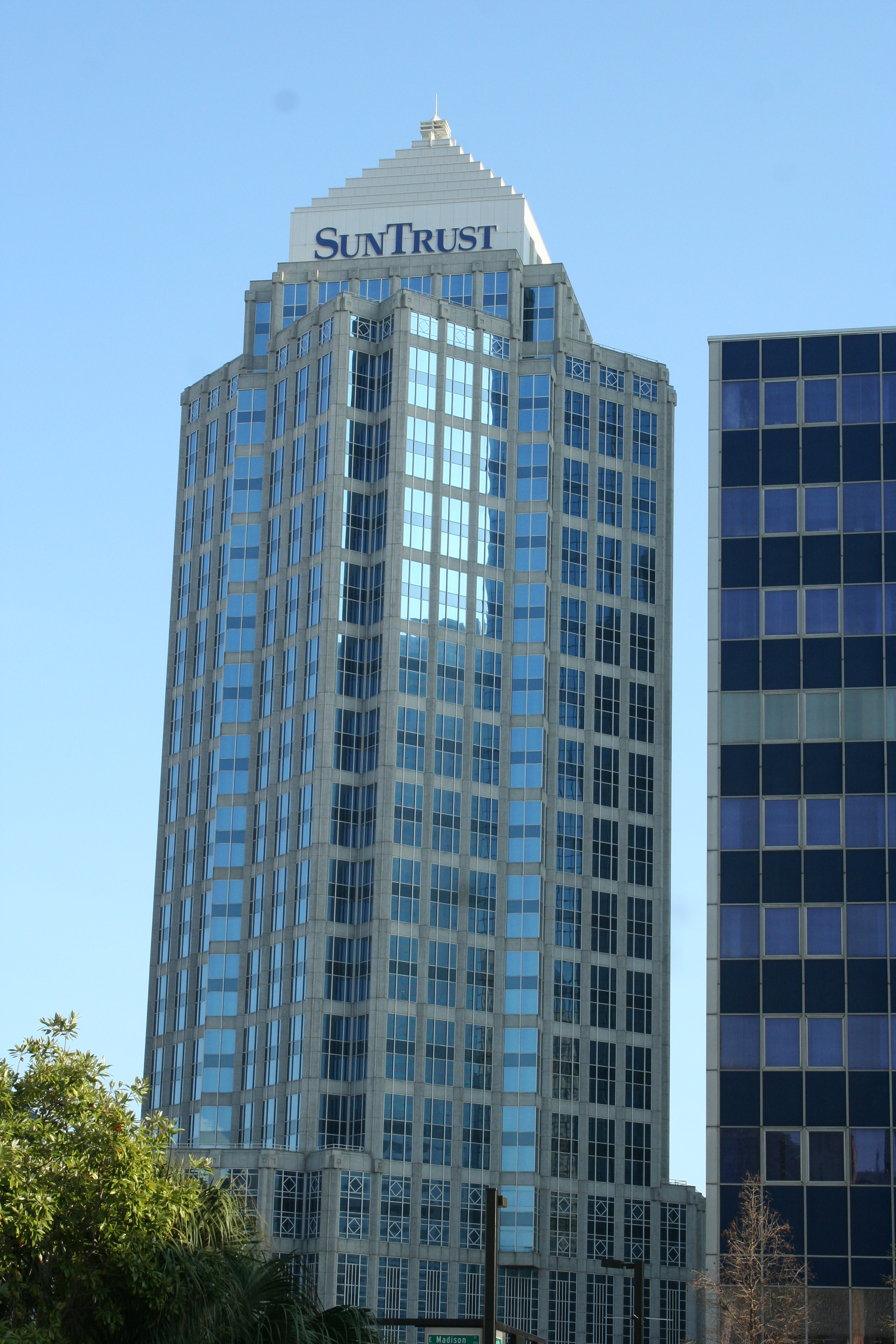
SunTrust Financial Centre (1992)

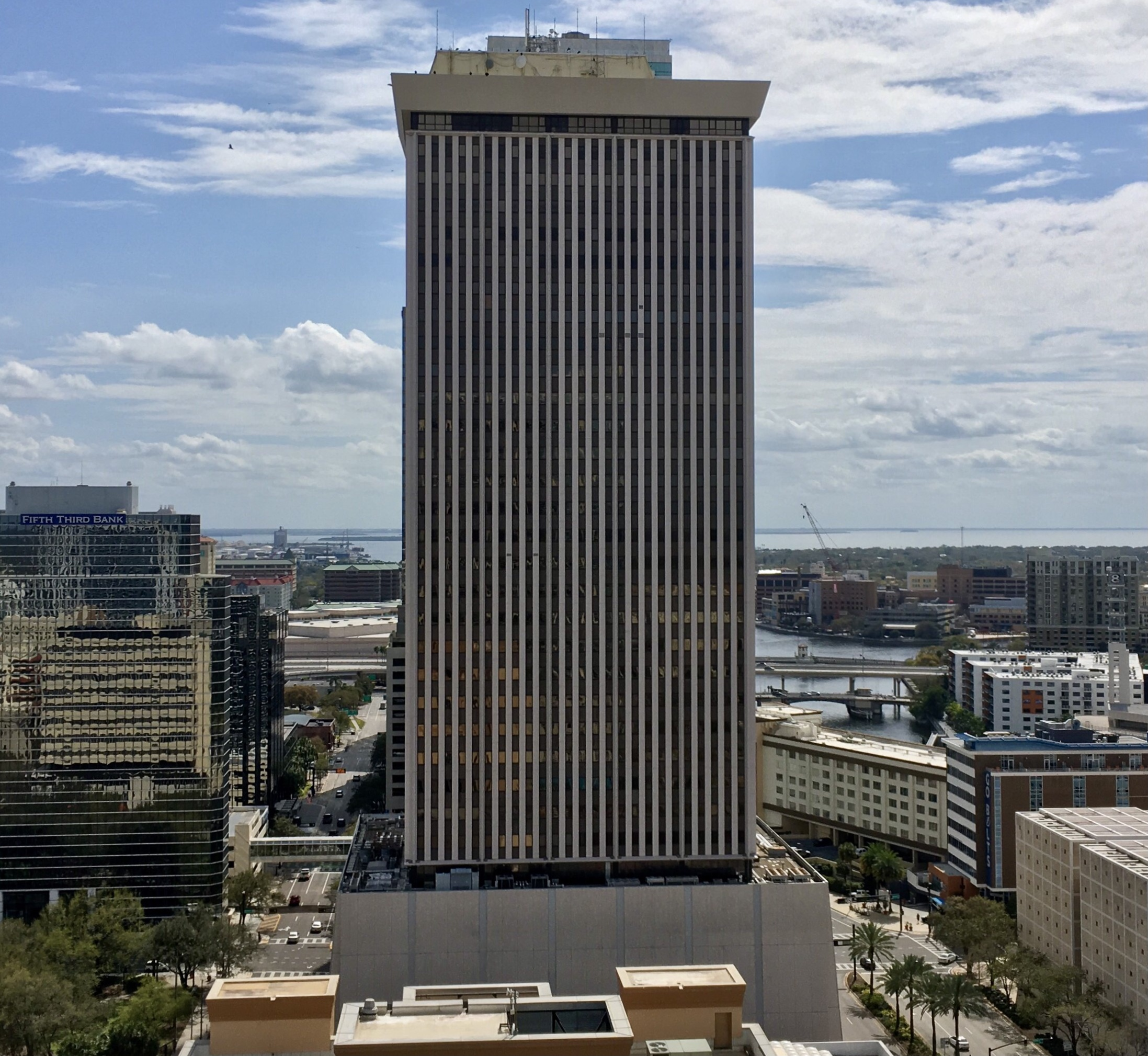
Park Tower (1972)

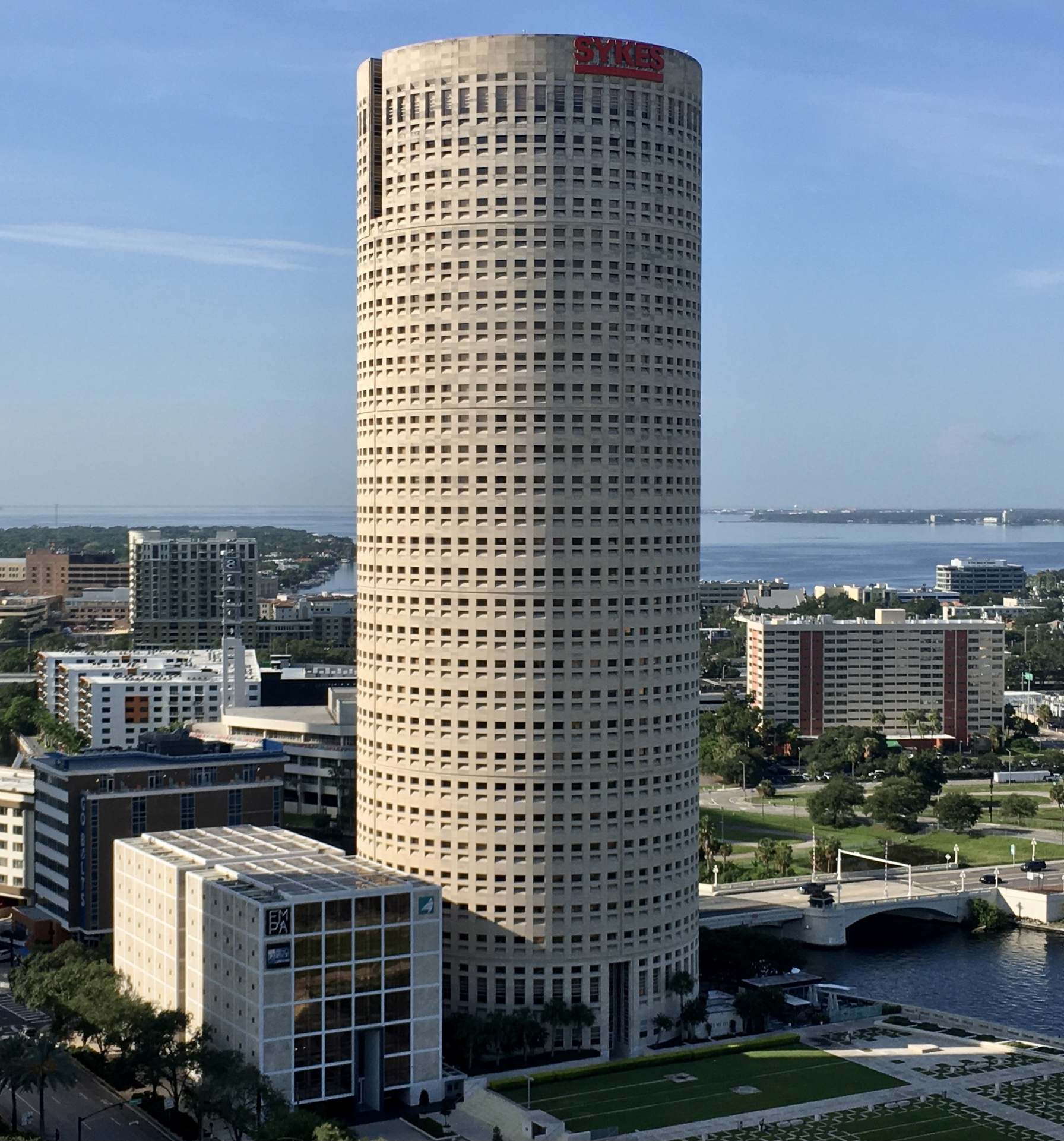
Rivergate Tower (1988)

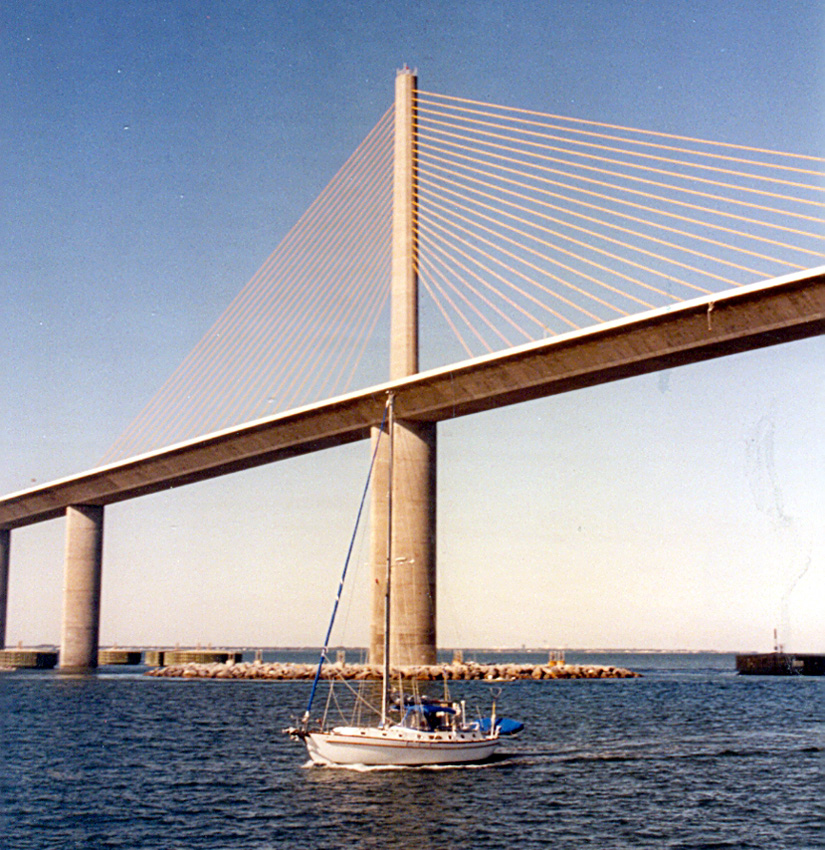
The Sunshine Skyway Bridge (1987)

===== Landmarks =====
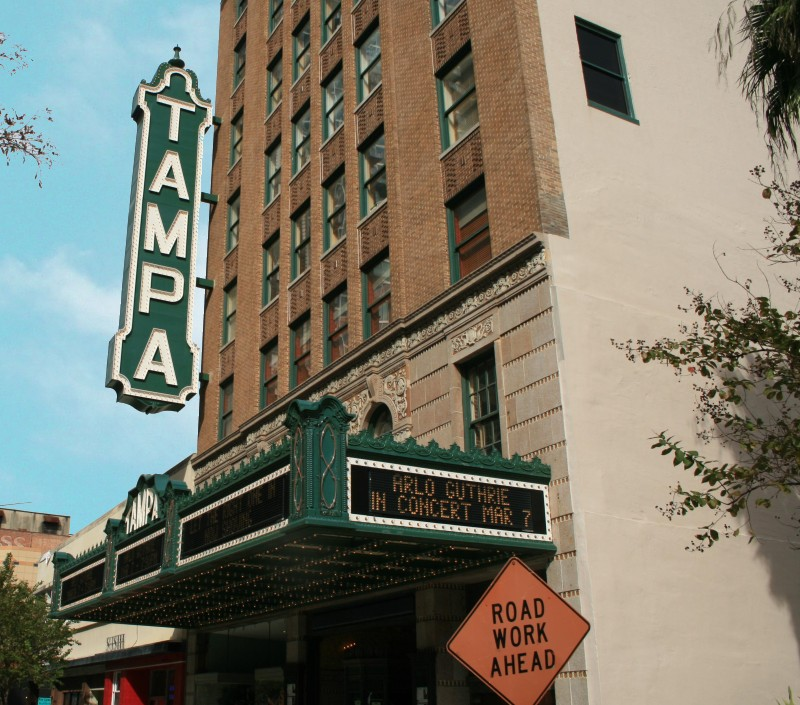
Tampa Theatre

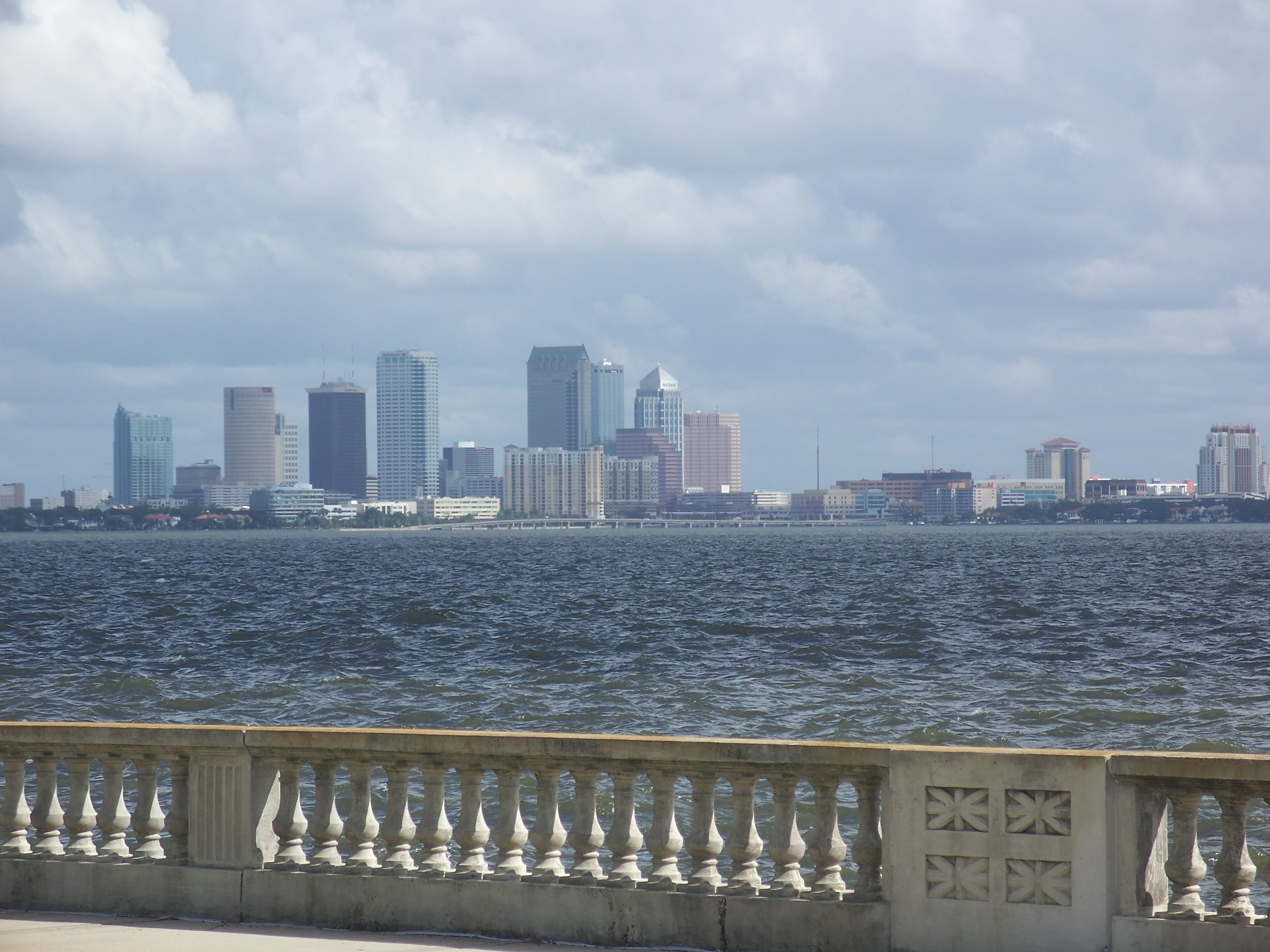
Downtown Tampa as seen from Bayshore Boulevard

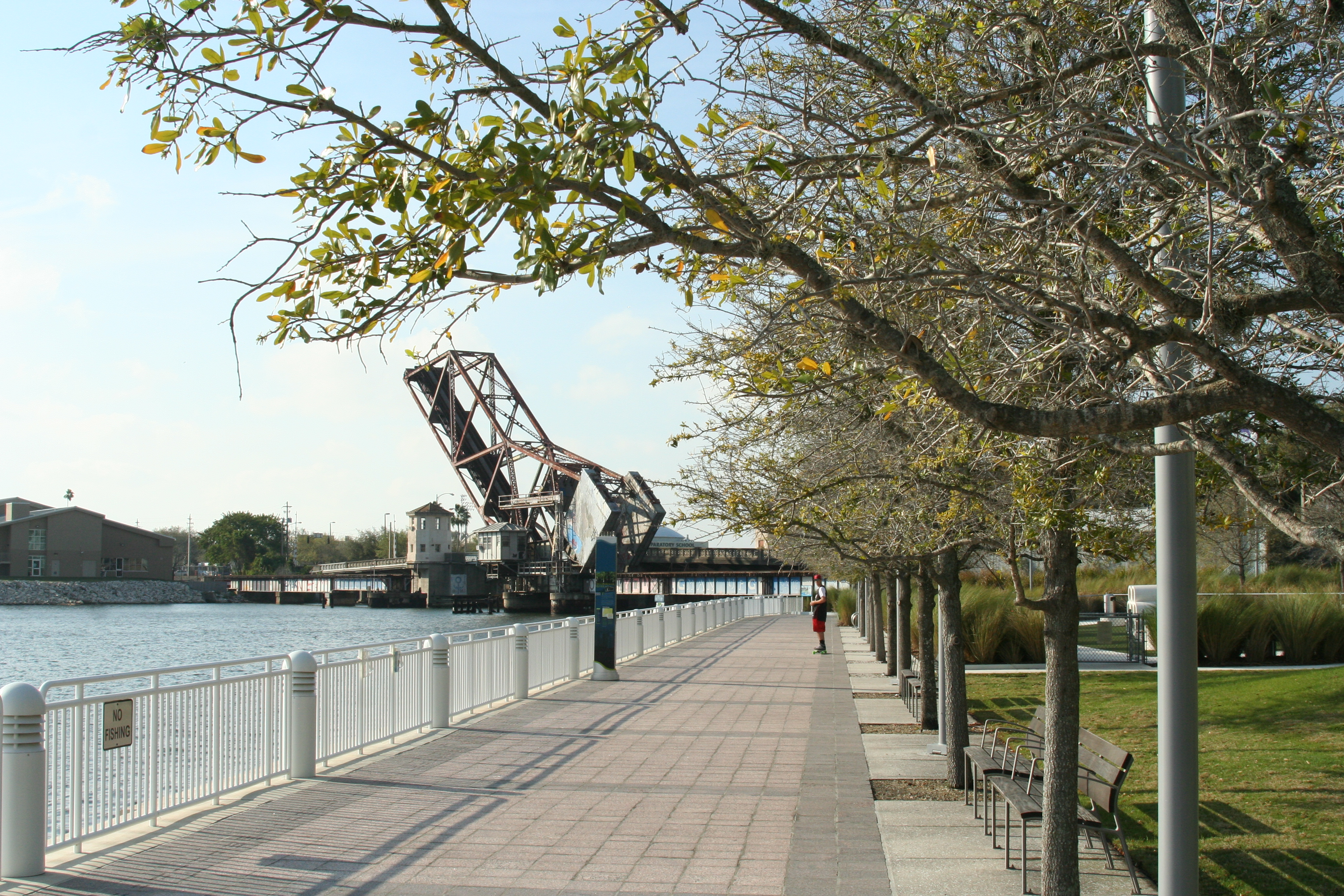
Part of the Tampa Riverwalk

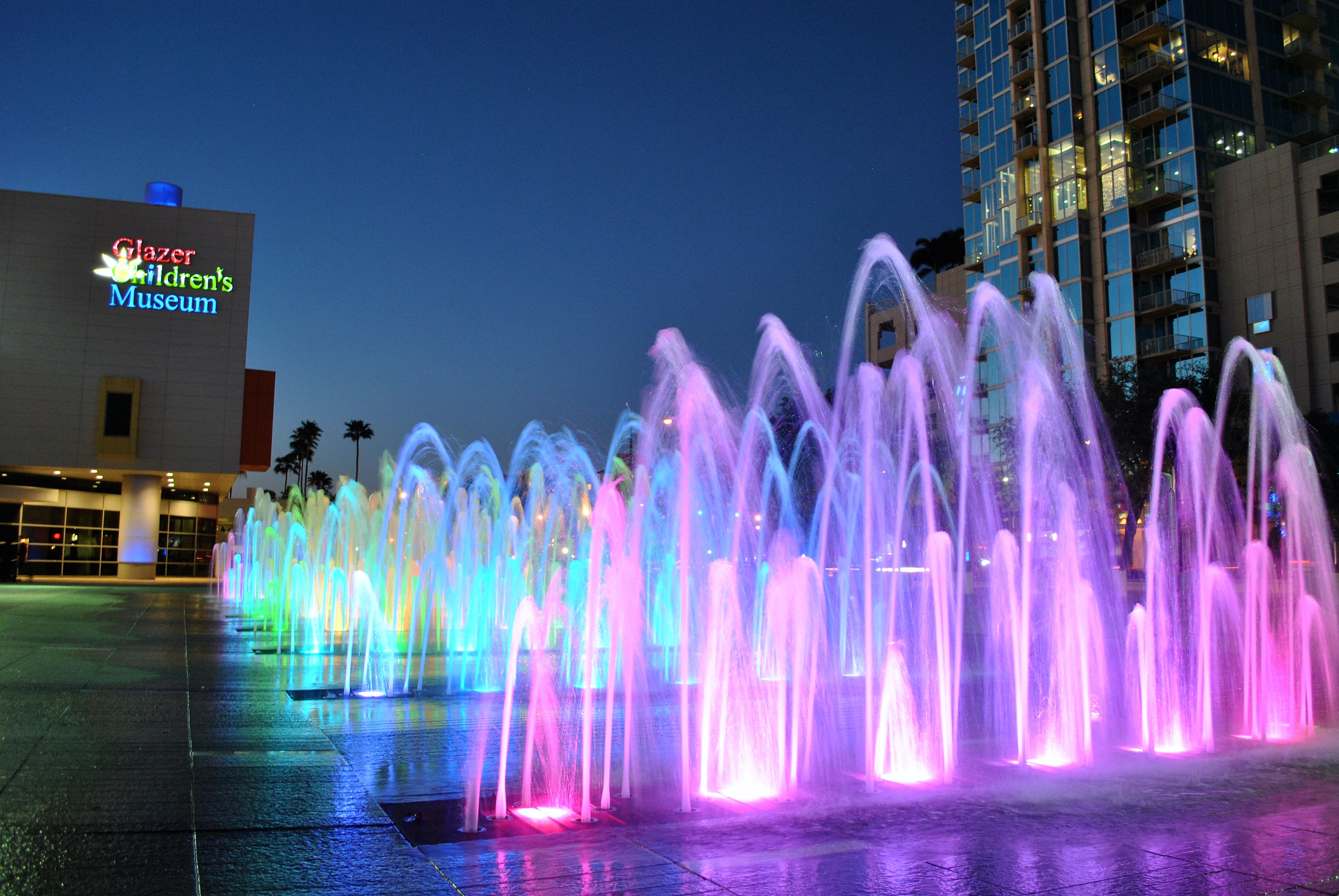
Fountains at Curtis Hixon Waterfront Park

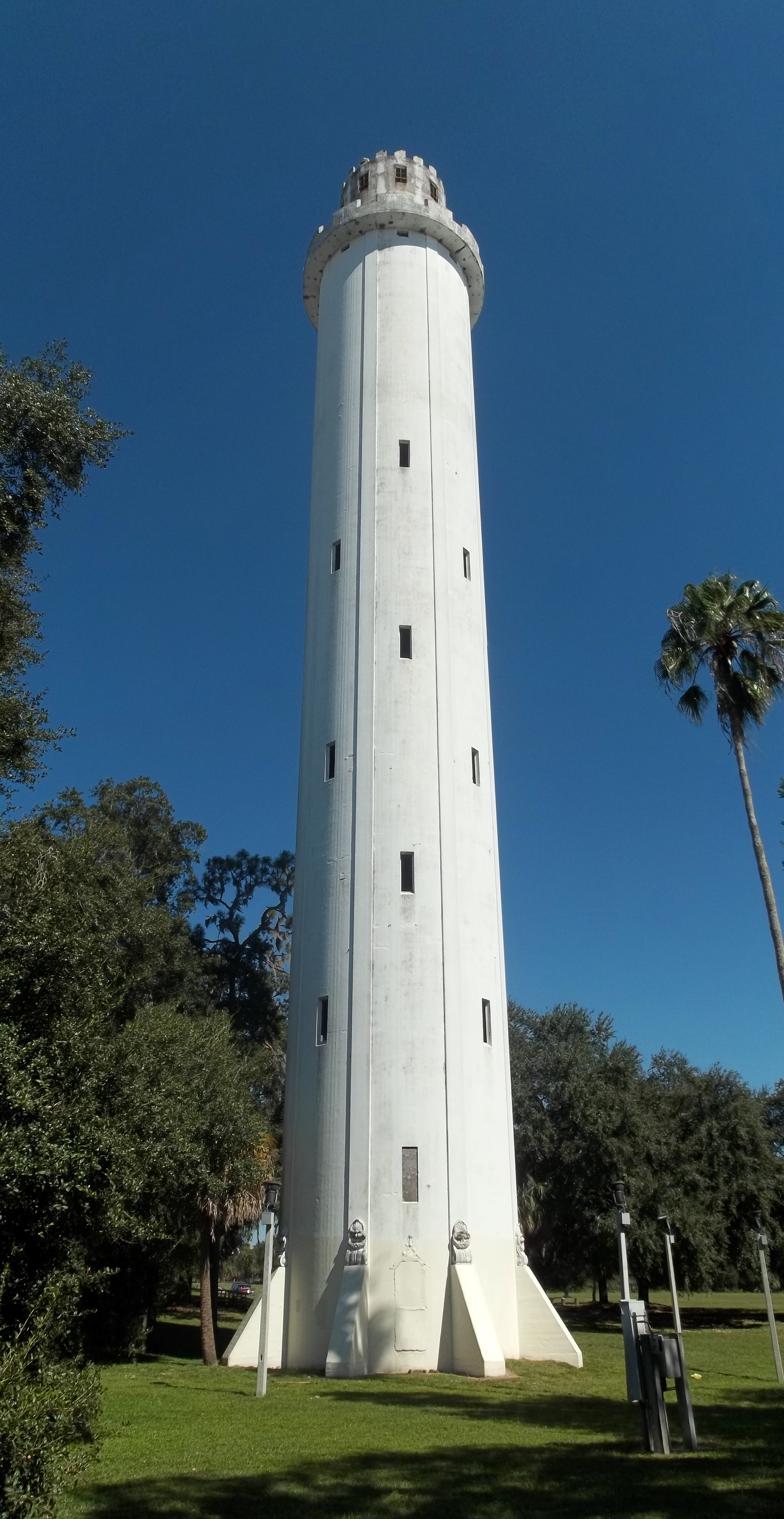
Sulphur Springs Water Tower

The Sulphur Springs Water Tower, a landmark in the Sulphur Springs section of the city, stands 214 feet tall and was built by Grover Poole in the late 1920s. This 1920s boom period for Florida also saw the construction of an ornate movie palace, the Tampa Theatre, a Mediterranean revival on Davis Islands, and Bayshore Boulevard, which borders Hillsborough Bay from downtown Tampa to areas in South Tampa. The road has a six-mile (9.7 km) continuous sidewalk on the eastern end, the longest in the world.

The Ybor City District is home to several buildings on the National Register of Historic Places and has been declared a National Historic Landmark. Notable structures include El Centro Español de Tampa, Centro Asturiano de Tampa and other social clubs built in the early 1900s. Including L'Unione Italiana or the Italian Club, at 1731 East 7th Avenue in Ybor City. The Italian Club mission "is to preserve and honor the culture, traditions and heritage of the Italian Community and to maintain the historical facility as a functioning memorial to the working class immigrants."

Babe Zaharias Golf Course in the Forest Hills area of Tampa has been designated a Historical Landmark by the National Register of Historic Places. It was bought in 1949 by the famous "Babe" Didrikson Zaharias, who had a residence nearby, and closed upon her death. In 1974, the city of Tampa opened the golf course to the public.

The Story of Tampa, a public painting by Lynn Ash, is a four-by-eight-foot (1.2 m × 2.4 m) oil on masonite mural that weaves together many of the notable aspects of Tampa's unique character and identity. It was commissioned in 2003 by the city's Public Art Program and is in the lobby of the Tampa Municipal Office Building.

Park Tower, originally the First Financial Bank of Florida, is the first substantial skyscraper in downtown Tampa. Completed in 1973, it was the tallest skyscraper in Tampa until the completion of One Tampa City Center in 1981. The Rivergate building, a cylindrical structure known as the "Beer Can building", was featured in the movie The Punisher.

Spanning the southern part of Tampa Bay is the massive steel-span Sunshine Skyway Bridge.

Tampa is home to the Bro Bowl, one of the last remaining skateparks built during skateboarding's "Golden Era" in the 1970s. It opened in 1979 and was constructed by Tampa Parks and Recreation in 1978. It was the first public skatepark to be constructed in Florida and the third on the East Coast.

Other Tampa landmarks include the Tampa Riverwalk, which is a 2.6-mile-long (4.2-kilometer) open space and pedestrian trail development along the Hillsborough River, and Curtis Hixon Waterfront Park.

=== Climate ===
The Tampa Bay area has a humid subtropical climate (Köppen: Cfa, close to Cwa). Due to its location on the Florida peninsula on Tampa Bay and the Gulf of Mexico, it shows some characteristics of a tropical climate, with only the January mean temperature preventing it from being classified as such. Tampa has hot and humid summers with frequent thunderstorms and dry and mild winters. Average highs range from 71 to 91 °F (22 to 33 °C) year round, and lows 53 to 77 °F (12 to 25 °C). The city of Tampa is split between two USDA climate zones.

In the 2012 USDA Plant Hardiness Zone Map, Tampa is listed as USDA zone 9b north of Kennedy Boulevard away from the bay and 10a near the shorelines and in the interbay peninsula south of Kennedy Boulevard. Zone 10a is about the northern limit of where coconut palms and royal palms can be grown, although some specimens grow in northern Tampa. Recently, certain palm tree species in the area, along with the rest of the state, have been and continue to be severely affected by a plant disease called Texas phoenix palm decline, which has caused a considerable amount of damage to various local palm tree landscapes and threatens the native palm tree species in the region.

=== Tropical storms ===
Tampa is threatened by tropical systems almost every hurricane season, which runs from June 1 to November 30. Tampa has rarely been directly impacted by major hurricanes throughout much of its recorded history. No hurricane has made landfall in the immediate Tampa Bay area since the 1921 Tampa Bay hurricane made landfall as a category 3 near Tarpon Springs, and caused extensive damage throughout the region.

Over the past few decades, five major hurricanes were forecast to hit the Tampa Bay area from the south-southwest, which is a worst-case track that would result in a maximum storm surge event: Hurricane Donna (1960), Hurricane Charley (2004), Hurricane Irma (2017), Hurricane Ian (2022), and Hurricane Milton (2024). All of these storms veered to the east or northeast before reaching Tampa Bay and instead made landfall down the coast, resulting in serious damage in southwest Florida.

Irma and Milton had the greatest effect on Tampa. Irma made landfall near Marco Island on September 10, 2017, and moved due north, passing through eastern Hillsborough County as a Category 1 storm. Milton made landfall in Siesta Key on October 9, 2024, and moved east-northeast. Both storms caused widespread issues in the area, particularly disrupting the electrical grid for several days. Hurricane Helene struck the Big Bend as a Category 4 storm on September 26, 2024, causing the worst storm surge in the Tampa Bay Area in 100 years.

Because of tremendous population growth and coastal development in the century since the last hurricane landfall, combined with rising sea levels due to climate change, the Tampa Bay Area is considered one of the most vulnerable regions in the world to a direct hit from a major storm.

=== Seasonal trends ===
==== Summer ====
Summertime weather patterns predominate from late May to early October, which is the region's rainy season. Daily weather is very consistent during this period, with daytime highs averaging about 91 °F (33 °C), lows usually in the mid- to upper 70s °F (23–25 °C), high humidity, and a regular chance of rain, especially in the afternoon. Mainly due to the proximity of large bodies of water, the official high temperature had never hit 100 °F (37.8 °C) until July 27, 2025.

Afternoon thunderstorms are regularly generated by the interaction of the Gulf and Atlantic sea breezes and are such a regular occurrence during the summer that the Tampa Bay area and nearby inland areas of Central Florida are recognized as the "Lightning Capital of North America". Afternoon thundershowers occasionally intensify into a severe thunderstorm, bringing heavy downpours, frequent lightning, strong straight-line winds, and sometimes hail.

==== Autumn ====
Temperatures gradually fall in September, and average daily rainfall amounts decrease as autumn progresses. November is usually Tampa's driest month. Rain totals in the fall can be augmented by passing tropical systems, which can dump several inches of rain.

==== Winter ====
Winter in the area is generally dry and cooler. Average high temperatures range from the low to mid-70s °F (21–23 °C) during the day to the low to mid-50s °F (11–13 °C) at night. Occasional cold fronts push through the area during the season, usually bringing a brief period of rain followed by daytime highs in the 50s °F (10–13 °C) and nighttime lows near 40 °F (4 °C) for a day or two. Tampa experiences occasional frosts, with an annual mean minimum temperature of 32.8 °F (0.4 °C)

Since the Tampa area is home to a diverse range of freeze-sensitive agriculture and aquaculture, hard freezes, although quite rare, are a major concern. Hard freezes, defined as a temperature of 28 °F (−2.2 °C) or below for several hours, occur rarely in the Tampa area, every five to twenty years depending on the exact location. The last widespread freeze occurred on the morning of January 18, 2018, when the temperature at Tampa International Airport dropped to 29 °F (−2 °C). The lowest temperature ever recorded in Tampa was 18 °F (−8 °C) on December 13, 1962. The only snowfall officially recorded in Tampa occurred on January 19, 1977, with local accumulations ranging between a trace and 0.2 in (0.5 cm).

==== Spring ====
Tampa has a slow increase in average temperatures beginning in mid-February. Spring brings mostly warm and sunny weather to the area. While temperatures in late spring approach summertime values, the rainy season does not usually begin until June, leading to the threat of brush fires from approximately late March until May. Occasionally, a late-season cold front pushes through the area, potentially bringing a brief round of severe weather, followed by a few days of unseasonably cool temperatures.

==== Monthly averages ====
Climate data for Tampa, Florida (Tampa Int'l), 1991−2020 normals, (Note: Mean monthly maxima and minima (i.e. the highest and lowest temperature readings during an entire month or year) calculated based on data at said location from 1991 to 2020.) extremes 1890−present (Note: Official records for Tampa were kept at downtown from April 1890 to December 1940, Peter O. Knight Airport from January 1941 to 5 June 1946, and at Tampa Int'l since 7 June 1946. For more information, see ThreadEx)
Month	Jan	Feb	Mar	Apr	May	Jun	Jul	Aug	Sep	Oct	Nov	Dec	Year
Record high °F (°C)	86 (30)	89 (32)	92 (33)	96 (36)	98 (37)	99 (37)	100 (38)	98 (37)	96 (36)	95 (35)	92 (33)	86 (30)	100 (38)
Mean maximum °F (°C)	81.8 (27.7)	82.5 (28.1)	85.4 (29.7)	89.0 (31.7)	93.4 (34.1)	95.0 (35.0)	94.8 (34.9)	94.8 (34.9)	93.8 (34.3)	91.1 (32.8)	86.4 (30.2)	82.5 (28.1)	96.2 (35.7)
Mean daily maximum °F (°C)	71.3 (21.8)	74.0 (23.3)	77.8 (25.4)	83.0 (28.3)	88.3 (31.3)	90.5 (32.5)	91.0 (32.8)	91.2 (32.9)	90.2 (32.3)	85.6 (29.8)	78.9 (26.1)	73.9 (23.3)	83.0 (28.3)
Daily mean °F (°C)	62.0 (16.7)	64.7 (18.2)	68.6 (20.3)	73.9 (23.3)	79.5 (26.4)	82.9 (28.3)	83.8 (28.8)	84.0 (28.9)	82.7 (28.2)	77.4 (25.2)	69.8 (21.0)	64.9 (18.3)	74.5 (23.6)
Mean daily minimum °F (°C)	52.8 (11.6)	55.5 (13.1)	59.3 (15.2)	64.8 (18.2)	70.6 (21.4)	75.4 (24.1)	76.6 (24.8)	76.8 (24.9)	75.3 (24.1)	69.2 (20.7)	60.7 (15.9)	55.9 (13.3)	66.1 (18.9)
Mean minimum °F (°C)	34.4 (1.3)	38.8 (3.8)	43.4 (6.3)	51.6 (10.9)	61.2 (16.2)	69.9 (21.1)	71.8 (22.1)	72.5 (22.5)	69.2 (20.7)	54.9 (12.7)	45.3 (7.4)	39.5 (4.2)	32.8 (0.4)
Record low °F (°C)	21 (−6)	22 (−6)	29 (−2)	38 (3)	49 (9)	53 (12)	63 (17)	66 (19)	54 (12)	40 (4)	23 (−5)	18 (−8)	18 (−8)
Average precipitation inches (mm)	2.65 (67)	2.62 (67)	2.52 (64)	2.55 (65)	2.60 (66)	7.37 (187)	7.75 (197)	9.03 (229)	6.09 (155)	2.34 (59)	1.40 (36)	2.56 (65)	49.48 (1,257)
Average precipitation days (≥ 0.01 in)	7.1	6.6	5.9	5.7	6.2	13.3	16.6	16.2	12.8	7.2	4.6	6.0	108.2
Average relative humidity (%)	74.9	73.0	71.8	69.0	69.8	74.4	76.6	78.4	77.6	74.2	75.0	75.0	74.1
Average dew point °F (°C)	50.2 (10.1)	50.7 (10.4)	55.6 (13.1)	59.2 (15.1)	64.9 (18.3)	70.9 (21.6)	72.7 (22.6)	73.0 (22.8)	71.2 (21.8)	64.2 (17.9)	57.7 (14.3)	52.3 (11.3)	61.9 (16.6)
Mean monthly sunshine hours	213.9	231.7	260.4	279.0	337.9	321.0	334.8	294.5	267.0	235.6	195.0	195.3	3,166.1
Mean daily sunshine hours	6.9	8.2	8.4	9.3	10.9	10.7	10.8	9.5	8.9	7.6	6.5	6.3	8.7
Mean daily daylight hours	10.6	11.2	12.0	12.9	13.5	13.9	13.7	13.1	12.3	11.5	10.8	10.4	12.2
Percentage possible sunshine	65	73	70	72	81	77	79	73	72	66	60	61	71
Average ultraviolet index	4.4	6.1	8.0	9.6	10.1	10.4	10.5	10.1	8.7	6.7	4.8	4.0	7.7
Source 1: NOAA (relative humidity, dew point and sun 1961−1990)
Source 2: UV Index Today (1995–2022) Source 3: Weather Atlas (sunshine data)

== Demographics ==
Historical population
Census	Pop.	Note	%±
1850	974		—
1870	796		—
1880	720		−9.5%
1890	5,532		668.3%
1900	15,839		186.3%
1910	37,782		138.5%
1920	51,608		36.6%
1930	101,161		96.0%
1940	108,391		7.1%
1950	124,681		15.0%
1960	274,970		120.5%
1970	277,714		1.0%
1980	271,523		−2.2%
1990	280,015		3.1%
2000	303,447		8.4%
2010	335,709		10.6%
2020	384,959		14.7%
2025 (est.)	413,554	▲	7.4%
source: (Note: 1850 census population include soldiers stationed at Fort Brooke.) (Note: Not returned separately by enumerators in 1860.)

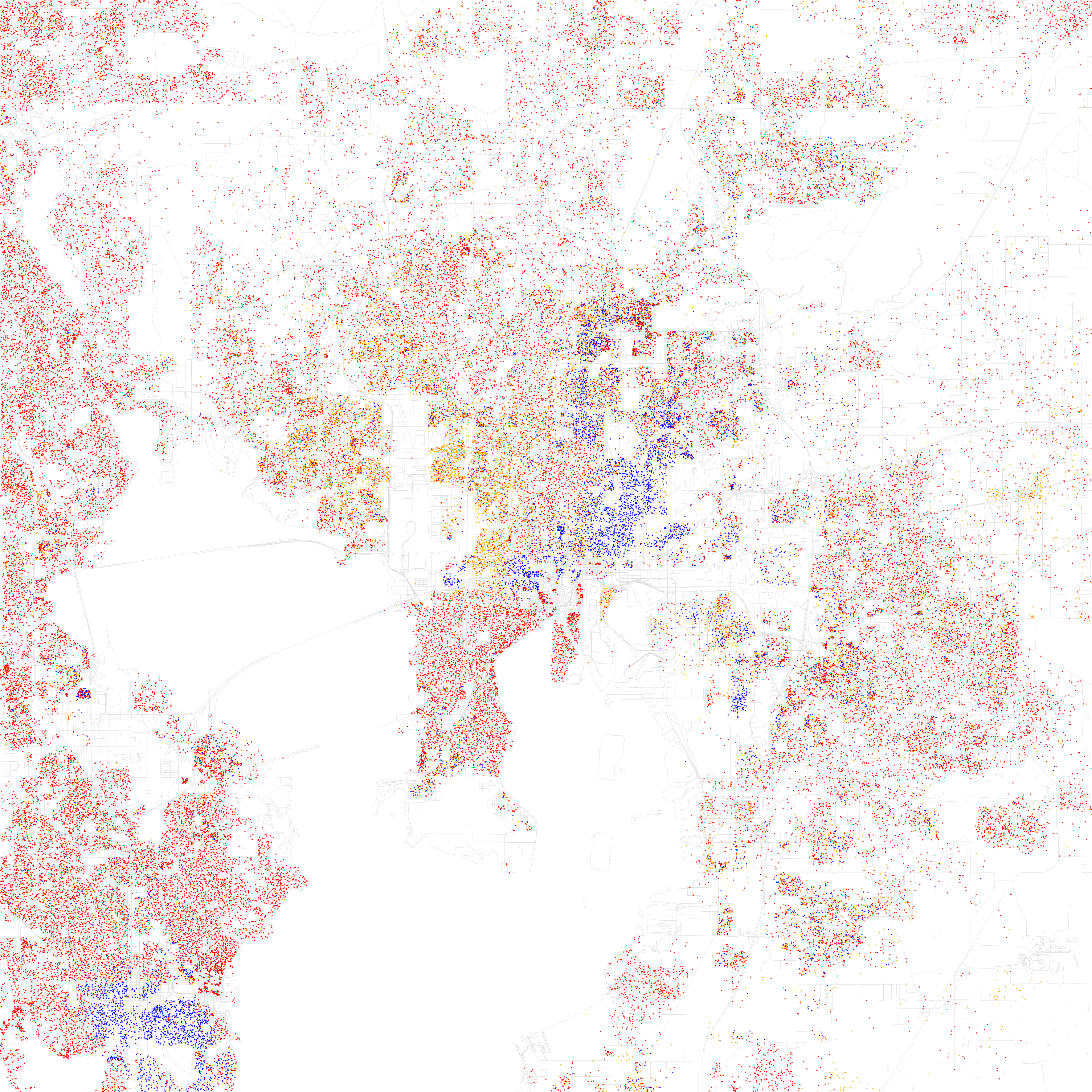
A racial distribution map of Tampa, 2010 U.S. Census. Each dot is 25 people: ⬤ White ⬤ Black ⬤ Asian ⬤ Hispanic ⬤ Other

Tampa first appeared in the 1850 U.S. Census with a total recorded population of 974, which included soldiers stationed at Fort Brooke. Tampa did not report separately in 1860.

In 2000, those who spoke only English at home accounted for 77.4% of all residents, while 22.6% spoke other languages in their homes. Spanish speakers were 17.8% of the population. Both French and Italian were each spoken by 0.6% of the population.

=== Racial and ethnic composition ===
Tampa city, Florida – Racial and ethnic composition Note: the US Census treats Hispanic/Latino as an ethnic category. This table excludes Latinos from the racial categories and assigns them to a separate category. Hispanics/Latinos may be of any race.
Race / Ethnicity (NH = Non-Hispanic)	Pop 2000	Pop 2010	Pop 2020	% 2000	% 2010	% 2020
White alone (NH)	154,872	155,552	166,775	51.04%	46.34%	43.32%
Black or African American alone (NH)	76,711	83,032	80,583	25.28%	24.73%	20.93%
Native American or Alaska Native alone (NH)	829	755	741	0.27%	0.22%	0.19%
Asian alone (NH)	6,443	11,362	20,587	2.12%	3.38%	5.35%
Native Hawaiian or Pacific Islander alone (NH)	241	207	246	0.08%	0.06%	0.06%
Other race alone (NH)	618	794	2,746	0.20%	0.24%	0.71%
Mixed race or Multiracial (NH)	5,211	6,535	14,660	1.72%	1.95%	3.81%
Hispanic or Latino (any race)	58,522	77,472	98,621	19.29%	23.08%	25.62%
Total	303,447	335,709	384,959	100.00%	100.00%	100.00%

=== 2020 census ===
In the 2020 United States census, there were 384,959 people, 156,705 households, and 85,195 families living in Tampa.

The U.S. Census accounts for race by two methodologies: "Race alone" where Hispanics are allocated to the various racial categories and "Race alone less Hispanics" where Hispanics are excluded from the racial categories and delineated separately as if a separate race.

In the 2020 U.S. census, the racial makeup, including Hispanics in the racial counts, was 49.70% (191,309) White alone, 21.91% (84,340) Black alone, 0.41% (1,563) Native American alone, 5.43% (20,895) Asian alone, 0.08% (308) Pacific Islander alone, 7.63% (29,385) Other Race alone, and 14.85% (57,159) Multiracial or Mixed Race.

In the 2020 U.S. census, the racial and ethnic makeup, where Hispanics are excluded from the racial counts and placed in their own category, was 43.32% (166,775) White alone (non-Hispanic), 20.93% (80,583) Black alone (non-Hispanic), 0.19% (741) Native American alone (non-Hispanic), 5.35% (20,587) Asian alone (non-Hispanic), 0.06% (246) Pacific Islander alone (non-Hispanic), 0.71% (2,746) Other Race alone (non-Hispanic), 3.81% (14,660) Multiracial or Mixed Race (non-Hispanic), and 25.62% (98,621) Hispanic or Latino.

=== 2010 census ===
In the 2010 United States census, there were 335,709 people, 133,277 households, and 75,562 families living in Tampa.

=== Religion ===
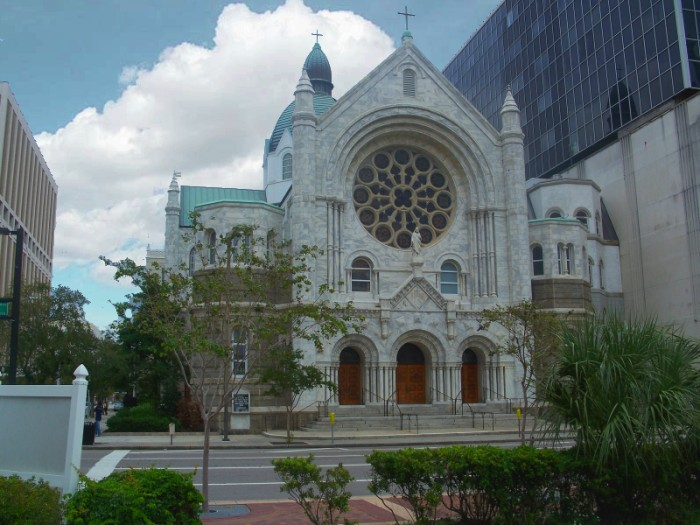
Sacred Heart Church

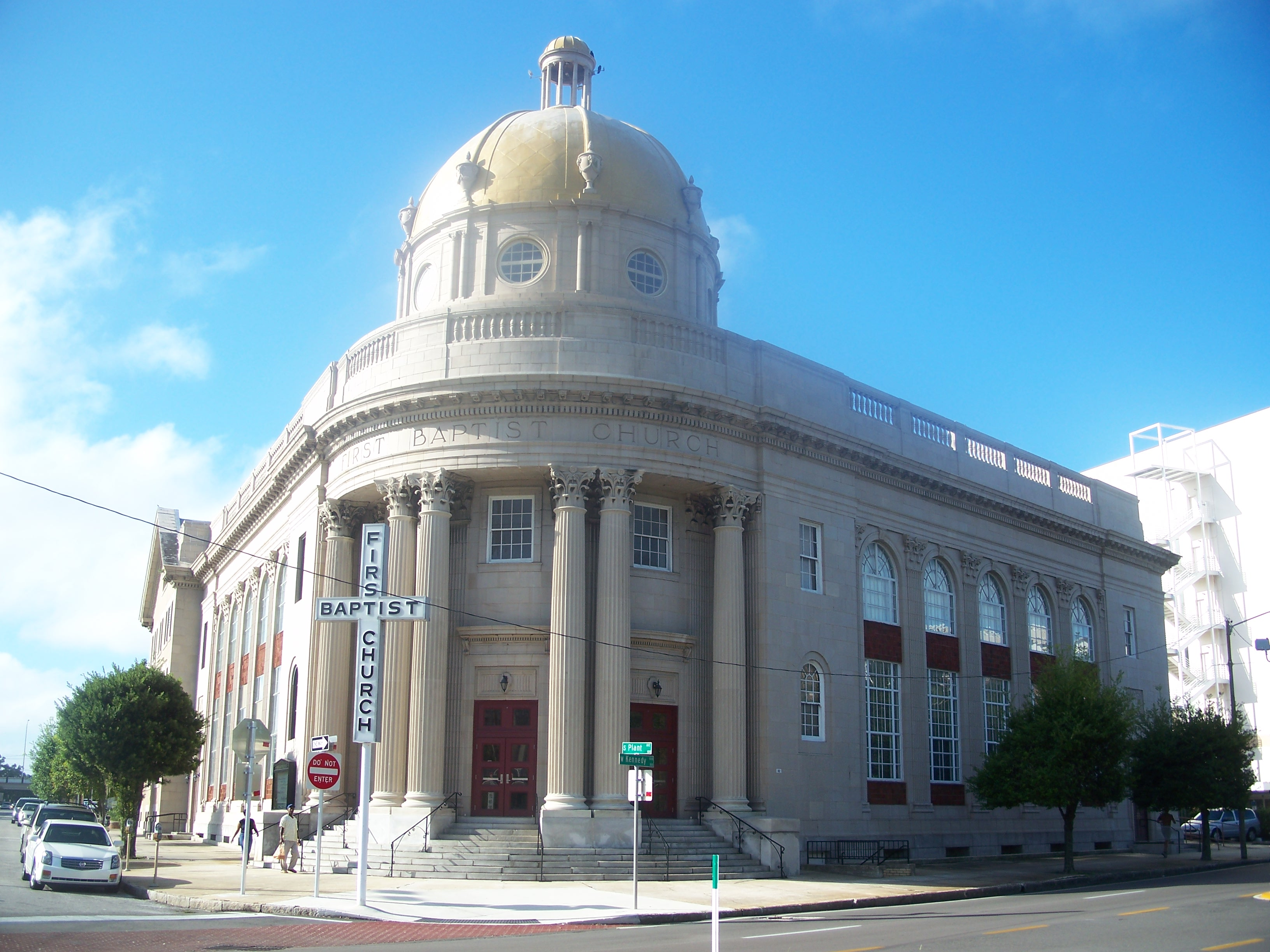
First Baptist Church of Tampa, organized 1859

Communities of faith have organized in Tampa from 1846, when a Methodist congregation established the city's first church, to 1939, when a 21-year-old Billy Graham began his career as a spiritual evangelist and preacher on downtown's Franklin Street. Among Tampa's noteworthy religious structures are Sacred Heart Catholic Church, a 1905 downtown landmark noted for its soaring, Romanesque revival construction in granite and marble with German-crafted stained glass windows, the distinctive rock and mortar St. James Episcopal House of Prayer, listed with the National Register of Historic Places, and the St. Paul AME church, which has seen the likes of Dr. Martin Luther King Jr. and President Bill Clinton speak from its pulpit. The latter two have been designated by the city government as Local Landmark Structures.

Tampa's religious community includes a broad representation of Christian denominations, including those above, and Baptist, Presbyterian, Lutheran, Christian Science, Church of God, United Church of Christ, Philippine Independent Church, Metropolitan Community Church, Seventh-day Adventist, Eastern Orthodox (Greek, Coptic, Syrian, and OCA), various Pentecostal movements, Anglicans, the Quakers, Jehovah's Witnesses, and the Church of Jesus Christ of Latter-day Saints. There is also at least one congregation of Messianic Jews in Tampa.

There is a Korean Baptist church, a Mennonite church, several Haitian churches, and a Vietnamese Baptist Church. Tampa has several Jewish synagogues practicing Orthodox, Conservative, and Reform. There is a small Zoroastrian community present in Tampa. as well as several Unitarian Universalist congregations

Around the city are a handful of mosques for followers of Islam, as well as a Tibetan-style Buddhist temple, a Thai Buddhist Wat, and local worship centers for the Sikh, Hindu and Baháʼí Faiths. The Church of Scientology, based in nearby Clearwater, maintains a location for its members in Tampa.

In 2012, Tampa was 50th out of the largest 51 metropolitan areas in the percentage of the populace that attends religious services of any kind, with less than 35% of the population regularly attending services. Only the Portland, Oregon area is less observant.

== Economy ==
The Tampa metropolitan area's economy includes major industries such as finance, healthcare, insurance, technology, cybersecurity, professional and business services, logistics, maritime and air transportation, national defense, professional sports, tourism, construction and real estate. The U.S. Bureau of Labor statistics reports the Tampa-St. Petersburg-Clearwater metro area has approximately 1.56 million jobs in 2026.

Since the year 2000, Tampa has seen a notable upsurge in high-market demand from consumers, signaling more wealth concentrated in the area. In 2021, the U.S. Department of Labor awarded a two-year grant of nearly US$3 million to a program called "Connecting Talent to Careers" led by the Advanced Robotics for Manufacturing Institute and Tooling U-SME to deliver a rapid re-employment program to address a shortage of skilled labor in manufacturing in the region exposed by the COVID-19 pandemic.

In March 2026, the Florida Senate passed Resolution 1816, recognizing the Tampa Bay area as CyberBay. This officially designated the region as a hub for cybersecurity and artificial intelligence innovation.

=== Corporations and nonprofits ===
Several large corporations, such as banks and telecommunications companies, maintain regional offices in Tampa. The largest credit union in Florida, Suncoast Credit Union, is headquartered in Tampa.

Several Fortune 1000 companies are headquartered in the metropolitan area, including Bloomin' Brands, WellCare, Jabil, TECO Energy, and Raymond James Financial. Other companies headquartered in Tampa include Odyssey Marine Exploration, Greenway Health, College Hunks Hauling Junk, Arturo Fuente, J.C. Newman Cigar Company, Masonite International, Sykes Enterprises, Cott Corporation, Blue Rock Partners, The Melting Pot, Checkers and Rally's, Benzer Pharmacy and The Mosaic Company.

Largest employers in Tampa (2013)
Employer	Employees	Industry
BayCare Health System	19,600	Healthcare
Publix Super Market	13,800	Retail
HCA West Florida	13,150	Healthcare
Frontier Communications	9,950	Telecommunications
Tampa General Hospital	6,600	Healthcare
Wal-Mart	5,800	Retail
Florida Hospital	5,100	Healthcare
JPMorgan Chase & Co.	5,000	Finance
Moffitt Cancer Center	4,300	Healthcare
Citi	4,000	Finance

=== Downtown ===
Downtown Tampa is undergoing significant development and redevelopment in line with a general national trend toward urban residential development. In April 2007, the Tampa Downtown Partnership noted development proceeding on 20 residential, hotel, and mixed-use projects. Many of the new downtown developments were nearing completion in the midst of a housing market slump, which caused numerous projects to be delayed or revamped, and some of the 20 projects TDP lists have not broken ground and are being refinanced. Several developments were completed, making downtown into a 24-hour neighborhood instead of a 9 to 5 business district.

As of 2010, Tampa residents faced a decline in rent of 2%. Nationally rent had decreased 4%. The Tampa Business Journal found Tampa to be the number two city for real estate investment in 2014.

=== Port Tampa Bay ===
Port Tampa Bay is the seventh largest in the nation and Florida's largest tonnage port, handling nearly half of all seaborne commerce that passes through the state. Tampa ranks second in the state behind Miami in terms of cruise ship travel. Besides smaller regional cruise ships such as Yacht Starship and SunCruz Casino, Tampa serves as a port of call for three cruise lines: Holland America's MS Ryndam, Royal Caribbean's Grandeur of the Seas and Radiance of the Seas, and Carnival's Inspiration and Legend.

=== MacDill Air Force Base ===
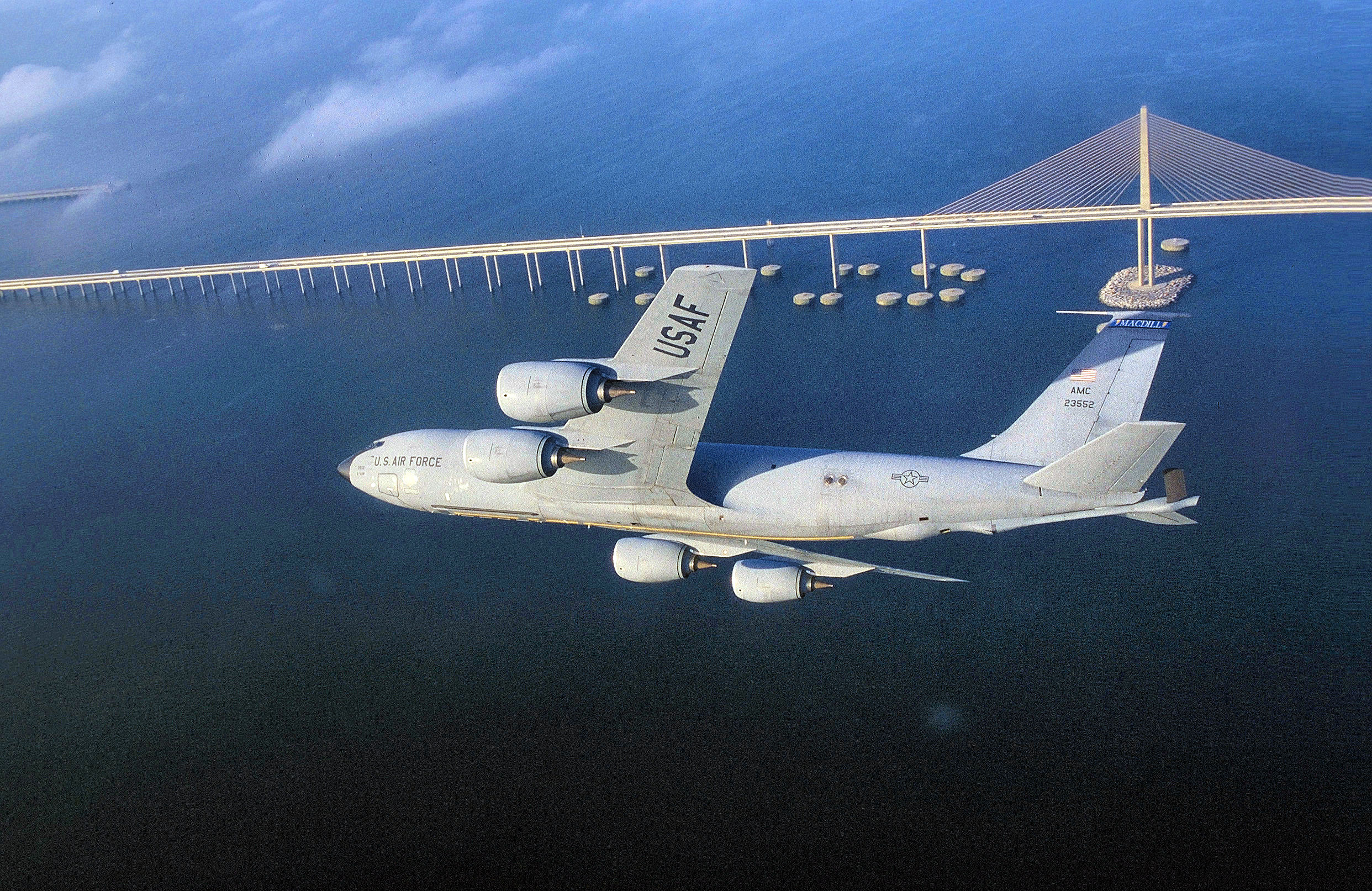
A KC-135R stationed at MacDill flying over Tampa Bay

Tampa hosts the headquarters of United States Central Command at MacDill Air Force Base, described as the most important military HQ after the Pentagon. MacDill remains a major employer as the parent installation for over 15,000 active uniformed military, Department of Defense (DoD) civil service and DoD contractor personnel in the Tampa Bay area. A significant majority of the civil service and contractor personnel are, in fact, themselves retired career military personnel.

In addition to the 6th Air Mobility Wing, which is "host wing" for the base, MacDill is also home to Headquarters, United States Special Operations Command (USSOCOM), the 927th Air Refueling Wing, Headquarters, United States Marine Forces Central Command (USMARCENT), Headquarters, United States Special Operations Command Central (USSOCCENT), and numerous other military activities of the active and reserve components of the armed forces.

== Arts and culture ==
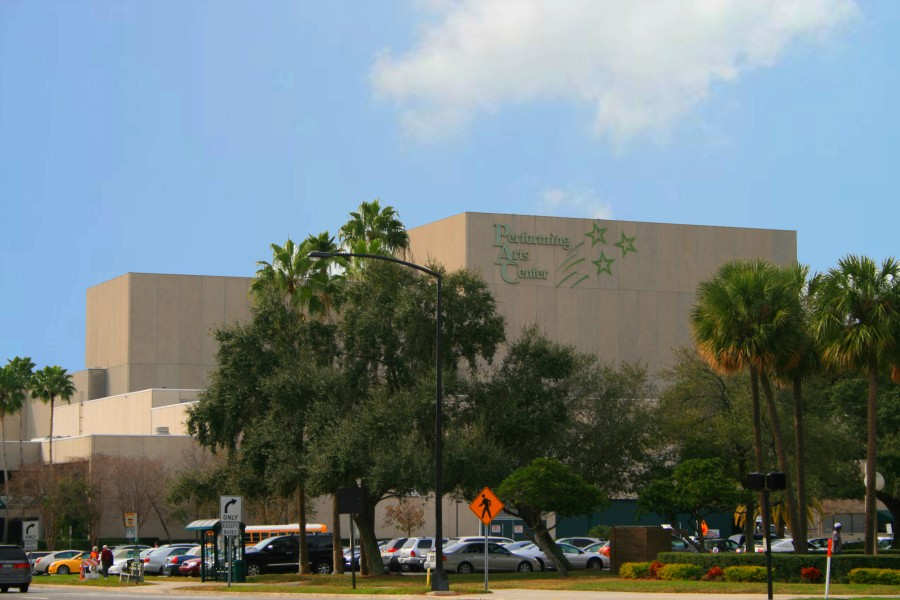
The Straz Center for the Performing Arts

=== Arts and entertainment ===
Tampa is home to a variety of stage and performing arts venues and theaters, including the David A. Straz Jr. Center for the Performing Arts, Tampa Theatre, Gorilla Theatre, and the MidFlorida Credit Union Amphitheatre next to the Florida State Fairgrounds.

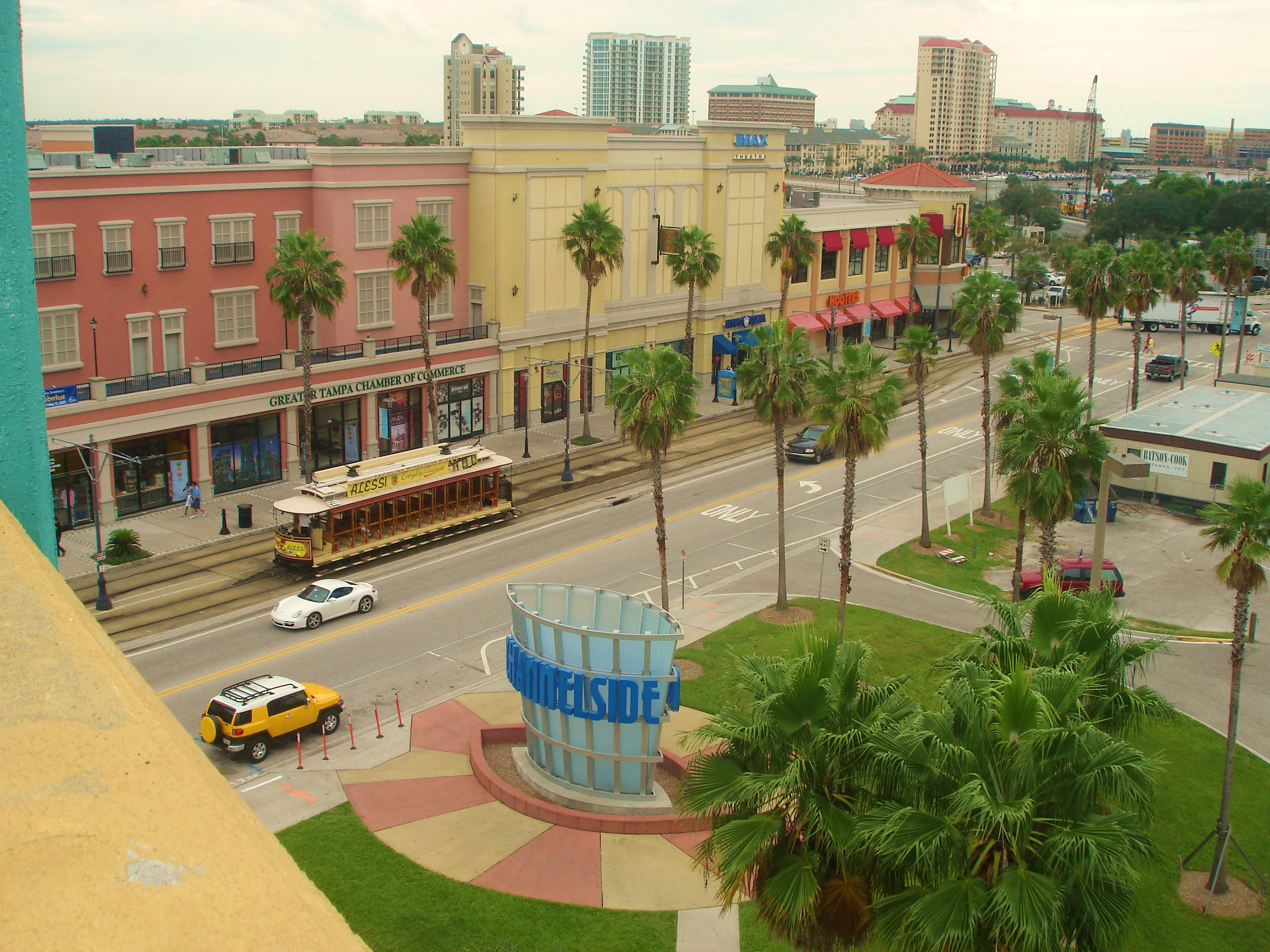
Tampa's Channel District

Performing arts companies and organizations which call Tampa home include the Florida Orchestra, Opera Tampa, Jobsite Theater, the Master Chorale of Tampa Bay, the Heralds of Harmony, Stageworks Theatre, Spanish Lyric Theater, Tampa Bay Opera, and the Tampa Bay Symphony.

Current popular nightlife districts include Channelside, Ybor City, SoHo, International Plaza and Bay Street, and Seminole Hard Rock. Downtown Tampa also contains some nightlife, and there are more clubs/bars to be found in other areas of the city. Tampa is rated sixth on Maxim magazine's list of top party cities.

The area has become a "de facto" headquarters of professional wrestling, with many pros living and training in the area. WWE's former developmental territory, Florida Championship Wrestling, was also based in Tampa.

Tampa is home to several death metal bands, an extreme form of heavy metal music that evolved from thrash metal in the mid-late 1980s. Many of the genre's pioneers and foremost figures are based in and around the city. Chief among these are Deicide, Obituary, Death, Morbid Angel, Six Feet Under and Cannibal Corpse, with the latter originally being from Buffalo, New York. The Tampa scene grew with the birth of Morrisound Recording, which established itself as an international recording destination for metal bands.

The rock band Underoath is based in Tampa.

In 2009, the new Frank Wildhorn musical Wonderland: Alice's New Musical Adventure hosted its world premiere at the Straz Center.

=== Museums ===
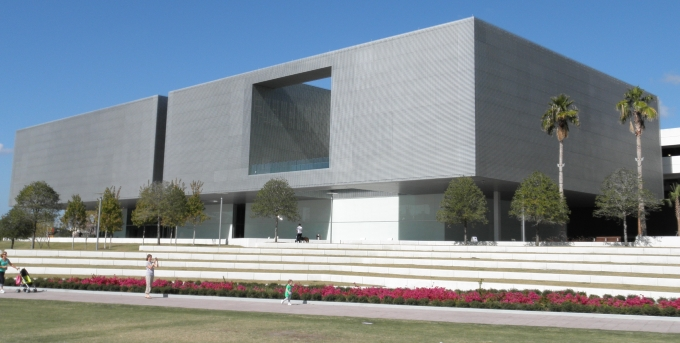
Tampa Museum of Art

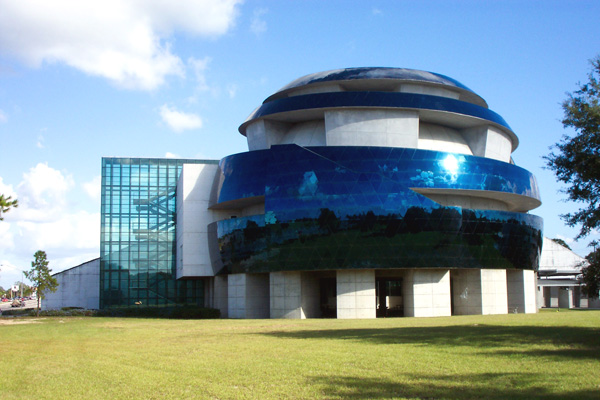
The Museum of Science and Industry

The Tampa area is home to a number of museums that cover a wide array of subjects and studies. These include the Museum of Science & Industry (MOSI), which has several floors of science-related exhibits plus the only domed IMAX theater in Florida and a planetarium; the Tampa Museum of Art; the USF Contemporary Art Museum; the Tampa Bay History Center; the Tampa Firefighters Museum; the Glazer Children's Museum; the Henry B. Plant Museum; and Ybor City Museum State Park. Permanently docked in downtown's Channel District is the SS American Victory, a former World War II Victory ship which is now used as a museum ship. Florida Museum of Photographic Arts features local and international photography exhibitions.

=== Cuisine ===
Tampa has a diverse culinary scene from small cafes and bakeries to bistros and farm-to-table restaurants. The food of Tampa has a history of Cuban, Spanish, Floribbean and Italian cuisines. There are also many Colombian, Puerto Rican, Vietnamese and barbecue restaurants. Seafood is very popular in Tampa, and Greek cuisine is prominent in the area, including around Tarpon Springs. Food trucks are popular, and the area holds the record for the world's largest food truck rally. In addition to Ybor, the areas of Seminole Heights and South Tampa are known for their restaurants.

Tampa is the birthplace of the Florida version of the deviled crab and the Cuban sandwich, which has been officially designated as the "signature sandwich of the city of Tampa" by the city council. A Tampa Cuban sandwich is distinct from other regional versions, as Genoa salami is layered in with the other ingredients, likely due to the influence of Italian immigrants living next to Cubans and Spaniards in Ybor City.

Several restaurant chains were founded or headquartered in Tampa, including Outback Steakhouse, The Melting Pot, Front Burner Brands, Carrabba's, Fleming's Prime Steakhouse & Wine Bar, Bonefish Grill, Columbia Restaurant, Checkers and Rally's, Taco Bus, and PDQ.

=== Tourism and recreation ===
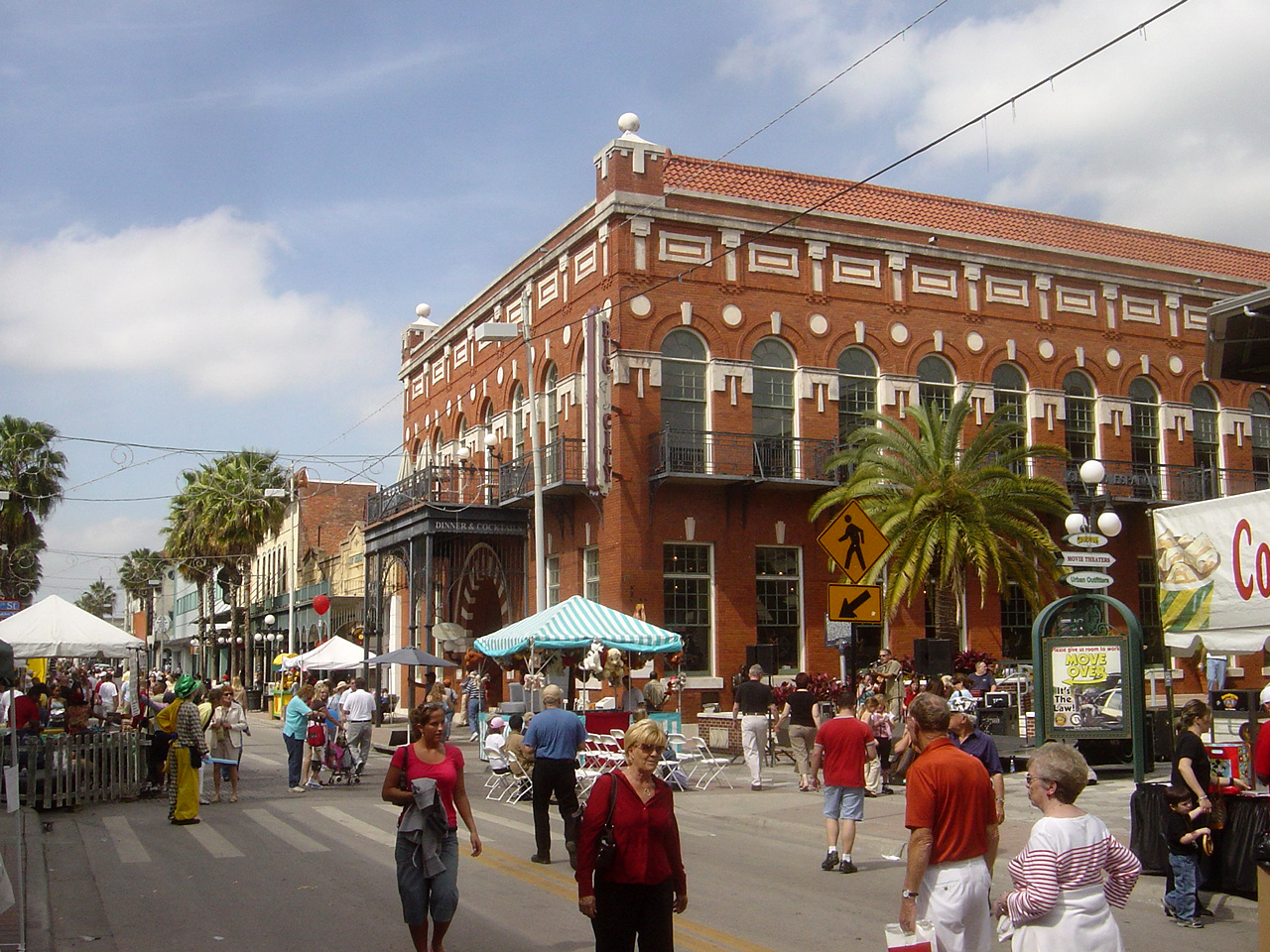
A street festival on Ybor City's famous 7th Avenue in front of the historic El Centro Español de Tampa

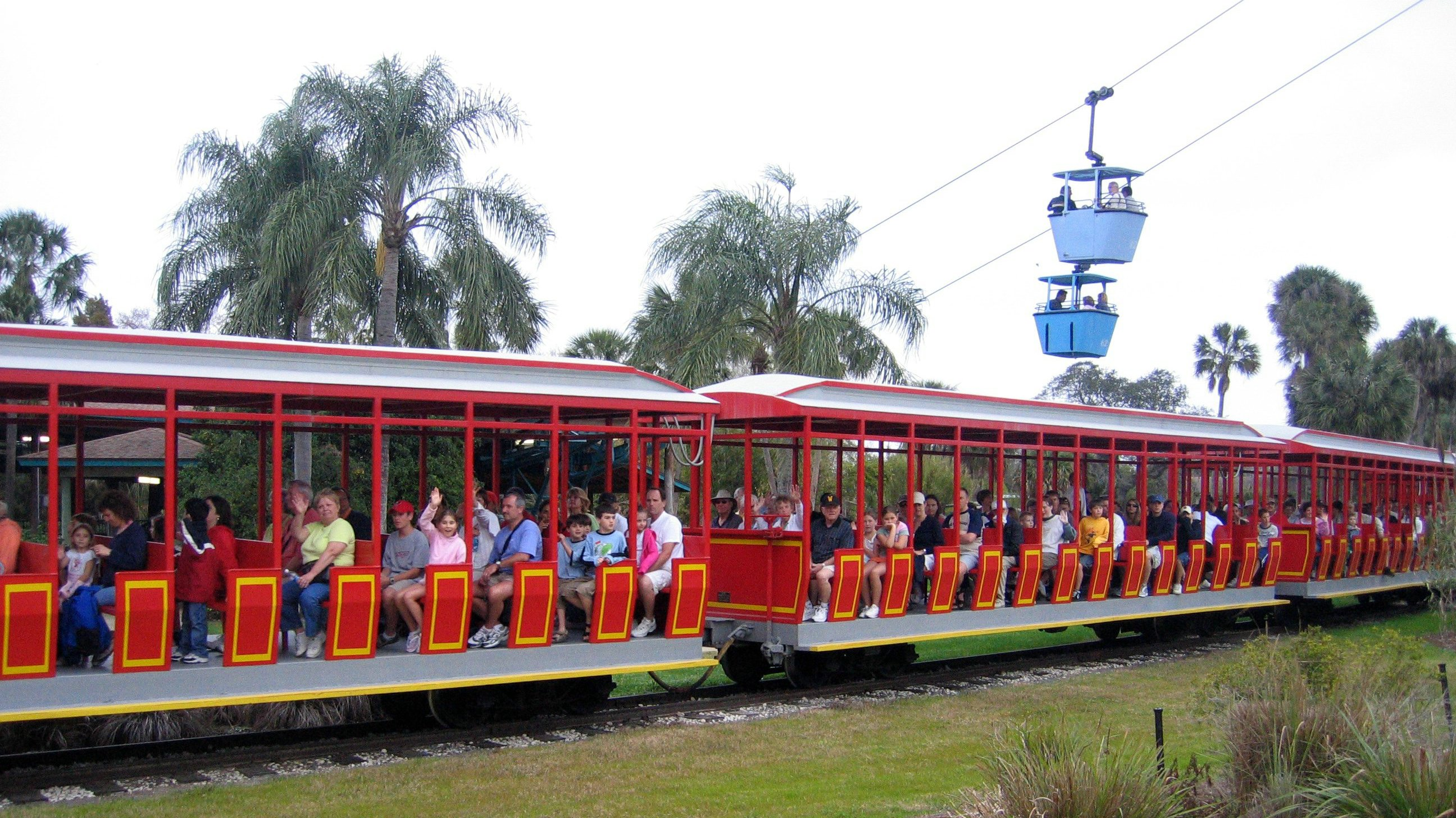
Visitors riding the Serengeti Express and Skyride at Busch Gardens Tampa Bay

The city of Tampa operates over 165 parks and beaches covering 2,286 acres (9.25 km^{2}) within city limits; 42 more in surrounding suburbs covering 70,000 acres (280 km^{2}) are maintained by Hillsborough County. These areas include Hillsborough River State Park, just northeast of the city. Tampa is home to a number of attractions and theme parks, including Busch Gardens Tampa Bay, Adventure Island, ZooTampa at Lowry Park, and the Florida Aquarium.

ZooTampa at Lowry Park features over 2,000 animals, interactive exhibits, rides, educational shows and more. The zoo serves as an economic, cultural, environmental and educational anchor in Tampa.

Big Cat Rescue is one of the largest accredited sanctuaries in the world dedicated entirely to abused and abandoned big cats. It is home to about 80 lions, tigers, bobcats, cougars and other species, most of whom have been abandoned, abused, orphaned, saved from being turned into fur coats, or retired from performing acts. They have a variety of different tours available.

Busch Gardens Tampa Bay is a 335-acre (1.36 km^{2}) Africa-themed amusement park near the University of South Florida. It features many thrilling roller coasters, for which it is known, including Sheikra, Montu, Cheetah Hunt and Kumba. Visitors can also view and interact with a number of African wildlife. Adventure Island is a 30-acre (12 ha) water park adjacent to Busch Gardens.

The Florida Aquarium is a 250,000 sq ft (23,000 m^{2}) aquarium in the Channel District. It hosts over 20,000 species of aquatic plants and animals. It is known for its unique glass architecture. Adjacent to the aquarium is the SS American Victory, a World War II Victory ship preserved as a museum ship.

The Tampa Bay History Center is a museum in the Channel District. It boasts over 60,000 sq ft (5,600 m^{2}) of exhibits through 12,000 years. There are theaters, a map gallery, a research center and a museum store.

Well-known shopping areas include International Plaza and Bay Street, WestShore Plaza, the SoHo district, and Hyde Park Village. Palma Ceia is home to the Palma Ceia Design District. Previously, Tampa had been home to the Floriland Mall (now an office park), Tampa Bay Center (demolished and replaced with the new Tampa Bay Buccaneers training facility, known as "One Buc Place"), and East Lake Square Mall (now an office park).

The Tampa Port Authority operates three cruise ship terminals in Tampa's Channel District. The Port of Tampa is the year-round home port for Carnival Cruise Lines' MS Carnival Paradise and seasonally, the MS Carnival Pride. Tampa is also a seasonal port for Holland America Line, Norwegian Cruise Line, Celebrity Cruises, as well as Royal Caribbean International's MS Rhapsody of the Seas and MS Radiance of the Seas. Cruise itineraries from Tampa include stops in the Western Caribbean islands, Honduras, Belize, and Mexico. Longer sailings include the Panama Canal, the ABC Islands and the Eastern Caribbean.

=== Events ===
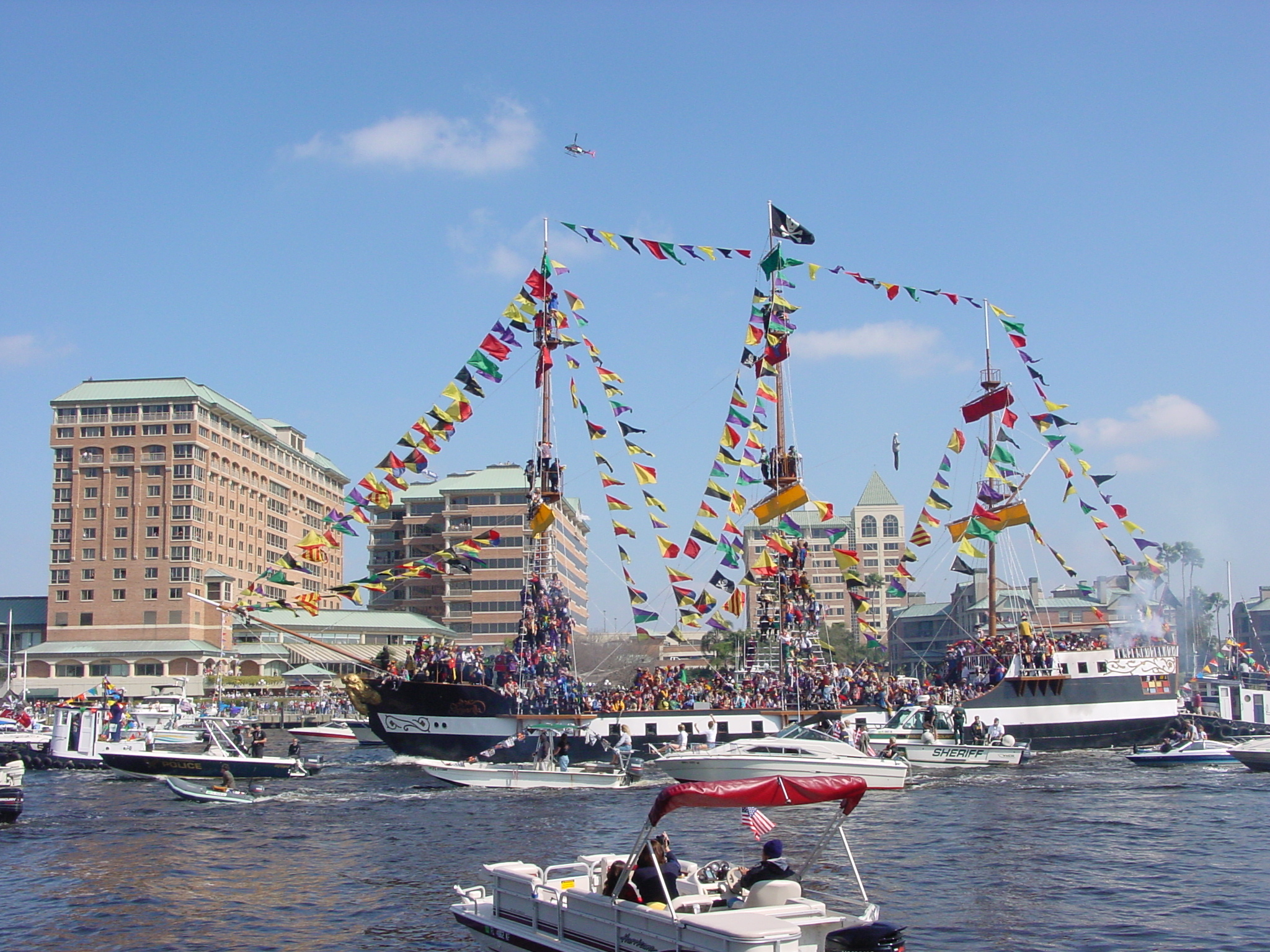
The Gasparilla Pirate Festival and pirate ship

Perhaps the most well known and anticipated events are those from Tampa's annual celebration of "Gasparilla", particularly the Gasparilla Pirate Festival, a mock pirate invasion held since 1904 in late January or early February. Often referred to as Tampa's "Mardi Gras", the invasion flotilla led by the pirate ship, Jose Gasparilla, and subsequent parade draw over 400,000 attendees, contributing tens of millions of dollars to the city's economy. Beyond the initial invasion, numerous Gasparilla festivities take place each year between January and March, including the Gasparilla Children's Parade, the more adult-oriented Sant'Yago Knight Parade, the Gasparilla Distance Classic, Gasparilla Festival of the Arts, and the Gasparilla International Film Festival, among other pirate themed events. The Gasparilla parade is the third largest parade in the United States.

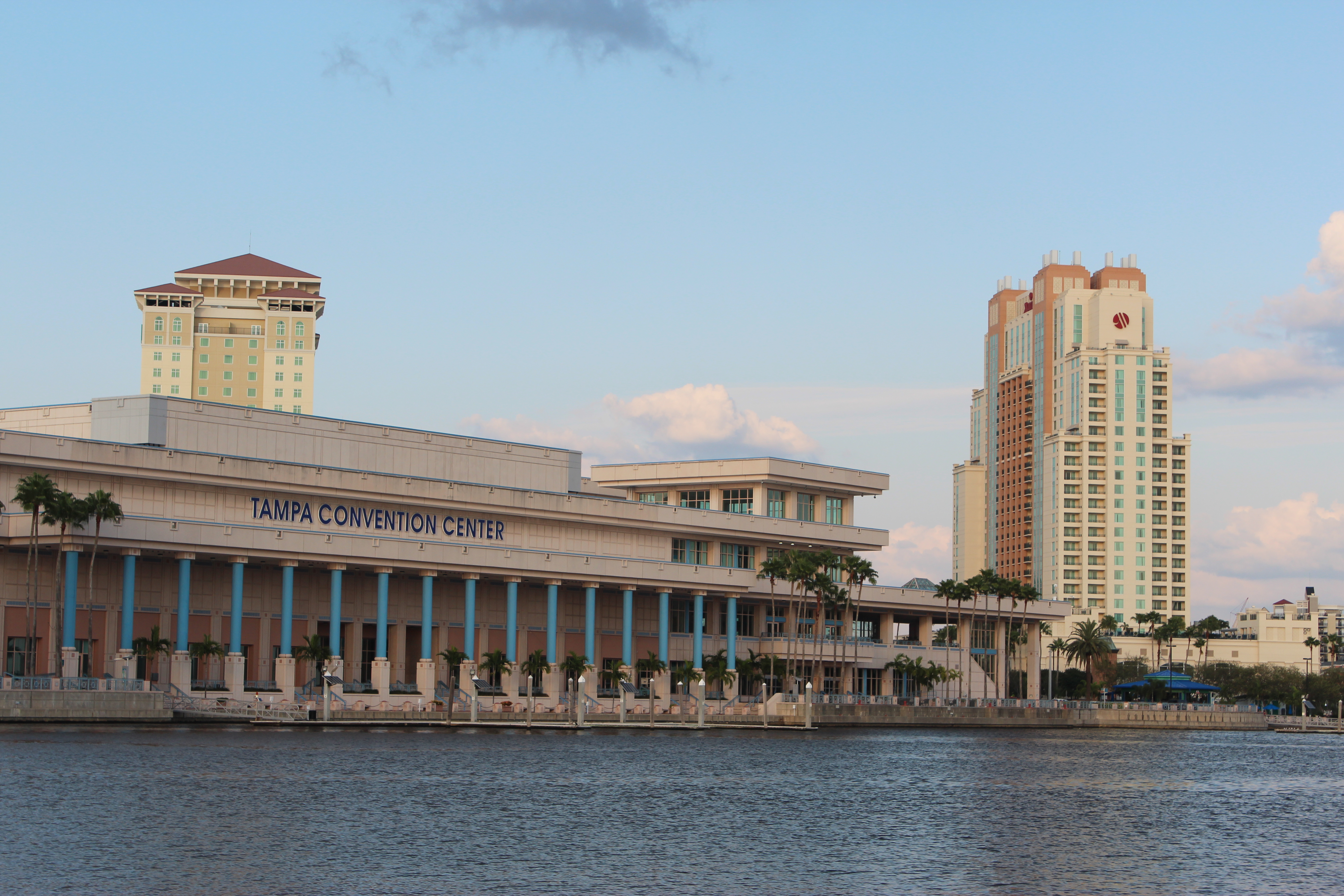
Tampa Convention Center, built at the site of Fort Brooke

Other notable events include the Outback Bowl, which is held New Year's Day at Raymond James Stadium. Each February, The Florida State Fair brings crowds from across the state, while "Fiesta Day" celebrates Tampa's Cuban, Spanish, German, Italian, English, Irish, Jewish, and African-Cuban immigrant heritage. The India International Film Festival (IIFF) of Tampa Bay also takes place in February. In April the MacDill Air Fest entertains as one of the largest military air shows in the U.S. Guavaween, a nighttime street celebration infuses Halloween with the Latin flavor of Ybor City.

Downtown Tampa hosts the largest anime convention in Florida, Metrocon, a three-day event held in either June or July at the Tampa Convention Center. Ybor also hosts "GaYbor Days", an annual street party in the LGBT-friendly GaYbor district. The Tampa International Gay and Lesbian Film Festival, held annually since 1989, is the city's largest film festival event, and one of the largest independent gay film festivals in the country.

Tampa hosted the 2012 Republican National Convention and the 15th International Indian Film Academy Awards in April 2014.

Since 2015, Tampa has hosted the annual Tampa Riverfest, typically held during the first weekend of May. Held at the Tampa Riverwalk, the festival welcomes many musical artists and local restaurants.

In March 2024, Tampa hosted its First International Book Fair. Held at the Ybor City Hillsborough Community College Campus, the festival welcomed many renowned authors, publishing houses, and for the first time hosted a Virtual Interview program that included author form at least five countries

== Sports ==
Team	League	Stadium	First season	Championships
Tampa Bay Buccaneers	National Football League (NFL)	Raymond James Stadium	1976	2 (XXXVII, LV)
Tampa Bay Lightning	National Hockey League (NHL)	Benchmark International Arena	1992	3 (2004, 2020, 2021)
Tampa Bay Rays	Major League Baseball (MLB)	Tropicana Field	1998	0
Tampa Bay Rowdies	United Soccer League (USL)	Al Lang Stadium (St. Petersburg)	1975 (original club), 2010 (current club)	3 (1975, 2012, 2020*)
Tampa Bay Titans	The Basketball League (TBL)	A. P. Leto High School	2019	0
Tampa Bay Sun	USL Super League	Suncoast Credit Union Field	2024–25	1 (2024–25)

*Co-champions, championship game canceled due to COVID-19 pandemic.

=== Professional sports ===
Tampa is represented by teams in three major professional sports leagues: the National Football League (NFL), the National Hockey League (NHL), and Major League Baseball (MLB). The NFL's Tampa Bay Buccaneers and the NHL's Tampa Bay Lightning play at venues in the city, while the MLB's Tampa Bay Rays are across the bay in St. Petersburg. These teams, plus several other sports teams, represent the entire Tampa metropolitan area and have won eight combined championships in their respective leagues. Between September 2020 and July 2021, all three of Tampa Bay's major teams, as well as the Tampa Bay Rowdies of the USL Championship, qualified for their sport's championship games or series. This period earned the area the nickname "Champa Bay".

The Buccaneers entered the NFL in 1976 as an expansion team and have won two Super Bowl championships: Super Bowl XXXVII in 2003; and Super Bowl LV in 2020. The team originally played at Tampa Stadium, a multipurpose stadium that also hosted other tenants, until the opening of Raymond James Stadium in 1998. Raymond James Stadium has a seating capacity of 69,000 spectators and an open-air design; it has hosted two editions of the Super Bowl. The area has also been home to several minor league football teams. The Tampa Bay Bandits of the United States Football League played from 1983 to 1985 at Tampa Stadium and were initially had success that was comparable to the Buccaneers and drew large crowds. The team folded along with the rest of the USFL after the 1985 season. The Tampa Bay Vipers of the XFL, a springtime league, played their 2020 season at Raymond James Stadium before relocating to Las Vegas. The Tampa Bay Storm of the Arena Football League (AFL) played in St. Petersburg and Tampa from 1991 to 2017, winning five league championships.

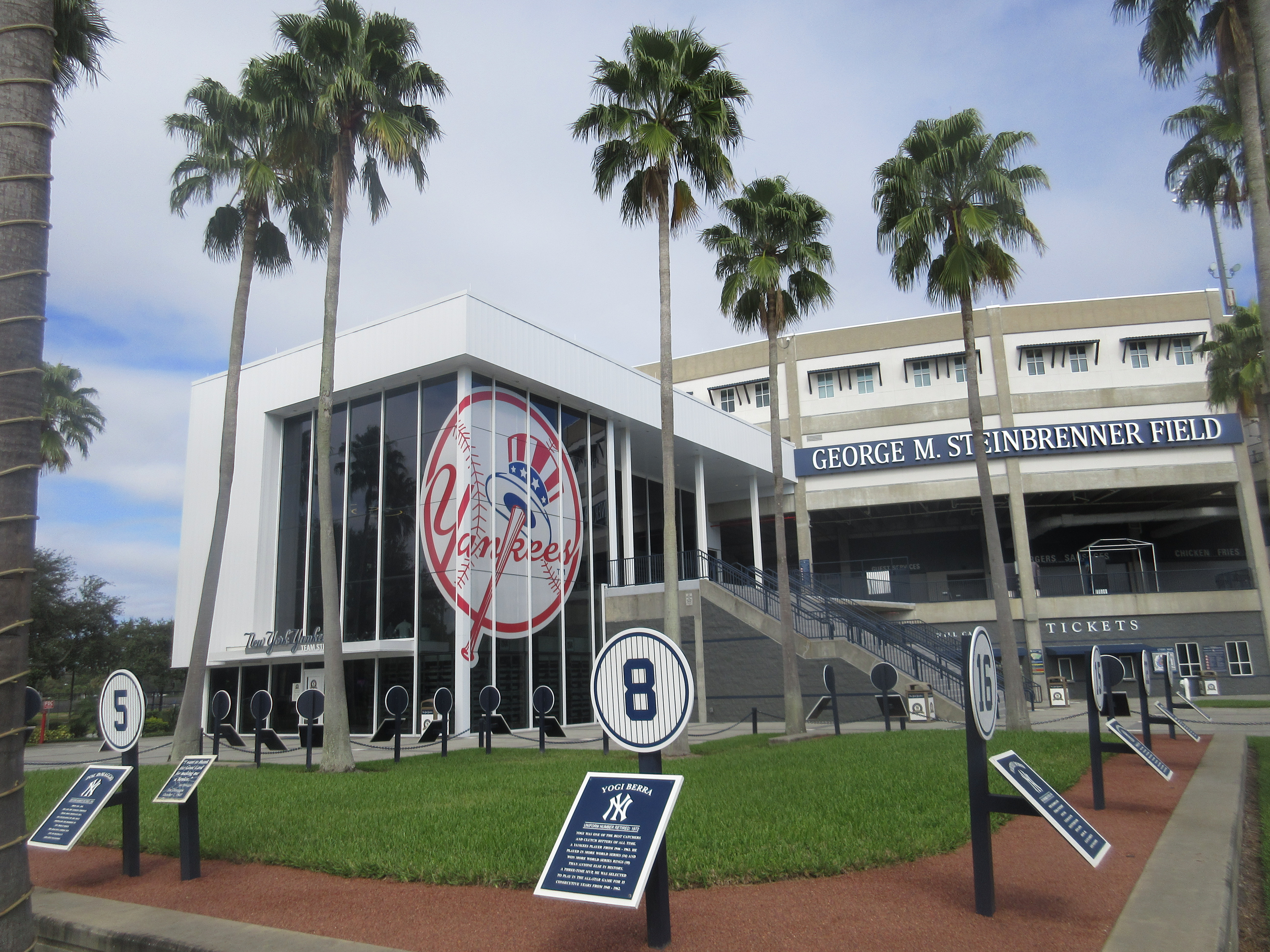
Steinbrenner Field, a ballpark used for spring training by the New York Yankees

In 1998, MLB expansion team Tampa Bay Rays (originally named the Devil Rays) began play at Tropicana Field in St. Petersburg. A major-league team had been long-sought by the region, which had long been home to nationally competitive amateur and minor league teams for decades. The Tampa Bay area has long been a site for spring training facilities, beginning with the Chicago Cubs in 1913, and continue to be home to the New York Yankees. The Rays finished as runners-up in the 2008 World Series and 2020 World Series, the latter of which was played entirely at a single venue in each series due to the COVID-19 pandemic. Plans to replace Tropicana Field with a new ballpark in Tampa or another location have been discussed since 2007 with various sites proposed and abandoned. The Rays temporarily relocated to George M. Steinbrenner Field, a spring training facility, for the 2025 season due to roof damage at Tropicana Field after Hurricane Milton passed through the area. A new stadium at the Hillsborough College campus in Tampa is proposed to open by 2029. The Tampa Bay area also has three minor league teams that play in the Florida State League.

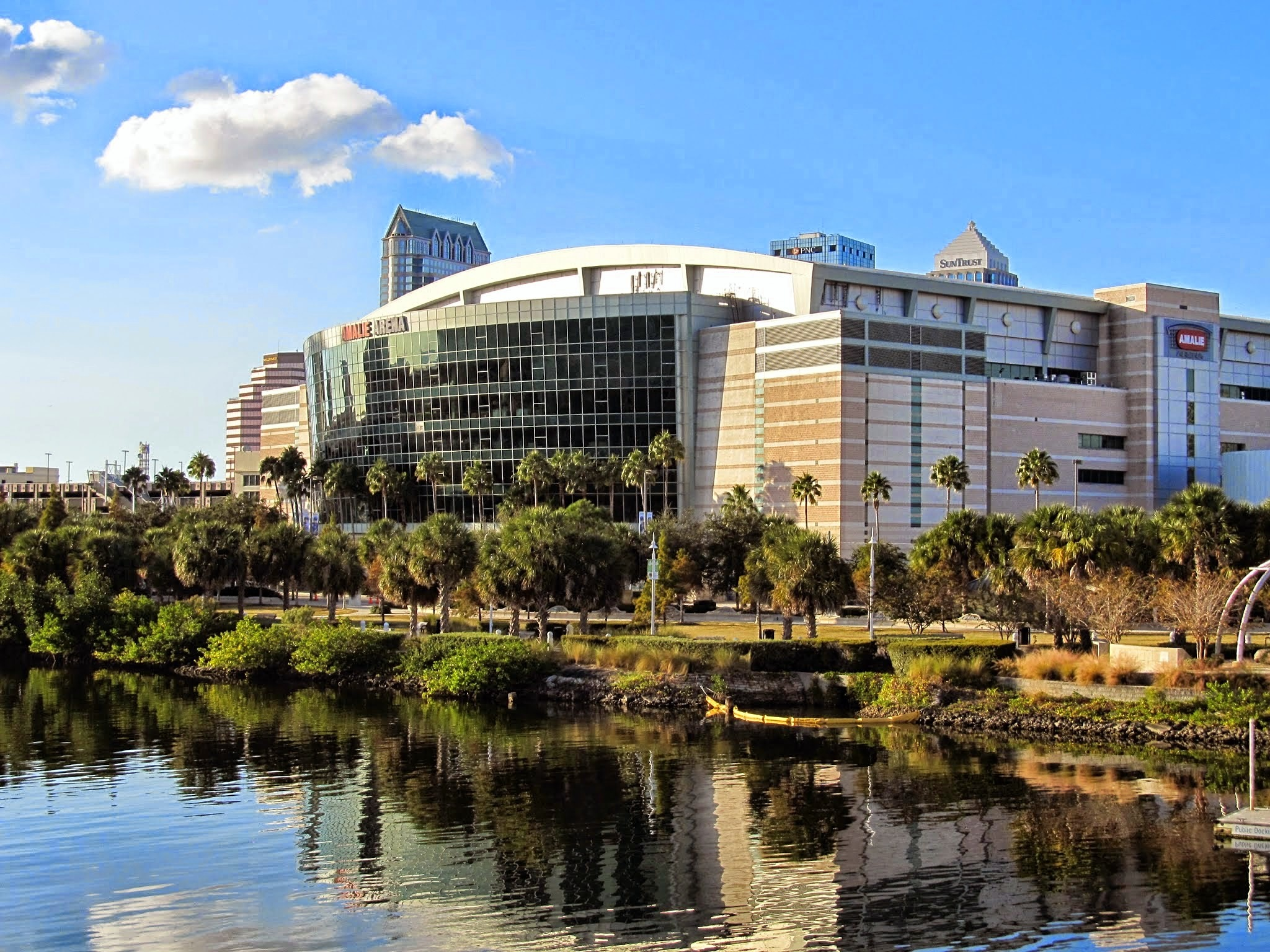
Benchmark International Arena, home of the Tampa Bay Lightning

The Tampa Bay Lightning of the NHL were established in 1992 and named for the city's frequent lightning storms. The team plays at Benchmark International Arena in Downtown Tampa and have won three Stanley Cups in 2004, 2020, and 2021. Benchmark International Arena also hosted the 2018 NHL All-Star Game and the Toronto Raptors of the National Basketball Association during the 2020–2021 season due to international travel restrictions during the COVID-19 pandemic. Tampa had previously hosted exhibition preseason games for Florida's two NBA teams, but the Raptors were the first to play regular season games in the region. A minor league team, the Tampa Bay Titans of The Basketball League (TBL), play home games at A. P. Leto High School.

Tampa has hosted several professional soccer teams since the 1970s under the Tampa Bay Rowdies name. The original Rowdies team played in the North American Soccer League (NASL) and successor leagues from 1975 to 1993; they won the NASL championship in their inaugural season and were runners-up in 1978 and 1979. The next top-level professional league in the United States, Major League Soccer, awarded Tampa a franchise for their inaugural 1996 season. The Tampa Bay Mutiny began play that year and won the first Supporters' Shield, but folded in 2002 after a local ownership group could not be found to purchase the team from the league. The Rowdies name was revived in 2012 as part of a rebranding of FC Tampa Bay in the second-division North American Soccer League. The team won a league championship in 2012 and moved in 2017 to the USL Championship, where they still compete. The Rowdies have played at Al Lang Field, a converted baseball stadium in St. Petersburg, since 2011; the ownership group had sought a Major League Soccer expansion team that would play at Al Lang Field or another venue. Top-division women's team Tampa Bay Sun FC were founded in 2023 and play in the USL Super League with home matches at Suncoast Credit Union Field,. Sun FC won the inaugural Super League championship.

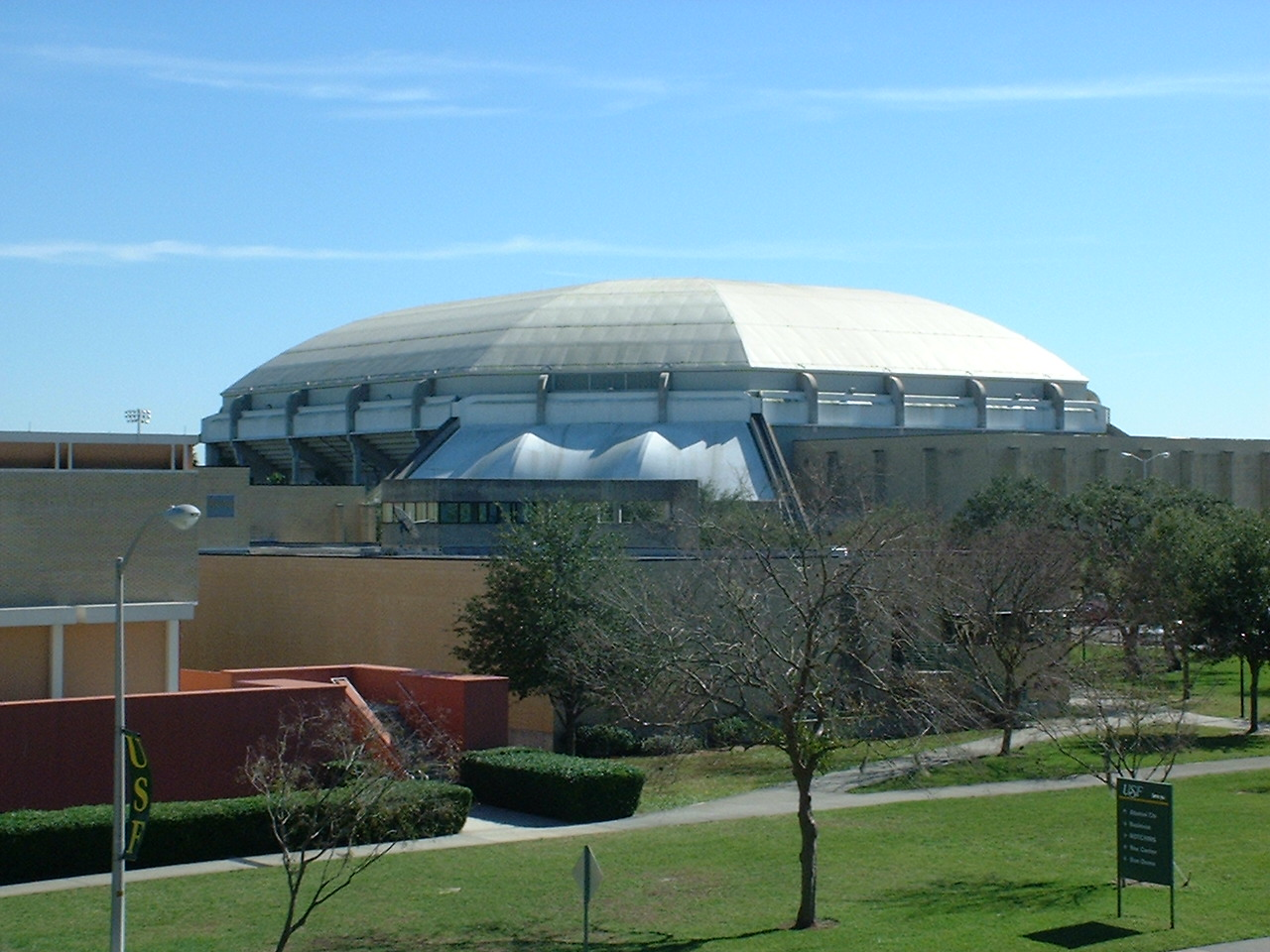
The Yuengling Center

=== College sports ===
On the collegiate level, the University of South Florida Bulls compete in 17 sports in NCAA Division I. The Bulls began playing intercollegiate sports in 1965 and established their football team in 1997. The football team moved to the Big East Conference in 2005 and later the American Athletic Conference in a 2013 realignment. USF has won six NCAA national championships: softball in 1983 and 1984, women's swimming in 1985, and sailing in 2009, 2016, and 2017. The University of Tampa Spartans compete in 20 sports in NCAA Division II and are members of the Sunshine State Conference. They have won a total of 19 Division II National Championships, including eight in baseball.

The Tampa area has hosted several championship and tournament events for NCAA Division I sports. The 2017 College Football Playoff National Championship was played at Raymond James Stadium. Tampa Stadium was home to the men's College Cup soccer tournament finals from 1978 to 1980, while the USF Soccer Stadium hosted the same tournament in 1990 and 1991. The 1999 NCAA Division I Men's Basketball Final Four was played at Tropicana Field. Benchmark International Arena has hosted earlier rounds of the men's and women's basketball tournaments on a regular basis since 2008. The men's ice hockey tournament hosted its final rounds at Benchmark International Arena in 2012, 2016, and 2023; the women's ice hockey tournament was played there in 2009.

The Hillsborough Community College Hawks are an NJCAA Division I junior college team and a member of the Florida College System Activities Association they compete in the Suncoast Conference and the Southern Conference in Region VIII of The National Junior College Athletic Association (NJCAA).

== Government ==
=== Mayor ===
Tampa is governed under the strong mayor form of government. The Mayor of Tampa is the chief executive officer of city government and is elected in four-year terms, with a limit of two consecutive terms. The mayor is Jane Castor, who took office on May 1, 2019.

=== City Council ===
The City Council is a legislative body served by seven members. Four members are elected from specific numbered areas designated City Districts. The other three are "at-large" members (serving citywide).

=== Fire department ===
The city of Tampa is served by Tampa Fire Rescue. With 23 fire stations, the department provides fire and medical protection for Tampa and New Tampa, and provides support to other departments such as Tampa International Airport, Hillsborough County Fire Rescue and MacDill Air Force Base 6th Medical Group.

=== Law enforcement ===
The Tampa Police Department has over 1,000 sworn officers and many civilian service support personnel. The chief of police is chosen by the mayor and approved by the city council.

=== Elections ===
Municipal elections are held on the first Tuesday of March. A runoff election, if necessary occurs on the fourth Tuesday of April. All city officials elected during the March elections take office on May 1. The supervisor of elections Hillsborough County is responsible for all municipal elections in the city. Based on the legislation passed by the Board of County Commissioners for Hillsborough County, any registered voter may ask to receive accommodations in voting based on their specific health condition.

=== Other offices ===
There are several other government offices in the city apart from the Mayor, City Council, Fire Department and Police Department. There is a: City Clerk, Legal, Internal Audit along with a Revenue and Finance Department as well.

== Education ==
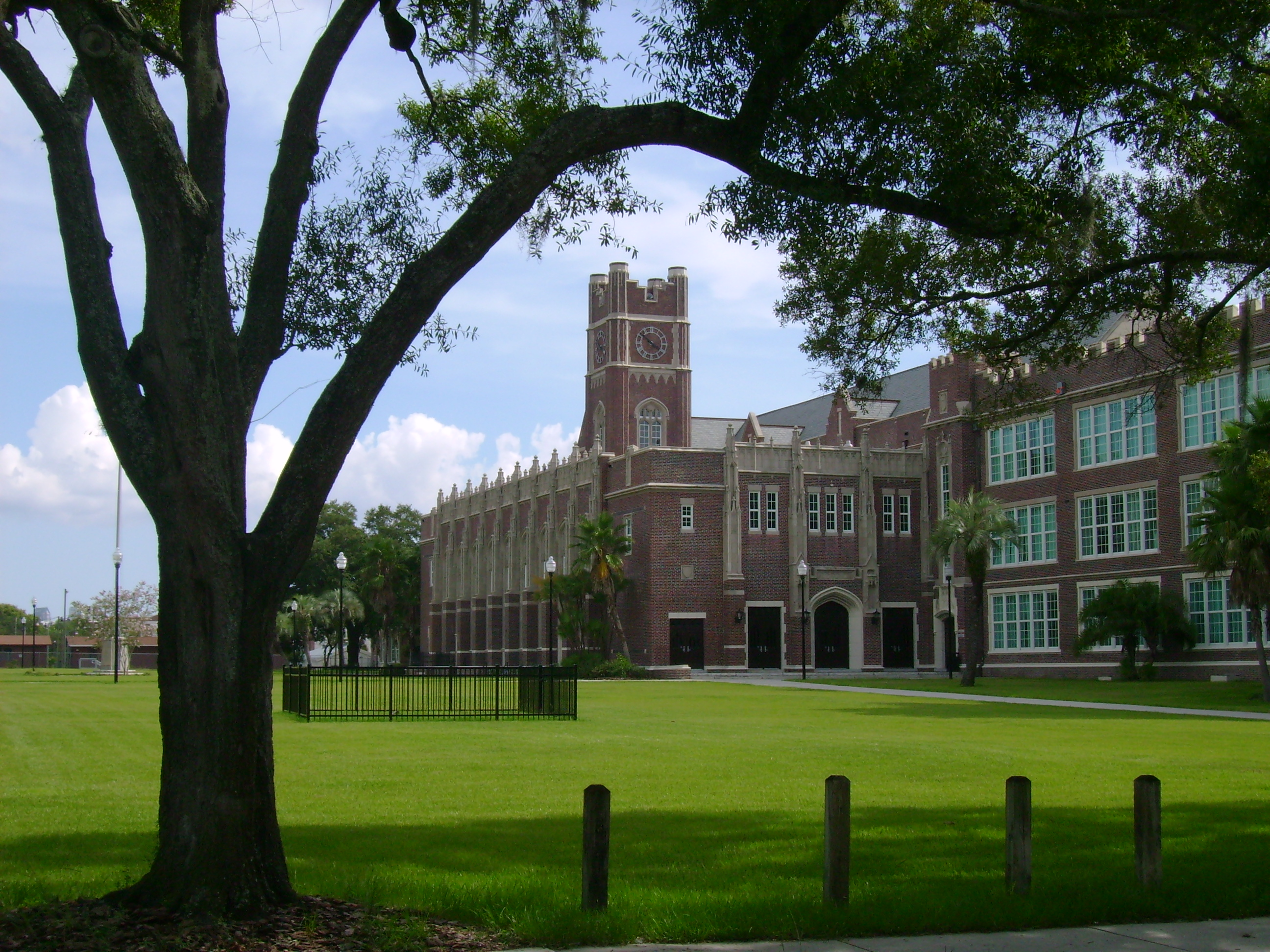
Hillsborough High School in Seminole Heights

=== Primary and secondary schools ===
Public primary and secondary education is operated by Hillsborough County Public Schools, officially known as the School District of Hillsborough County (SDHC). It is the eighth-largest school district in the United States, with around 189,469 enrolled students. SDHC runs 208 schools, 133 being elementary, 42 middle, 27 high schools, two K–8s, and four career centers. There are 73 additional schools in the district that are charter, ESE, alternative, etc. Twelve out of 27 high schools in the SDHC are included in Newsweek's list of America's Best High Schools.

=== Public libraries ===
Tampa's library system is operated by the Tampa-Hillsborough County Public Library System. THPLS operates 25 libraries throughout Tampa and Hillsborough County, including the John F. Germany Public Library in Downtown Tampa. The Tampa library system first started in the early 20th century, with the West Tampa Library, which was made possible with funds donated by Andrew Carnegie.

Tampa's libraries are also a part of a larger library network, The Hillsborough County Public Library Cooperative, which includes the libraries of the neighboring municipalities of Temple Terrace and Plant City. The Hillsborough County Library Cooperative follows similar structure and design as the Pasco County Library Cooperative which is based on providing a network for all citizens and students of said county to be given equal opportunity and access to literature regardless of location.

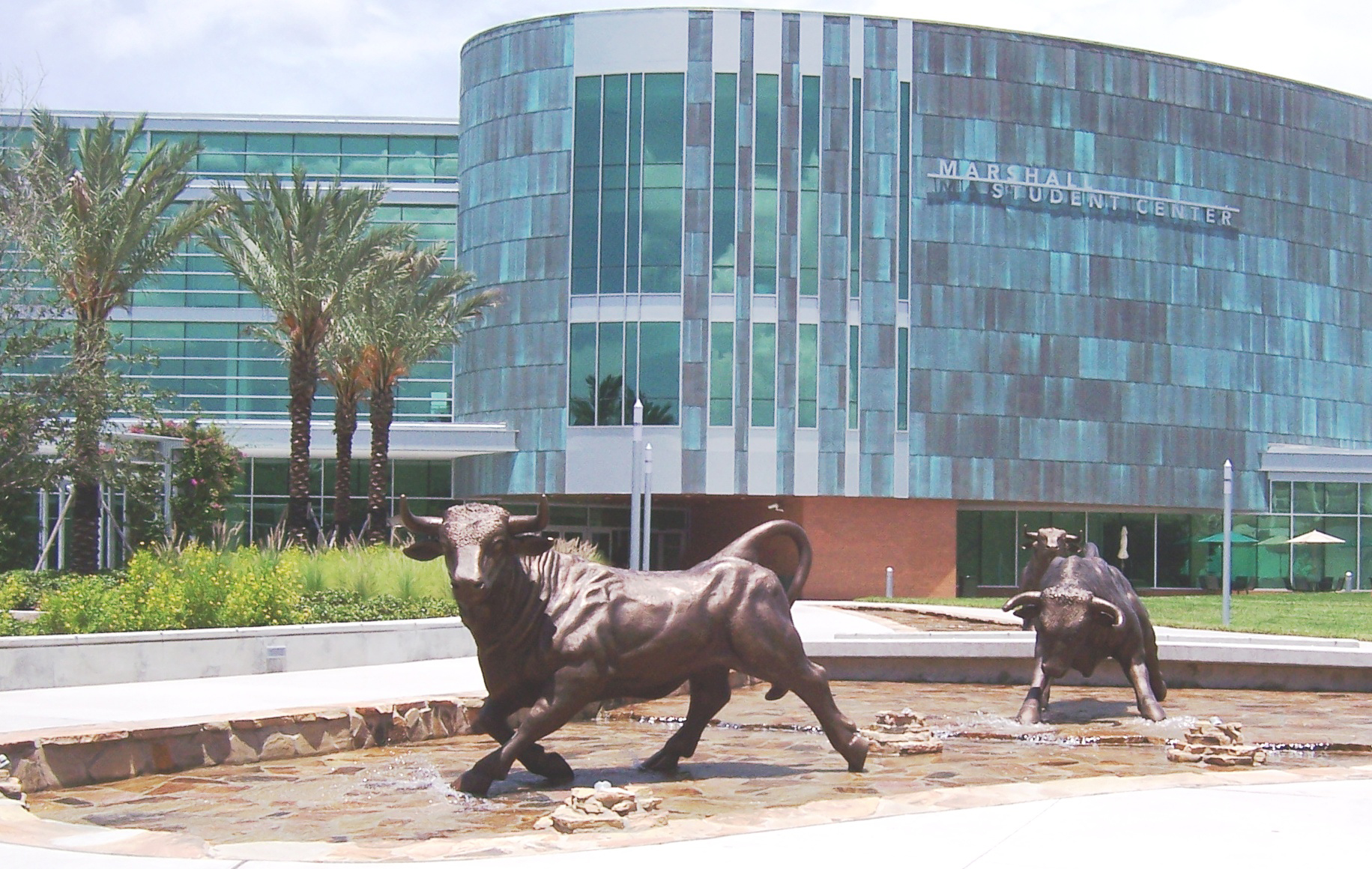
The University of South Florida's Marshall Student Center

=== Higher education ===
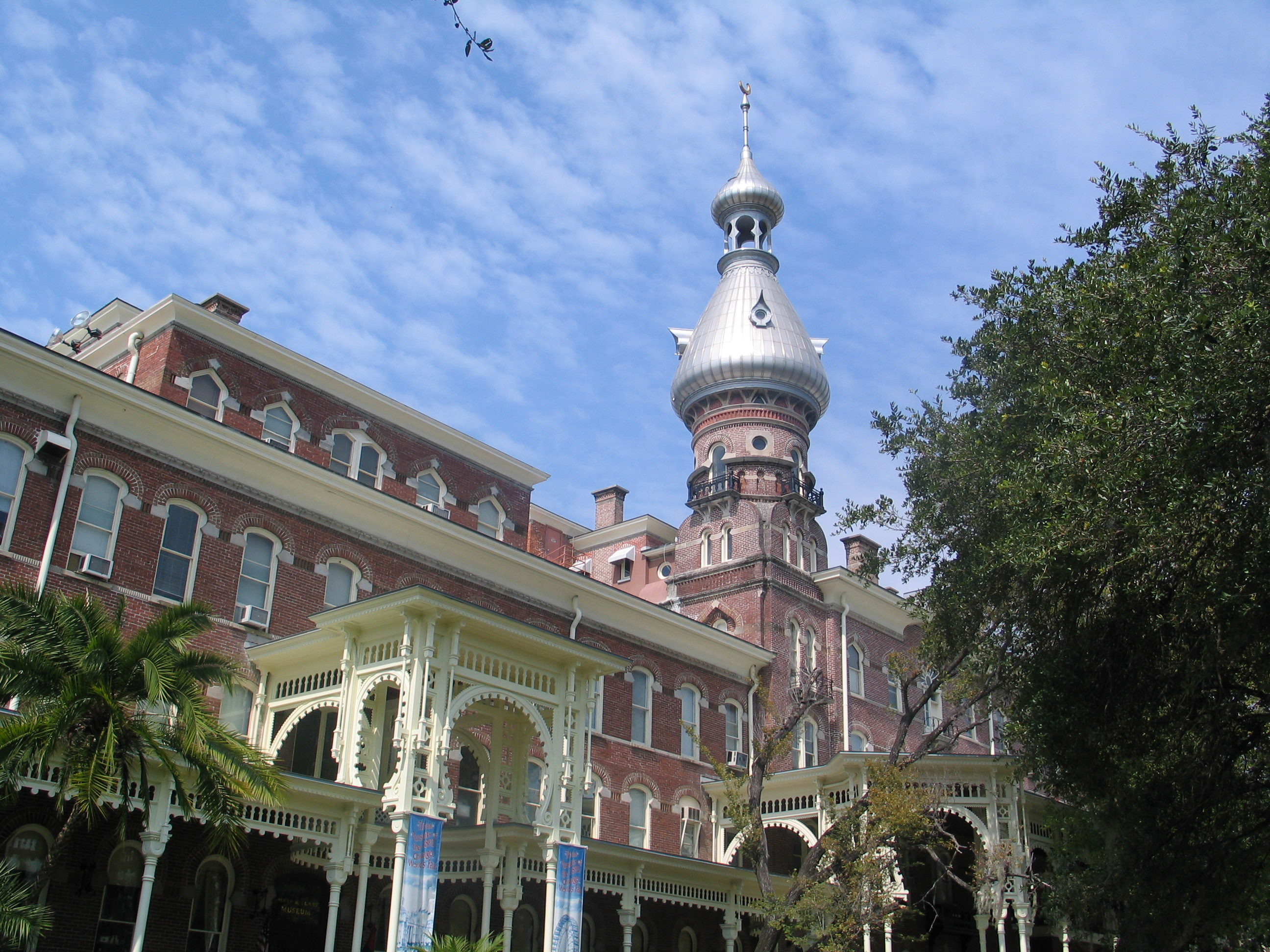
The University of Tampa's Plant Hall

There are a number of institutions of higher education in Tampa.

The city is home to the main campus of the University of South Florida (USF), a member of the State University System of Florida founded in 1956. USF is classified among "R1: Doctoral Universities – Very high research activity" and is one of only three universities in Florida designated as a Preeminent State Research University. As of 2021, USF has the seventh highest undergraduate enrollment in the U.S. with over 51,000 students.

The University of Tampa (UT) is a private, four-year liberal arts institution. It was founded in 1931, and in 1933, it moved into the former Tampa Bay Hotel across the Hillsborough River from downtown Tampa. "UT" has undergone several expansions in recent years, and had an enrollment of over 9,000 students in 2018.

Hillsborough Community College is a two-year community college in the Florida College System with campuses in Tampa and Hillsborough County. Southern Technical College is a private two-year college that operates a campus in Tampa. Hillsborough Technical Education Center (HiTEC) is the postsecondary extension of the local areas Public Schools district. The schools provide for a variety of technical training certification courses as well as job placement skills. The Learey Technical College, established in June 1993, offers education in Emergency Medical Technician and Fire Fighter programs.

The Stetson University College of Law is in Gulfport and has a second campus, the Tampa Law Center, in downtown Tampa. The Law Center houses the Tampa branch of Florida's Second District Court of Appeal.

Other colleges and universities in the wider Tampa Bay Area include Jersey College, Eckerd College, Florida College, and St. Petersburg College in St. Petersburg.

== Media ==
The major daily newspaper serving the city is the Tampa Bay Times, which purchased its longtime competition, The Tampa Tribune, in 2016. Print news coverage is also provided by a variety of smaller regional newspapers, alternative weeklies, and magazines, including the Florida Sentinel Bulletin, Creative Loafing, Reax Music Magazine, The Oracle, Tampa Bay Business Journal, MacDill Thunderbolt, and La Gaceta, which notable for being the nation's only trilingual newspaper—English, Spanish, and Italian, owing to its roots in the cigar-making immigrant neighborhood of Ybor City.

Major television stations include WEDU and WEDQ 3 (PBS), WFLA-TV 8 (NBC), WTSP 10 (CBS), WTVT 13 (Fox), WCLF 22 (CTN), WFTS 28 (ABC), WMOR-TV 32 (Independent), WTTA 38 (The CW), WSNN-LD 39 (MyNetworkTV), WTOG 44 (Independent), WVEA 50 (Univision, with UniMás on DT6), WFTT 62 (Religious) and WXPX 66 (Independent, with Ion Television on DT2).

The area is served by dozens of FM and AM radio stations including WDAE, which was the first radio station in Florida when it went on the air in 1922.

== Infrastructure ==
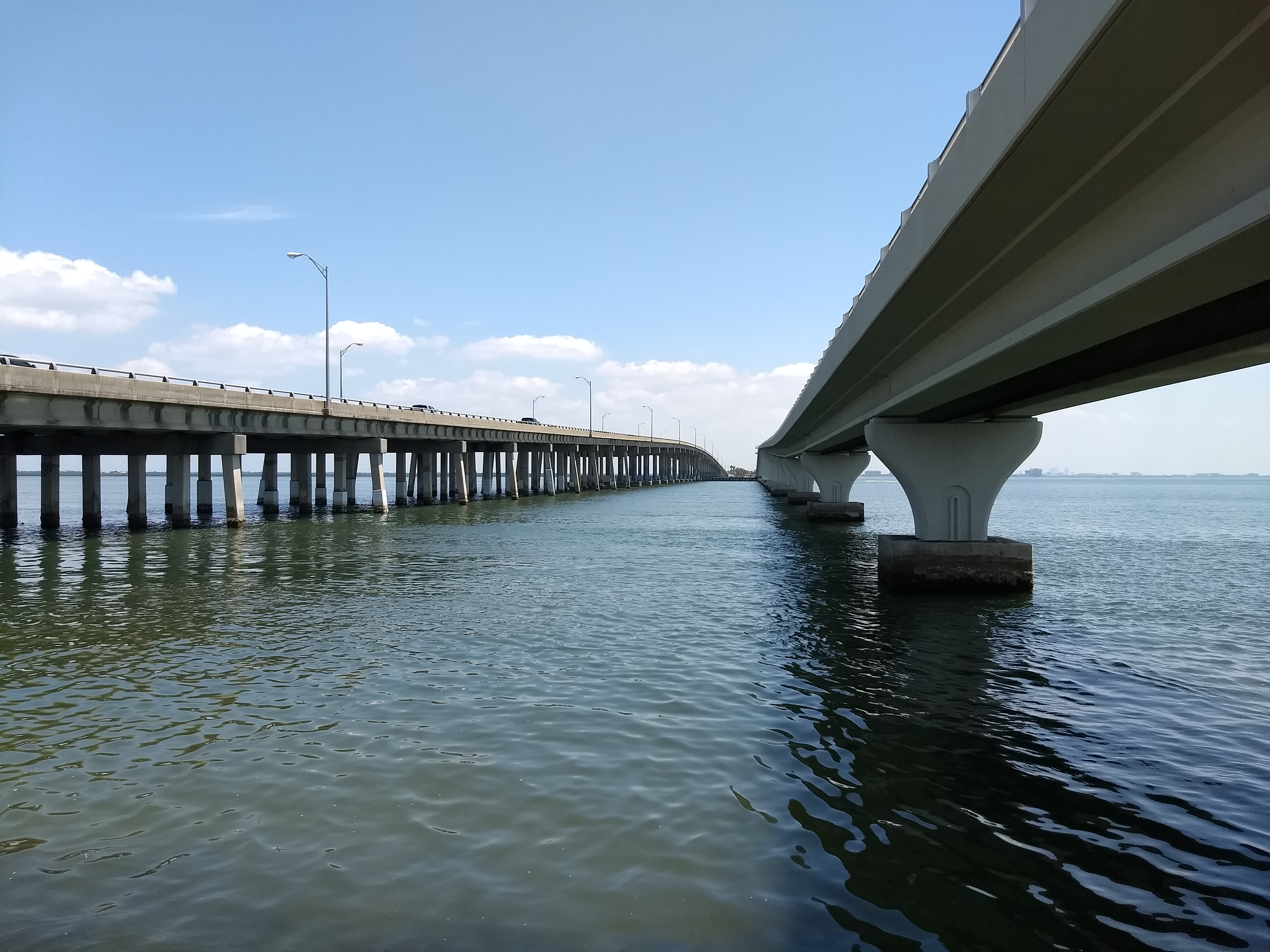
The Courtney Campbell Causeway

=== Transportation ===
==== Roads ====
Three motor vehicle bridges cross Tampa Bay to Pinellas County from Tampa city limits: the Howard Frankland Bridge (I-275), the Courtney Campbell Causeway (SR 60), and the Gandy Bridge (U.S. 92). The old Gandy Bridge was completely replaced by new spans during the 1990s, but a span of the old bridge was saved and converted into a pedestrian and biking bridge renamed The Friendship Trail. It was the longest overwater recreation trail in the world. However, the bridge was closed in 2008 due to structural problems.

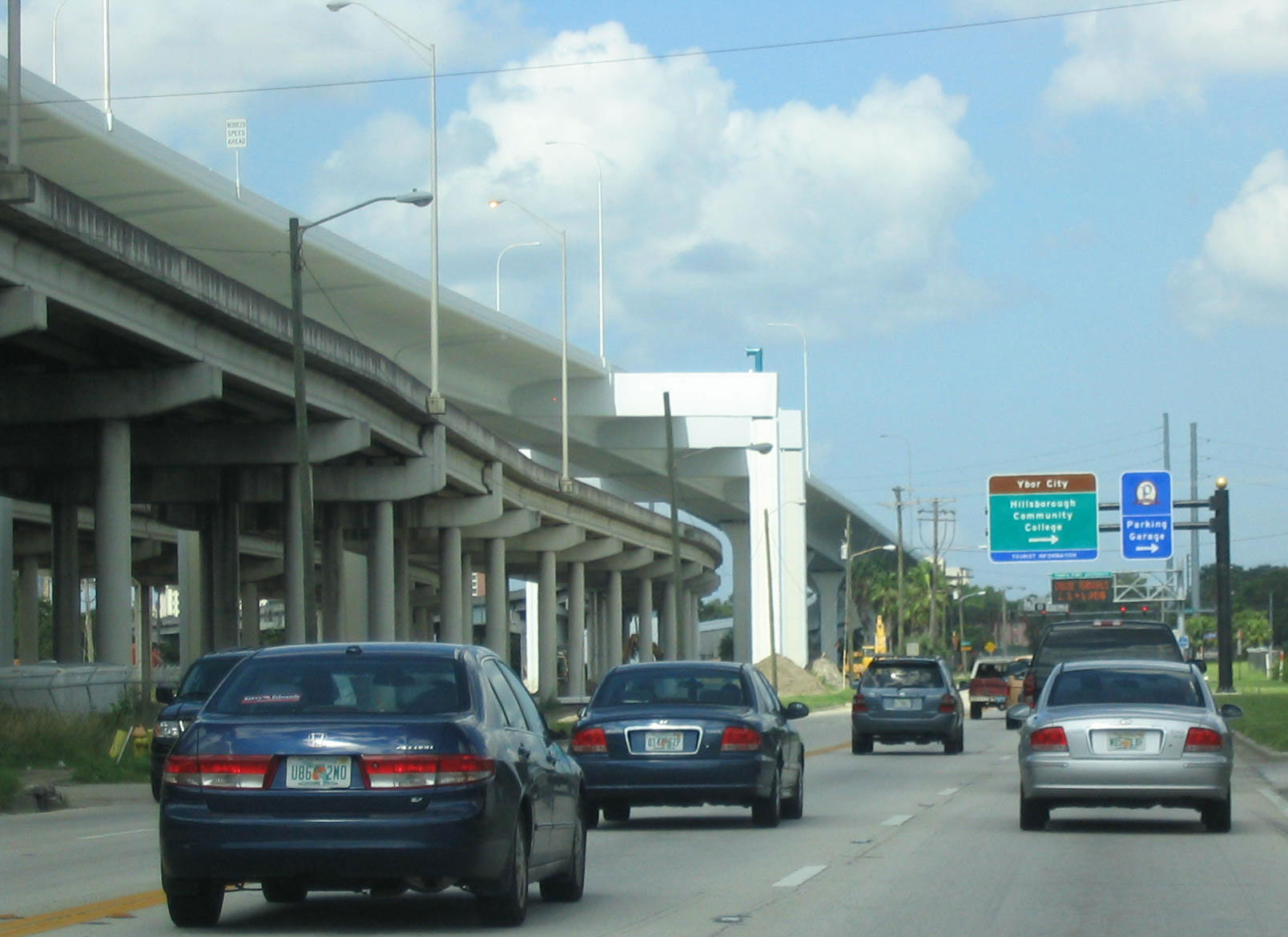
The Lee Roy Selmon Crosstown Expressway features a section that is elevated over parts of the downtown area and part of the Port of Tampa. The even taller bridge carries the Reversible Express Lanes of the expressway.

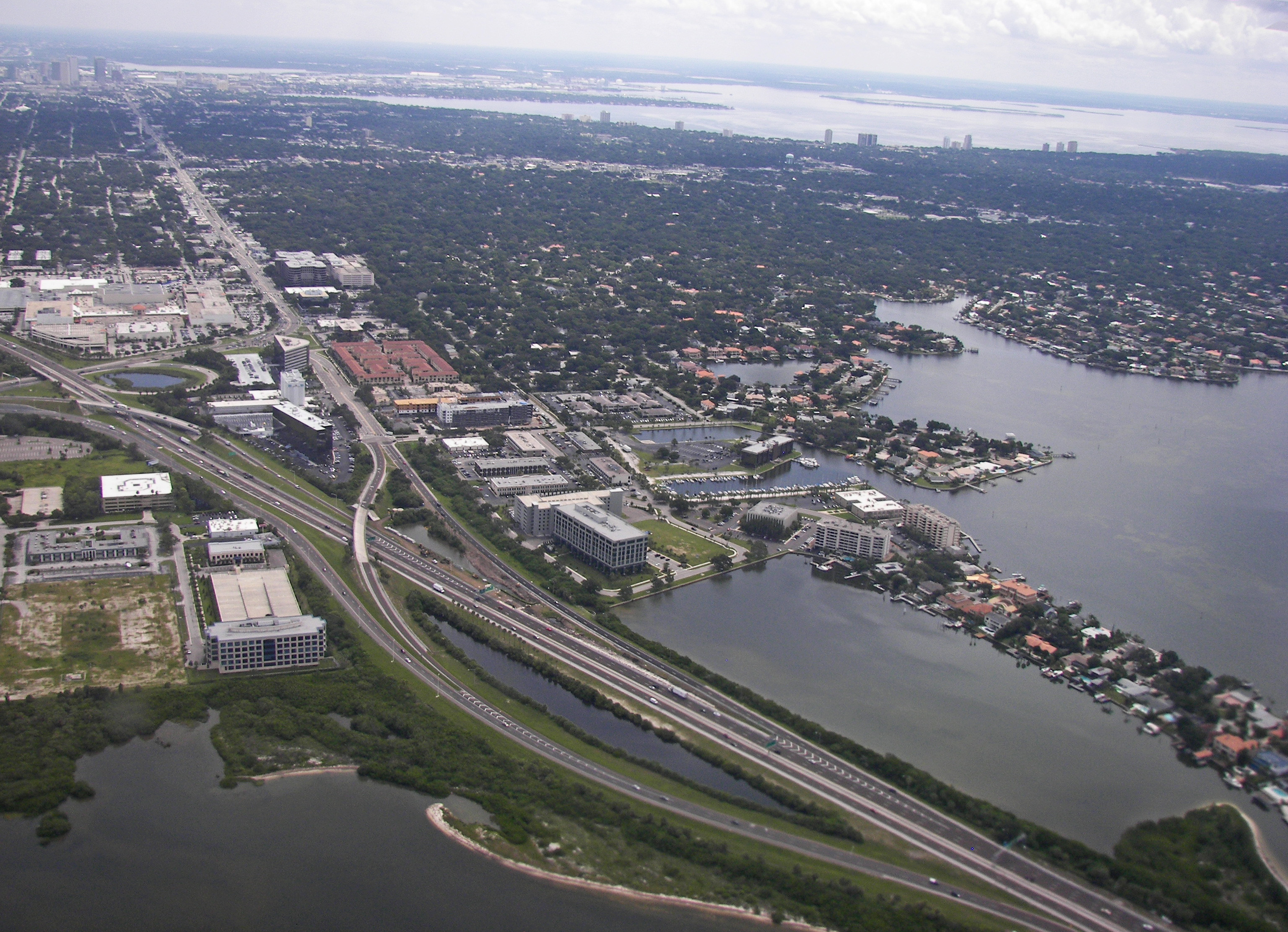
The Eastern terminus of the Howard Frankland Bridge

Tampa has several freeways and toll roads which serve the city. The two toll roads that bring traffic in and out of Tampa include the Lee Roy Selmon Expressway (SR 618), which runs from suburban Brandon at its eastern terminus, through Downtown Tampa, to the neighborhoods in South Tampa (near MacDill Air Force Base) at its western terminus. The other toll road, Veterans Expressway (SR 589), connects Tampa International Airport and the bay bridges to the northwestern suburbs of Carrollwood, Northdale, Westchase, Citrus Park, Cheval, and Lutz, before continuing north as the Suncoast Parkway into Pasco and Hernando counties.

Three of the city's freeways carry the interstate highway designation. Interstate 4 and Interstate 275 cut across the city and intersect near downtown. Interstate 75 runs along the east side of town for much of its route through Hillsborough County until veering to the west to bisect New Tampa.

Along with the city's freeways, major surface roads serve as main arteries of the city. These roads are Hillsborough Avenue (U.S. 92 and U.S. 41), Dale Mabry Highway (U.S. 92), Nebraska Avenue (U.S. 41/SR 45), Florida Avenue (U.S. 41 Business), Bruce B. Downs Boulevard, Fowler Avenue, Busch Boulevard, Kennedy Boulevard (SR 60), Adamo Drive, and Dr. Martin Luther King Jr. Boulevard.

==== Airports ====
Tampa is served by three airports (one in Tampa, two in the metro area) that provide significant scheduled passenger air service:

- Tampa International Airport (IATA: TPA) is Tampa's main airport and the primary location for commercial passenger airline service into the Tampa Bay area. It is also a consistent favorite in surveys of the industry and the traveling public. The readers of Condé Nast Traveler have frequently placed Tampa International in their list of Best Airports, ranking it No. 1 in 2003 and No. 2 in 2008. A survey by Zagat in 2007 ranked Tampa International first among U.S. airports in overall quality. During 2008, it was the 26th-busiest airport in North America.
- St. Pete–Clearwater International Airport (IATA: PIE) lies just across the bay from Tampa International Airport in neighboring Pinellas County. The airport has become a popular destination for discount carriers, with over 90% of its flights are on low-cost carrier Allegiant Air. A joint civil-military aviation facility, it is also home to Coast Guard Air Station Clearwater, the largest air station in the U.S. Coast Guard
- Sarasota–Bradenton International Airport (IATA: SRQ) is in nearby Sarasota. Sarasota airport has more flights to Delta's Atlanta hub than any other city, but also serves several other large U.S. cities.

==== Rail ====
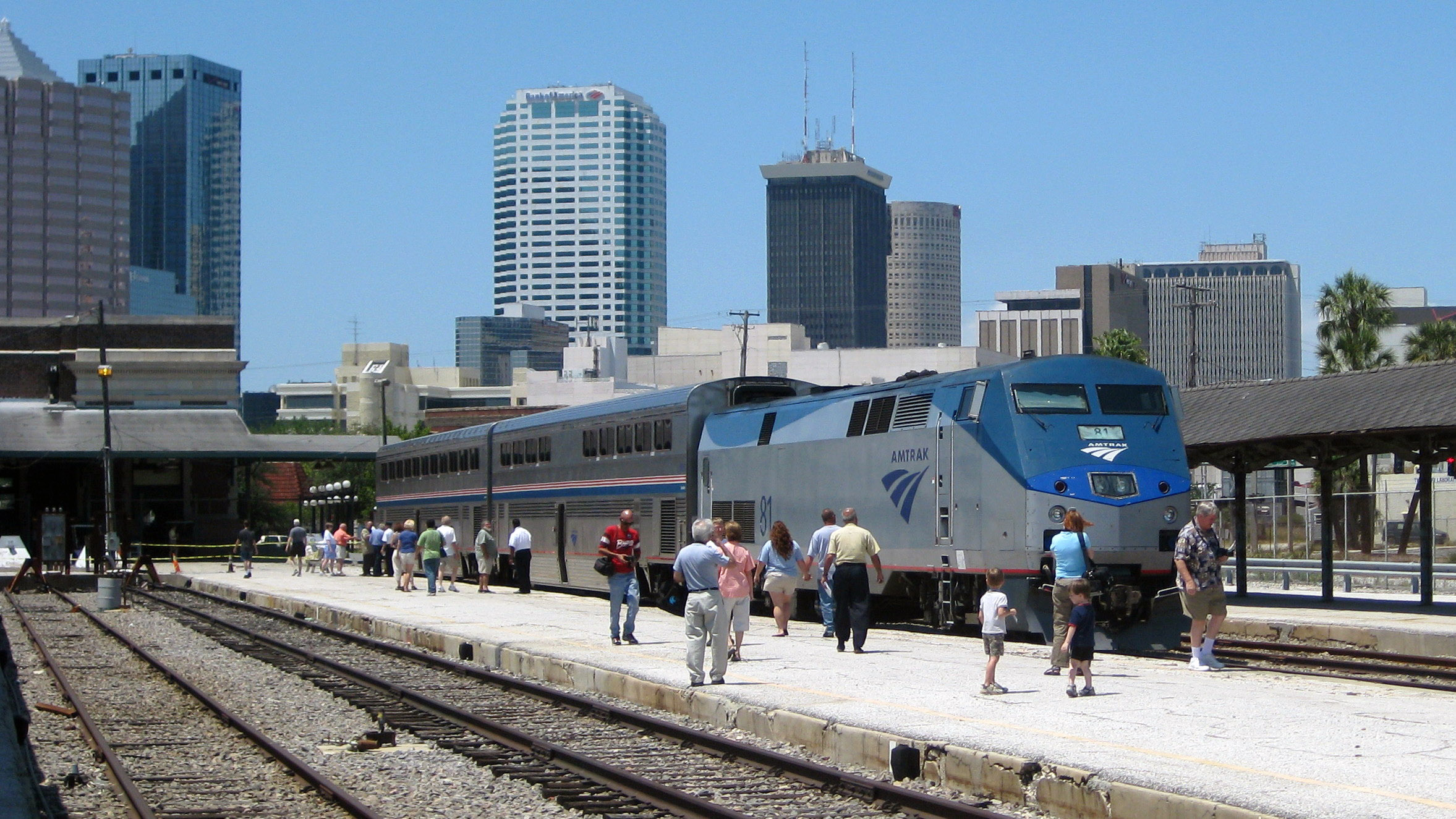
Tampa Union Station platforms

Tampa's intercity passenger rail service is based at Tampa Union Station, a historic facility, adjacent to downtown between the Channel District and Ybor City. The station is served by Amtrak's Floridian, which calls on Tampa twice daily: southbound to Miami and eastbound for Chicago, IL. Union Station also serves as the transfer hub for Amtrak Thruway service, offering bus connections to several cities in southwest Florida and to Orlando.

Uceta Rail Yard on Tampa's east side services CSX as a storage and intermodal freight transport facility. Freight and container cargo operations at the city's seaports also depend upon dockside rail facilities.

==== Seaports ====
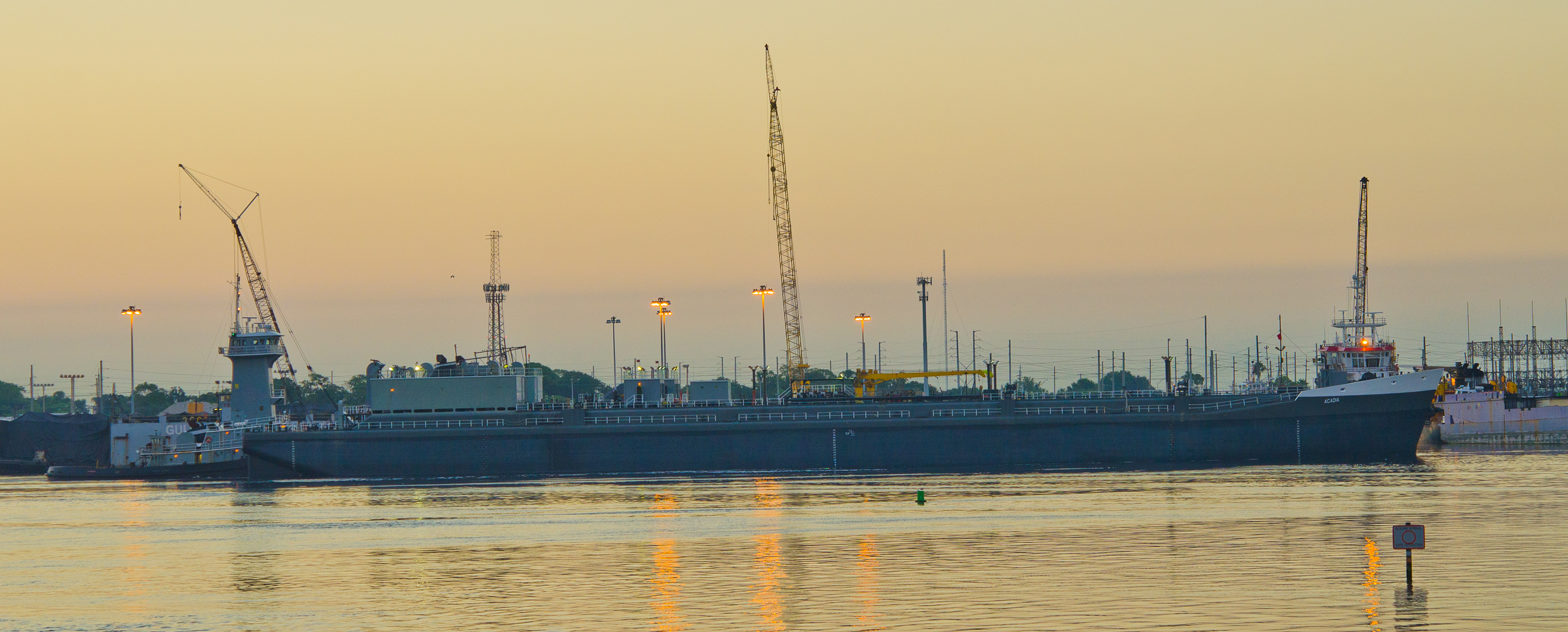
A tugboat pushes a barge at the Port of Tampa.

The Port of Tampa is the largest port in Florida in throughput tonnage, making it one of the busiest commercial ports in North America. Petroleum and phosphate are the lead commodities, accounting for two-thirds of the 37 million tons of total bulk and general cargo handled by the port in 2009. The port is also home to Foreign Trade Zone #79, which assists companies in Tampa Bay and along the I-4 Corridor in importing, exporting, manufacturing, and distribution activities as part of the United States foreign trade zone program.

Weekly containerized cargo service is available in the Port of Tampa. Cargo service is offered by Ports America, Zim American Integrated Shipping Company, and MSC which has recently partnered with Zim. 3,000 to 4,250 TEU containerships regularly call the Port of Tampa.

The bay bottom is very sandy, with the U.S. Army Corps of Engineers constantly dredging the ship channels to keep them navigable to large cargo ships.

==== Mass transit ====
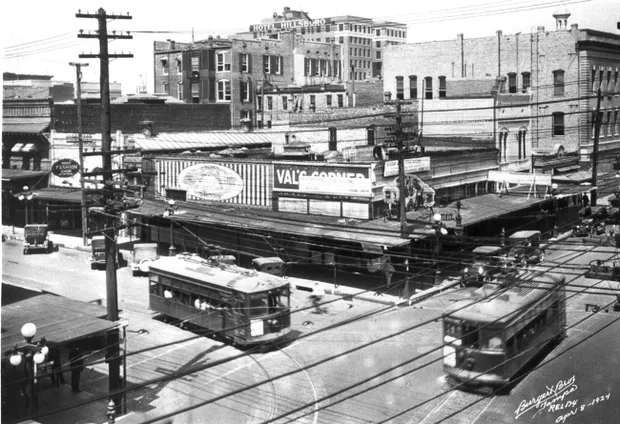
Streetcars in August 1924

From the early 1900s until the late 1940s, Tampa had an extensive streetcar line system that serviced the city. In 1926, the 53 mile long Tampa Electric streetcar system carried almost 24 million passengers. The system had at least 13 different connected lines that ran every 10 to 30 minutes, from around 5 am until midnight. It was shut down after the Second World War, with the city tearing up most of the tracks after buses had replaced service. The last cars were removed from service some time between 1946 and 1949.

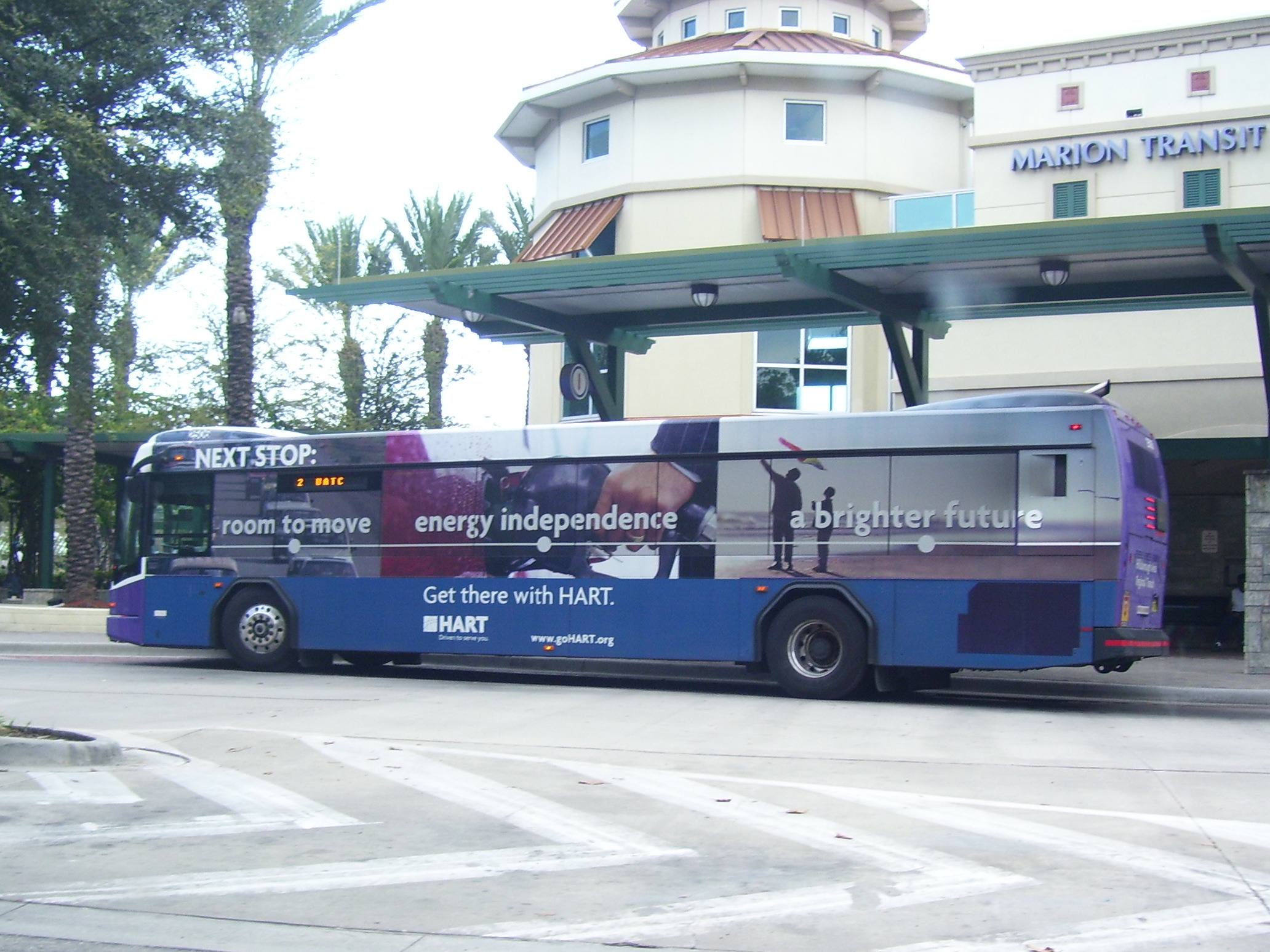
A HARTLine bus at the Marion Transit Center

Public mass transit in Tampa is operated by the Hillsborough Area Regional Transit Authority (HART), and includes public bus as well as a heritage streetcar line. The HART bus system's main hub is the Marion Transit Center in Downtown Tampa, serving 13 local and express routes, along with Greyhound and FlixBus intercity bus routes. HART also operates a bus rapid transit bus system called MetroRapid that runs between Downtown and the University of South Florida. The TECO Line Streetcar provides electric streetcar service along eleven stations on a 2.7 mi (4.3 km) route, connecting Ybor City, the Channel District, the Tampa Convention Center, and downtown Tampa. The TECO Line fleet features varnished wood interiors reminiscent of late 19th and mid-20th century streetcars.

Limited transportation by privately operated "neighborhood electric vehicles" (NEV) is available, primarily in Downtown Tampa and Ybor City. Water taxis are available on a charter basis for tours along the downtown waterfront and the Hillsborough River. The Cross-Bay ferry runs, at a fee, from downtown Tampa to St. Petersburg.

The Tampa Bay Area Regional Transportation Authority (TBARTA) develops bus, light rail, and other transportation options for the seven-county Tampa Bay area.

=== Healthcare ===
There are ten hospitals in Tampa, they are Tampa General Hospital, AdventHealth Tampa, H. Lee Moffitt Cancer Center & Research Institute, HCA Florida South Tampa Hospital, HCA Florida West Tampa, James A. Haley Veterans' Hospital, Kindred Hospital Central Tampa, St. Joseph's Hospital, St. Joseph's Children's Hospital, and St. Joseph's Women's Hospital. Shriners Hospitals for Children has its headquarters in the city. It formerly operated Tampa Shriners Hospital on the campus of University of South Florida, which it downgraded to an outpatient clinic in August 2019. The facility closed on April 1, 2022.

=== Utilities ===
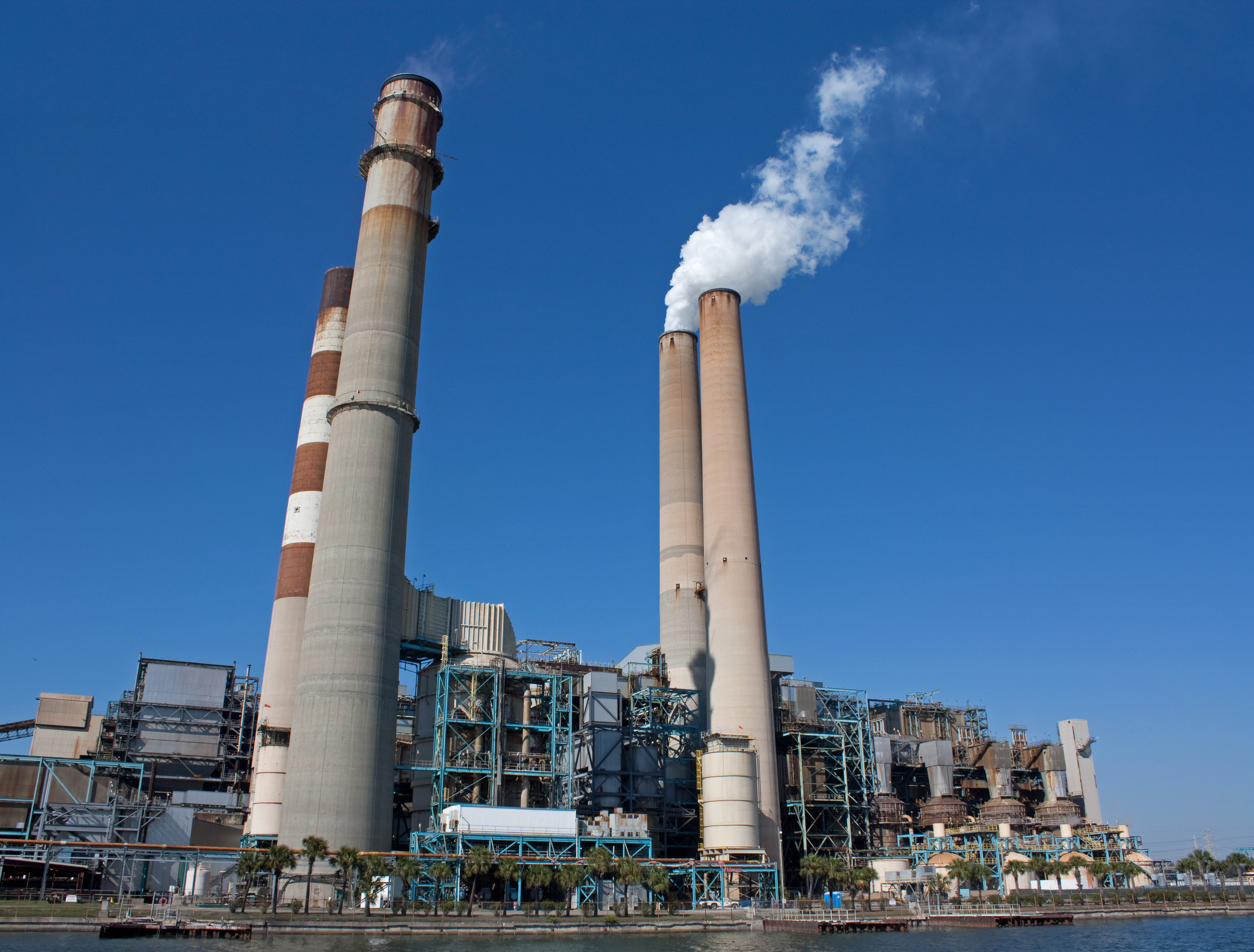
Big Bend Power Station supplies most of the city's energy.

Water in the area is managed by the Southwest Florida Water Management District. The water is mainly supplied by the Hillsborough River, which in turn arises from the Green Swamp, but several other rivers and desalination plants in the area contribute to the supply. Power is mainly generated by TECO Energy.

==== Sustainability ====
The City of Tampa was awarded the LEED for Cities and Communities (Existing) Gold Certification in February 2021 for its commitment to sustainability. Tampa's government has implemented incentives and programs to promote and achieve sustainability, including: expedited building permits for projects seeking LEED certification, increasing water conservation and resiliency through the SWFWMD Water-Wise collaboration, developing a climate equity plan, providing sustainability training to city employees, and increasing coordination for disaster response.

Water Street Tampa was the first neighborhood globally to achieve the WELL Design and Operations designation under the WELL Community Standard. In March 2022, Water Street Tampa achieved LEED silver certification under the category of LEED for Neighborhood Development, making it the first neighborhood in Tampa to achieve the certification.

== Sister cities ==
Tampa has formalized sister city agreements with:

- Agrigento, Italy (1991)
- Ashdod, Israel (2005)
- Barranquilla, Colombia (1966)
- Boca del Río, Mexico (2002)
- Le Havre, France (1993)
- Heraklion, Greece (2019)
- İzmir, Turkey (1993)
- Lanzhou, China (2016)
- Oviedo, Spain (1992)
- Porto Alegre, Brazil (2013)
- (Republic of Ireland) South Dublin County, Ireland (2015)
- Veracruz, Mexico (2002)

== See also ==
- Baldomero López
- List of metropolitan areas in the Americas
- List of public art in Tampa, Florida
- List of United States cities by population
- National Register of Historic Places listings in Tampa, Florida
- Seal of Tampa
