= Temple Crest =

- Neighborhood
- Location within the state of Florida
- Coordinates: 28°1′36″N 82°24′43″W
- Country: United States
- State: Florida
- County: Hillsborough
- City: Tampa
- Time zone: UTC-5 (Eastern (EST))
  - Summer (DST): UTC-4 (EDT)

Temple Crest is a neighborhood and district located northeast of Tampa, Florida. The population was 8,621 at the 2000 census.

== Description ==
Temple Crest's boundaries include 30th Street to the west, Temple Terrace to the east, Busch Blvd. to the north, and the Hillsborough River to the south. Nearby attractions include Busch Gardens, a theme-park located immediately north of the neighborhood, and the University of South Florida, whose campus is located less than two miles (3 km) to the north.

== History ==
Temple Crest was part of a 19,000-acre (77 km^{2}) property called the Riverhills Ranch. Assembled through 1916 by Bertha Potter Palmer (Chicago and Sarasota) included Temple Crest, Temple Terrace, purchased by Mrs. Potter of Chicago in 1914. After her death her sons eventually sold the land to various developers, including D.C. Gillette who developed the world's largest orange grove, a plantation of 5,000 acres (20 km^{2}) of Temple Orange trees. From the Palmer estate was formed Temple Terraces, Inc. (included Temple Crest) and Temple Terrace Estates, Inc.(present day Temple Terrace.)

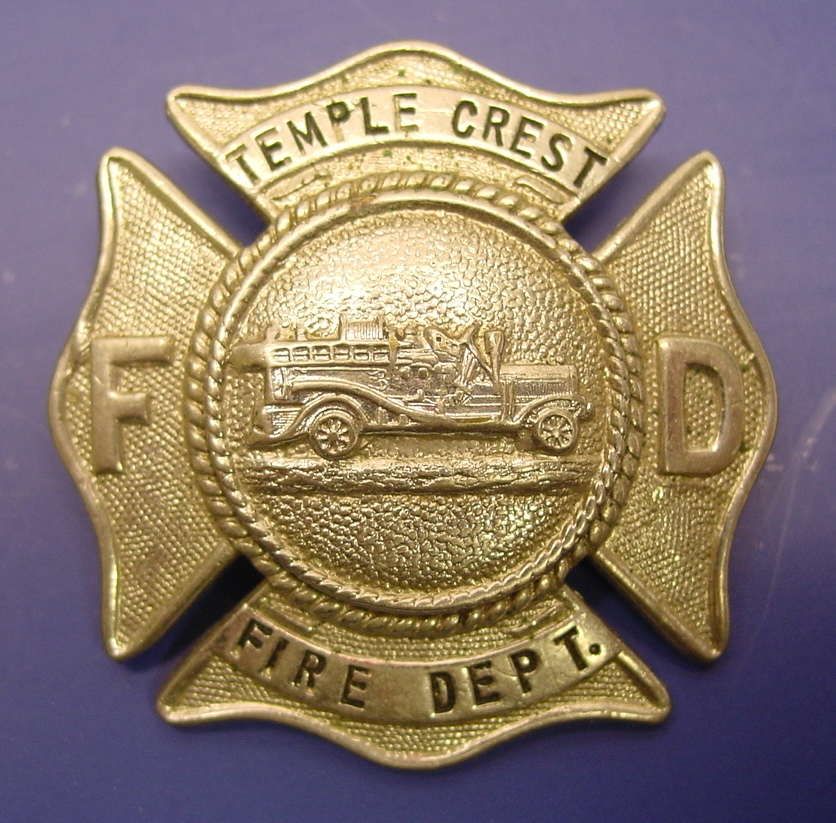
Antique badge from the Temple Crest Fire Department

At the time of its development, Temple Crest was viewed, at the time, as a luxury development, on par with Temple Terrace. On September 12, 1924, further sales of the land called Temple Terraces Inc. was sold to Florida Realty and Mortgage Company for $14,000 and the subdivision was re‑named Temple Crest. The subdivision remained in unincorporated Hillsborough County until it was annexed into Tampa in 1961.

== The Hillsborough River ==
The southern boundary of Temple Crest is the Hillsborough River.

(1897) At a cost of $150,000 an electrical dam is built on the river by Consumers Electric Light and Street Railway Company. The dam was located halfway between present-day 40th Street and 56th Street on the Hillsborough River (today's Temple Crest neighborhood.)

(1898) On December 13, 1898 the dam is dynamited by cattle barons angry at the loss of grazing land. They tried three times. The first on January 8, 1897, shortly after construction was completed. When the water is low, remnants of the dynamited dam can be seen.

(1898–99) TECO buys the Consumers Electric Light and Street Railway Company and builds a new electric generating dam downstream at the current sight north of Sulphur Springs.

(1899) Tampa's first water plant is built by the private Tampa Waterworks Company. It pumped well water to supply the City of Tampa until March 6, 1923, when the people voted to purchase the Waterworks plant.

(1910) Hillsborough Bay is channelized to the mouth of the Hillsborough River with the Rivers and Harbors Act of 1899. In the early 1900s the Hillsborough River watershed is heavily logged for its valuable cypress, pine and oak.6)

(1916) Bertha Potter Palmer (of Chicago and Sarasota) completes purchases of 19,000 acres (77 km^{2}) bordering the Hillsborough River in present-day Temple Terrace, Temple Crest, Terrace Park and the University of South Florida area. She calls her property the Riverhills Ranch, a hunting preserve where she builds a lodge and guest houses among other structures. She dies in 1918.

(1923) The city of Tampa builds a water treatment plant to utilize the water supply from the water above the dam.

(1933) In a torrential 24-hour rain, floods wash away the Tampa Electric dam. TECO does not rebuild the dam and turns to other locations for electrical generating plants.

(1944) The city of Tampa completes construction on the current dam, to be used for the purpose of containing drinking water for the city, at the site of the old TECO dam. The old Tampa Waterworks Company is abandoned.

The River Today

The Hillsborough river is home to many endangered species and several large bird rookeries exist. When local students reach sixth grade in Hillsborough County, they take a visit to the river for one to three days to learn about the ecosystem, watershed, and native Florida animals at a place called 'Natures Classroom'. The Hillsborough River dam (originally built in 1895 and since rebuilt) at Rowlett Park allows for the supply water for the City of Tampa.

SWFWMD and Tampa Bay Water erroneously refer to the river immediately above the dam as "a reservoir", when in reality, it is still the Hillsborough River. Currently, Tampa discharges 50 million barrels (7,900,000 m^{3}) of the used water it gets from the river above the dam back into Tampa Bay, which is causing problems for flora and fauna of the Bay. Many are now pushing for Tampa, Temple Terrace, and the county to use only reclaimed water for their irrigation needs, thus greatly diminishing the water that they draw from the river. The river above the dam to roughly the 56th Street bridge passes through the neighborhood of Temple Crest. The river above the 56th Street bridge passes through the City of Temple Terrace and it is one of the more scenic portions of the river, the city has a river cleanup of their river portion twice a year. The City of Temple Terrace is currently battling SWFWMD for a minimum flow study for the middle river, similar to the study done for the lower river in 2007. The watershed area is trying to wean its over-reliance on water from the river by constructing a desalination plant and using more reclaimed water. Currently, Tampa is only using reclaimed water in limited areas of South Tampa, it is rumored that this water is not filtered well and contains salts that are detrimental to some plants, decreasing the desirability of the reclaimed water.

The Hillsborough River was immortalized in 1973 by author Gloria Jahoda in her book "River of the Golden Ibis".

== The Middle River ==
The middle river, that being the portion north of the Tampa's Water Works Dam at 30th Street, is commonly referred to as the reservoir because it holds the drinking water for the city of Tampa. Nevertheless, it is still a part of the larger Hillsborough River which begins in the Green Swamp and flows to Tampa Bay.

Water was supplied in Tampa's early days by private wells, cisterns and tanks. Tampa's first water plant went into operation on April 20, 1899, operated by the private Tampa Waterworks Company. It pumped well water to supply the City of Tampa until March 6, 1923, when the people voted to purchase the Waterworks plant for the city.

The middle river has been Tampa's official source of water since 1944. It is about 1,300 acres (5 km^{2}) in size and can support about 1.6 billion US gallons (6,100,000 m^{3}) of water. The Hillsborough River flooded frequently until the Tampa Bypass Canal and the Harney Canal were built, allowing excess upstream water to flow away from urban areas into the canals and to McKay Bay.

The middle Hillsborough River is a diverse ecosystem within the larger urban area surrounding it. Orange Lake, in the Temple Crest neighborhood, is an Audubon Society bird nesting and sanctuary, is also a living wetlands. However, the Southwest Florida Water Management District has done little to maintain minimum water levels, instead taking water that would normally flow into the river from the Green Swamp, siphoning the water into the Bypass Canal, which send millions of gallons to the Bill Young Reservoir in south Hillsborough County. Because of these policies wildlife is disappearing and dead zones are beginning to appear along the river's shores. Without intervention, establishing minimum healthy water levels and flows, the middle Hillsborough River will continue to deteriorate.

== Education ==
Temple Crest is served by Hillsborough County Public Schools.

== See also ==
- Neighborhoods in Tampa, Florida
