= 1757 Tampa expedition =

Spanish Royal Navy exploration in Florida

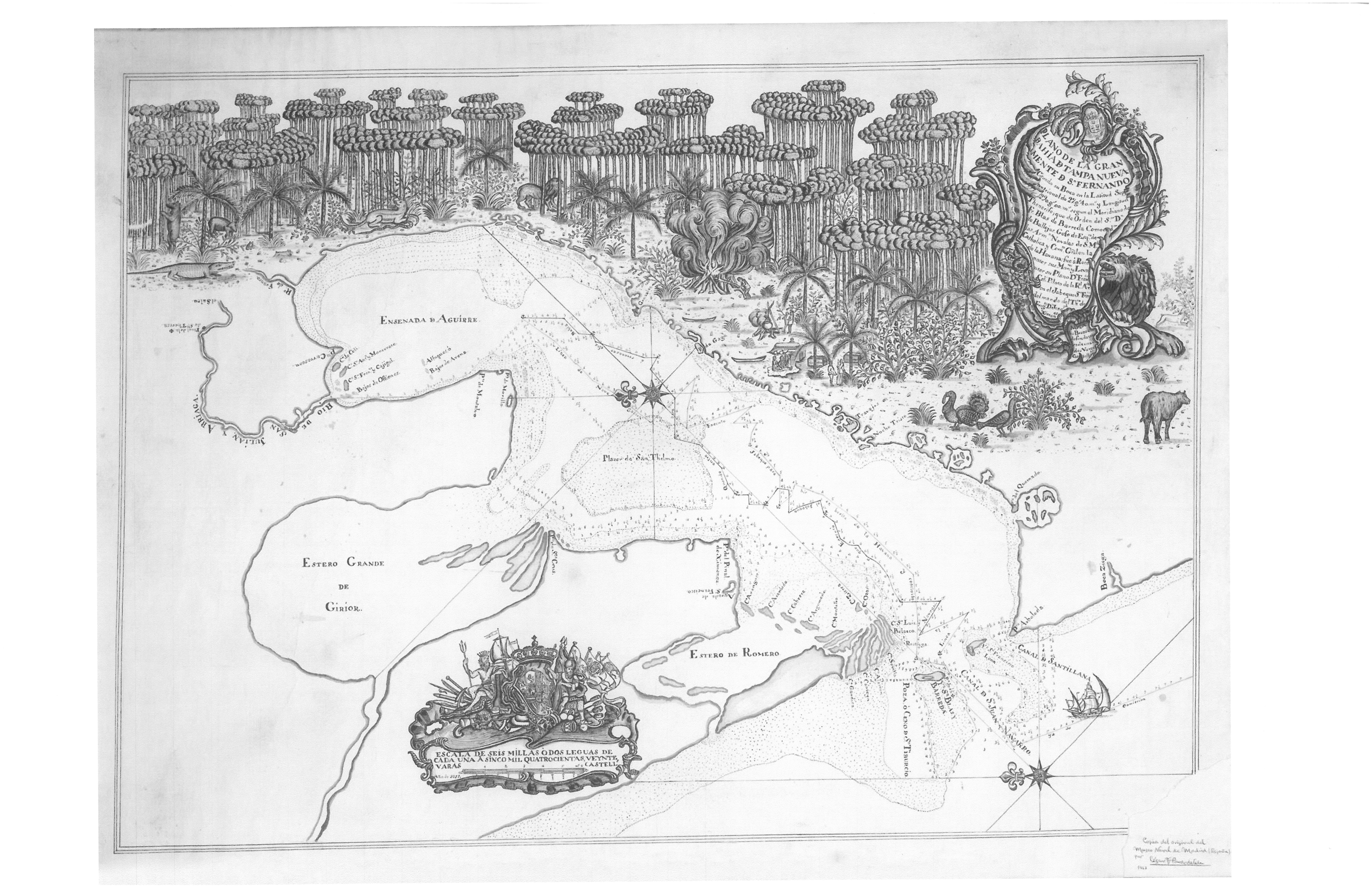
The earliest known map of the Tampa Bay area by Don Francisco Maria Celi of the Spanish Royal Fleet, 1757, The river on the upper left of the map is the Hillsborough, and the area designated as "El Pinal de la Cruz de Santa Teresa" is today in Temple Terrace. "El Salto" are the rapids at Hillsborough River State Park. The map is oriented so that east is to the top.

The 1757 Tampa expedition was an exploration into Tampa Bay and up the Hillsborough River led by Spanish Royal Navy captain Don Francisco Maria Celi. Documents produced during the trip include the first European-drawn map of the Tampa Bay, Florida area and a log book. The journey followed more than 200 years after Spanish Explorer Pánfilo de Narváez landed near Tampa Bay with 400 men in 1528.

== History ==
In April 1757, Spanish explorer Don Francisco Maria Celi documented a trip into Tampa Bay and up the Hillsborough River. Celi's expedition came to Tampa Bay from Cuba. The party he led up the Hillsborough River was seeking pine trees suitable for use as masts on his ships. The expedition was for the Spanish Royal Navy.

Celi reportedly erected a cross at a site he named el Pinal de la Cruz de Santa Teresa (the Pine Forest of the Cross of Saint Theresa). The site is now part of Riverhills Park in Temple Terrace, Florida. He continued upriver as far as the rapids that are now part of Hillsborough River State Park.

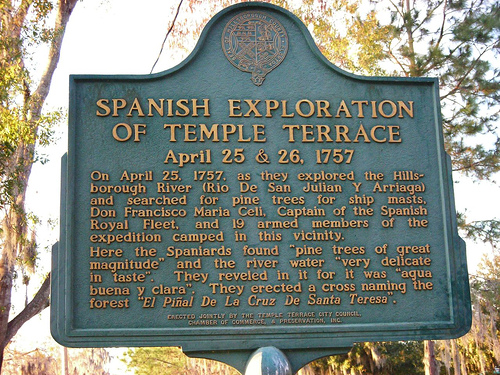
Historical marker

Celi's log book and surveying documentation of the area are the first we have of the area going back 200 years prior. He kept a survey journal and logbook of the expedition. A copy of the map made on the trip is held by the South Florida History Museum and the original is in the Museo Naval de Madrid in Spain.

== Temple Terrace site ==
The area of longleaf pine, sand live oak, and cypress trees made the area suitable for turpentine manufacturing and logging until 1913. Eventually, Riverhills Park was established, and a historical marker commemorating the expedition put up along with a replica of the cross.
