= Tampa Bypass Canal =

River in the United States of America

Coordinates: 27.942°N 82.414°W

The Tampa Bypass Canal and Palm River are a 14-mile-long (23 km) flood bypass operated by the Southwest Florida Water Management District. The canal includes several concrete flood control structures and was constructed during the 1960s and 1970s. Its purpose is to redirect flood waters from large amounts of rainfall from the Hillsborough River to Tampa Bay to prevent floodwaters reaching homes and businesses. Despite its original purpose it is now used as a drinking water source for the City of Tampa. During construction of the canal the Floridan aquifer was accidentally breached.

When there is a large amount of rainfall and flooding is expected, this structure redirects the rising waters along the Hillsborough River into the constructed canal and down to McKay Bay. This protects homes and businesses in Temple Terrace and Tampa from flooding.

The Tampa Bypass Canal works together with the Lower Hillsborough Flood Detention Area, which is land owned by the District. This land provides an area for the storage and detention of overflow water from the Hillsborough River and the Tampa Bypass Canal. Because it is used for water overflow storage, there are no homes or businesses built here.

The land in the Lower Hillsborough Flood Detention Area represents a variety of natural habitats along portions of the Hillsborough River and the connecting floodplain areas. Habitats include river swamps with cypress trees and hardwoods, cabbage palms and oak hammocks, and some areas of pine lands and palmetto prairies. As one of the largest undeveloped areas in Hillsborough County, this area is managed for its water resources and flood management functions. But it has also become a favorite recreational area and a regionally important wildlife area. It is used as a rowing venue for USRowing.
