= Hillsborough River (Florida) =

River in the United States of America

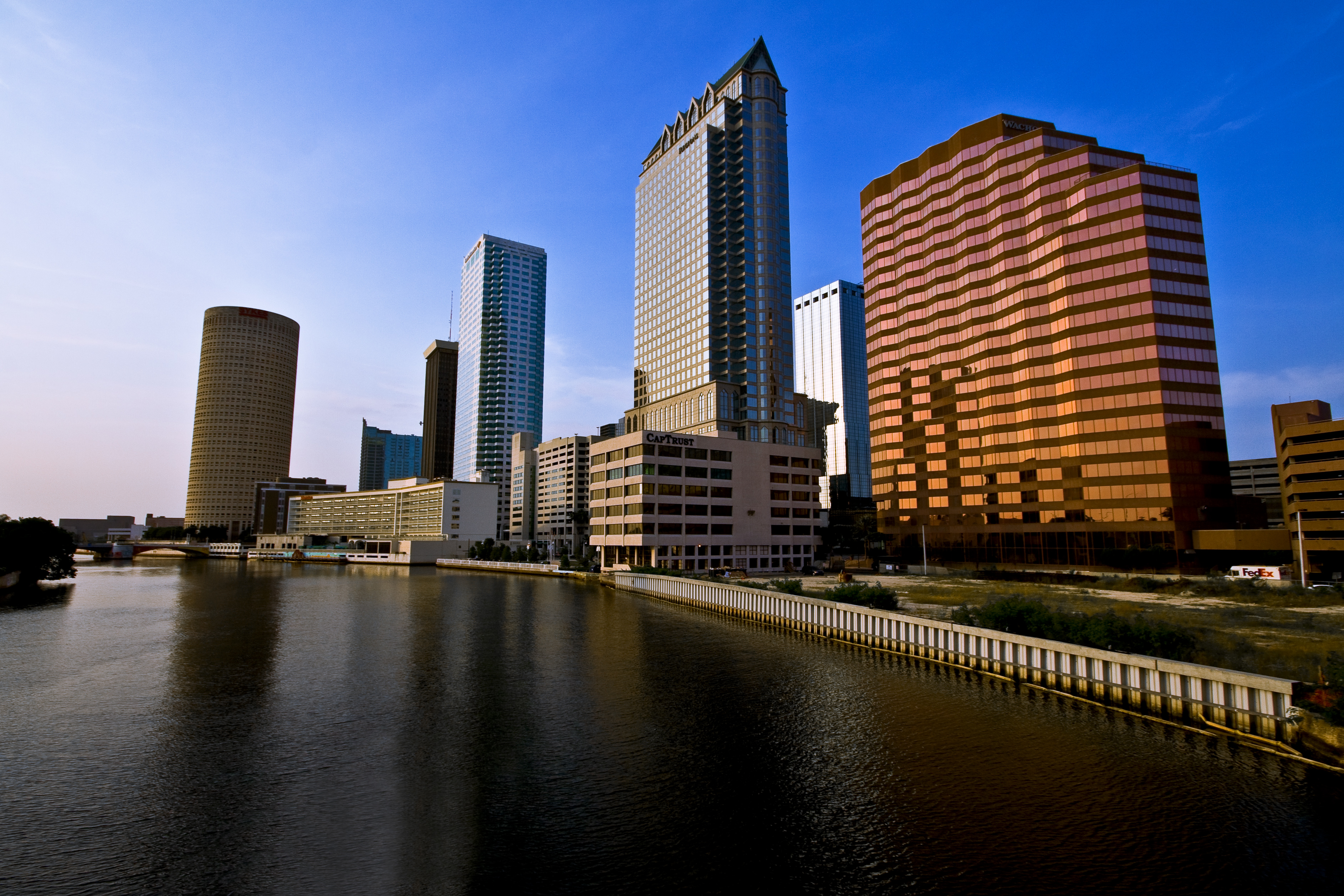

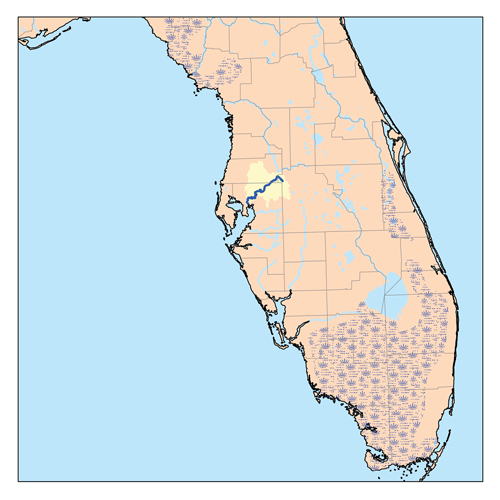
- Hillsborough River watershed

Location
- Country: United States
- State: Florida
- Counties: Pasco, Hillsborough
- District: SWFWMD
- Cities: Temple Terrace, Tampa

Physical characteristics
- Source: Green Swamp
  - location: Branchborough, Florida
  - coordinates: 28°16′28″N 82°05′38″W
- Mouth: Hillsborough Bay
  - location: Tampa, Florida
  - coordinates: 27°56′16″N 82°27′43″W
- Length: 60 mi (97 km)
- Basin size: 740 sq mi (1,900 km^{2})

Basin features
- Tributaries
  - left: Blackwater Creek, Flint Creek
  - right: New River

The Hillsborough River is a river located in the state of Florida in the United States. It arises in the Green Swamp near the juncture of Hillsborough, Pasco and Polk counties, and flows 60 miles (97 km) through Pasco and Hillsborough Counties to an outlet in the city of Tampa on Hillsborough Bay. The name Hillsborough River first appeared on a British map in 1769. At the time, the Earl of Hillsborough was the British Secretary of State for the Colonies, and thus controlled the pensions of the surveyors working in the American colonies, which included East Florida.

== History ==
Geological data estimates that the Hillsborough River has been flowing for about 27,000 years. It is estimated humans first made their way to this area 12,000 - 15,000 years ago.

In the late 18th century the watershed of the Hillsborough River was a land covered by a rich, old-growth forest. Bald cypress trees grew up several hundred feet into the air, and some were more than 3,000 years old. In the mid to late 18th, 19th and early 20th centuries the growth forests began to be logged, changing the ecosystem.

When Europeans first reached Florida, the area around Tampa Bay and all of the watershed of the Hillsborough River was occupied by people of the Safety Harbor culture. Two chiefdoms of the Safety Harbor culture, Mocoso and Pohoy, were adjacent to where the Hillsborough River entered Tampa Bay. Hernando de Soto landed on the south side of Tampa Bay in 1539 and passed through Mocoso on his way north. By the early 18th century the people of the Safety Harbor culture, through disease and slavery, are nearly exterminated.

=== Timeline ===
(1757) A survey of the Hillsborough River is done by Don Francisco Maria Celi, pilot of the Spanish Royal Fleet. He ventures up to the Temple Terrace area in search of longleaf pine to use as masts for his ships. He names the pine forest of the area "El Pinal de la Cruz de Santa Teresa" or "The Pines of the Cross of Saint Teresa". There is a plaque commemorating his exploration at Riverhills Park in Temple Terrace.

(1772) A map drawn and sent to the Earl of Hillsborough, English Governor of West Florida, shows the river named as the Hillsborough. During the mid and late 18th century, Native Americans from the north, mostly Creek, begin to migrate to Florida. These immigrants become known as Seminoles.

(1824) Construction of Fort Brooke begins at the mouth of the Hillsborough River.

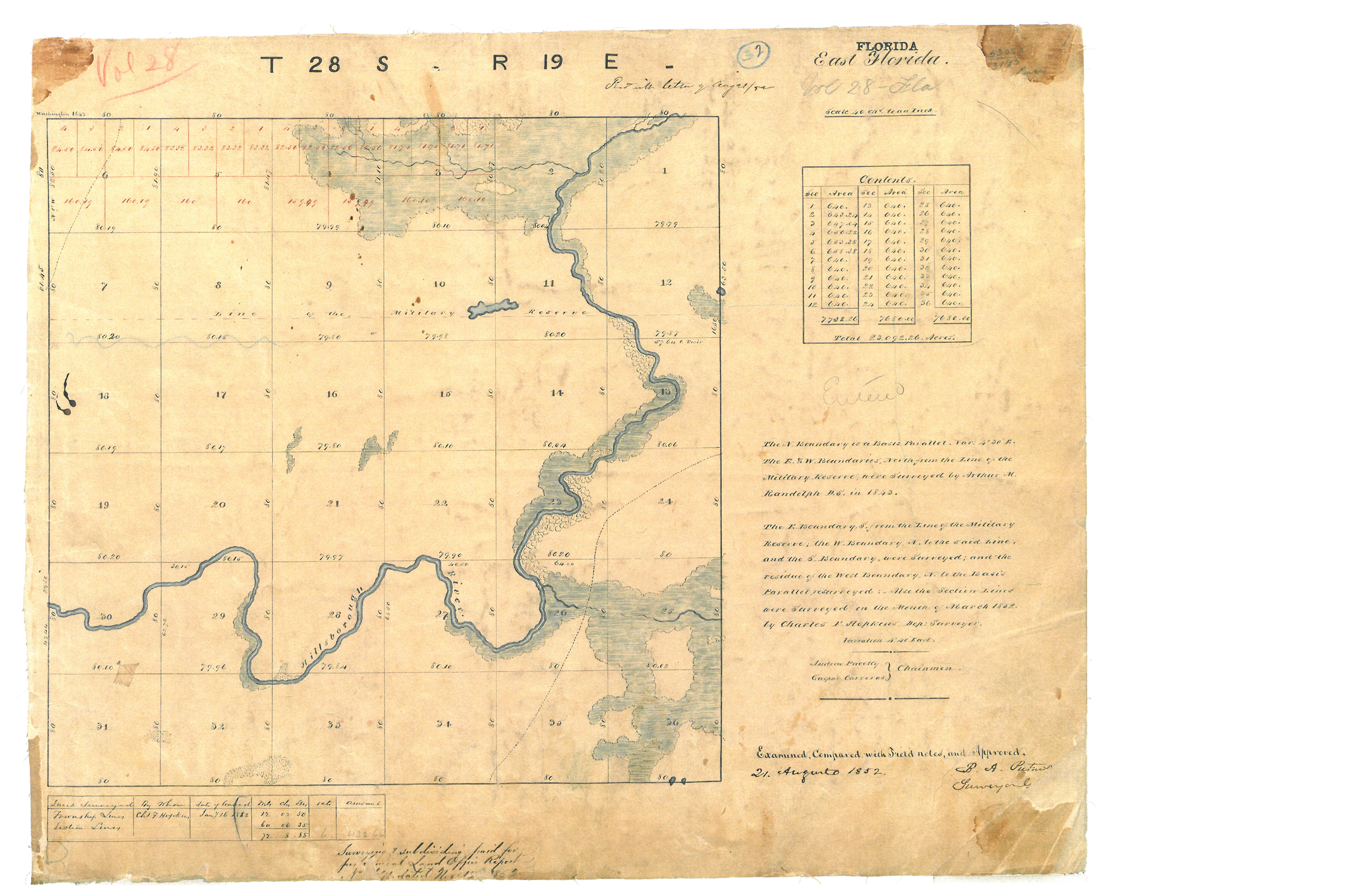
Survey of the middle Hillsborough River in 1843

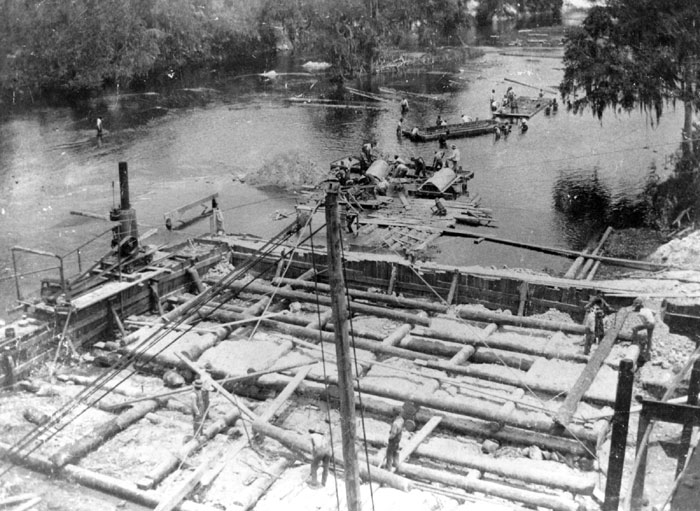
The original dam under construction in 1897

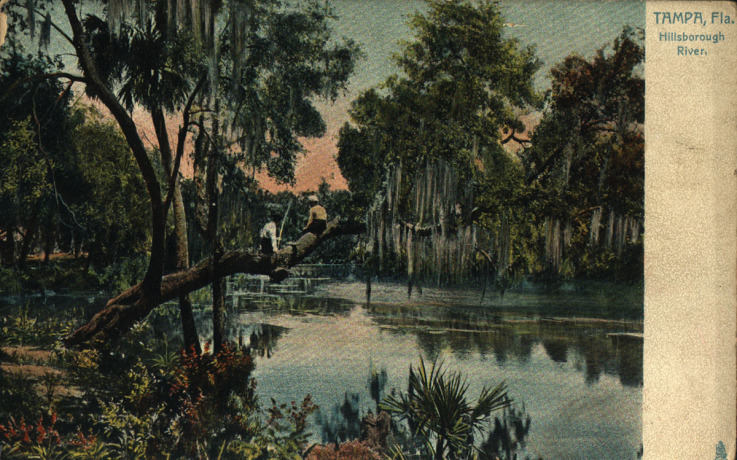
Postcard view of the Hillsborough River in 1910

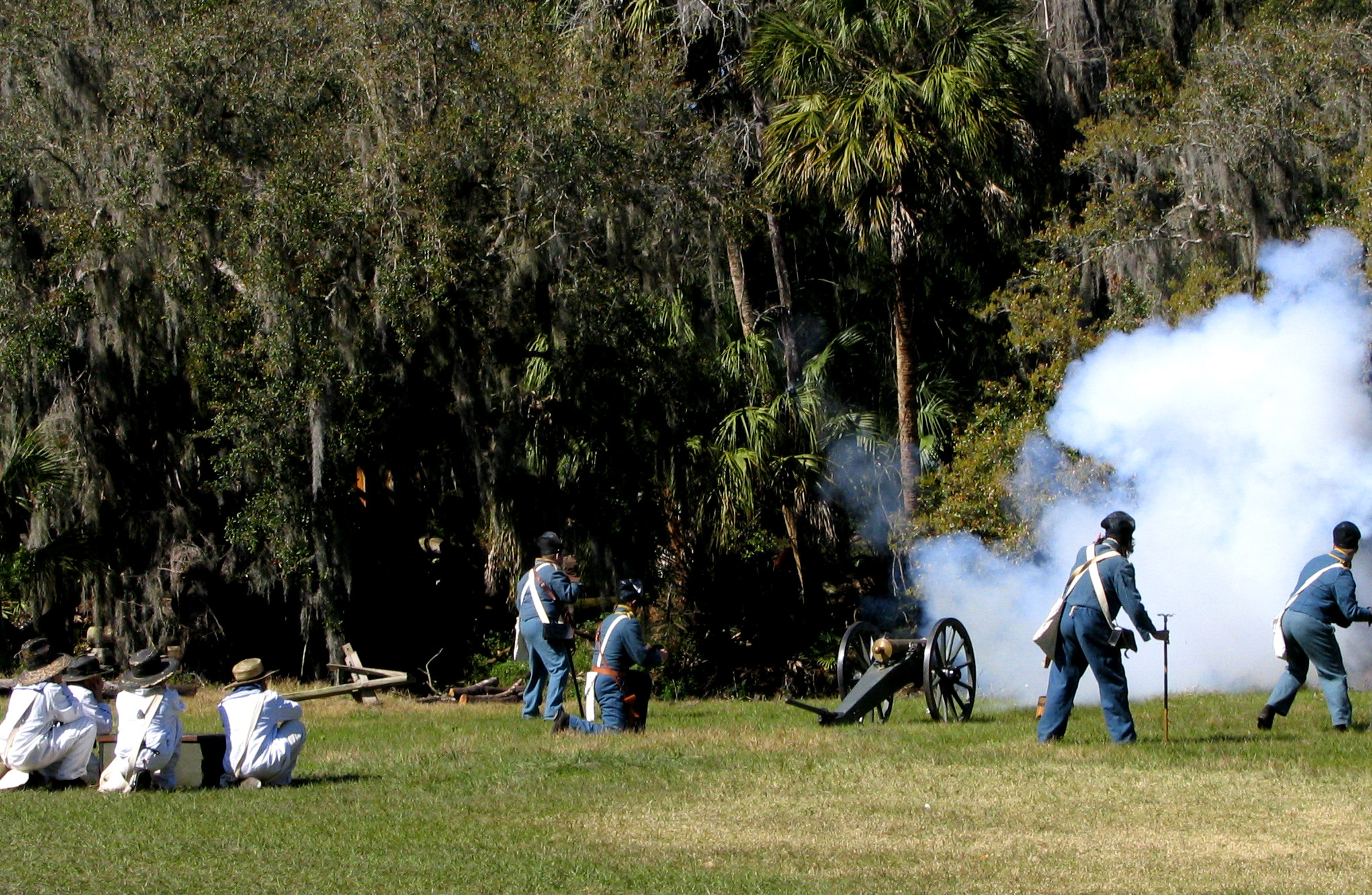
Seminole War reenactors at Hillsborough River State Park

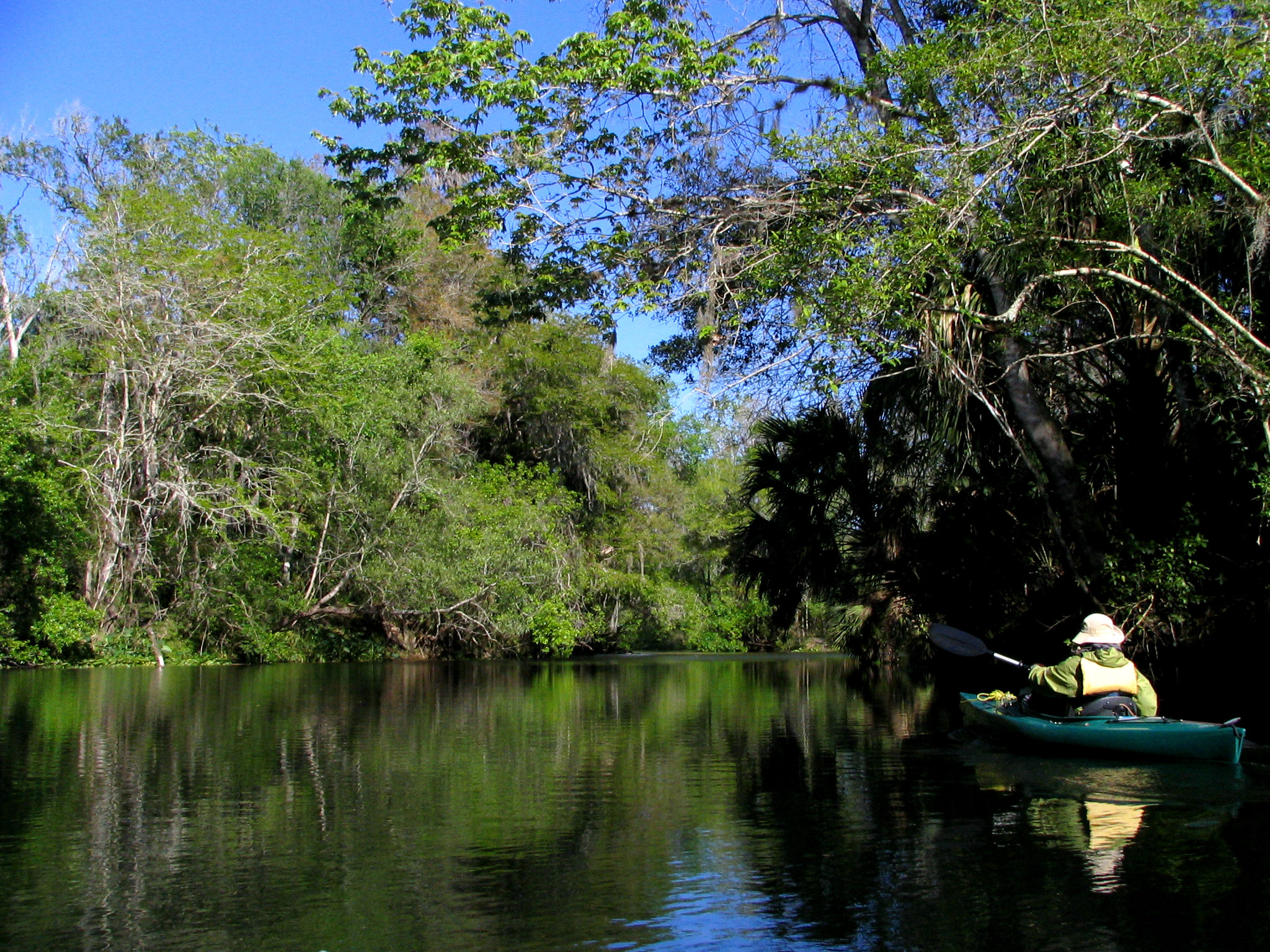
Paddling on the Hillsborough River

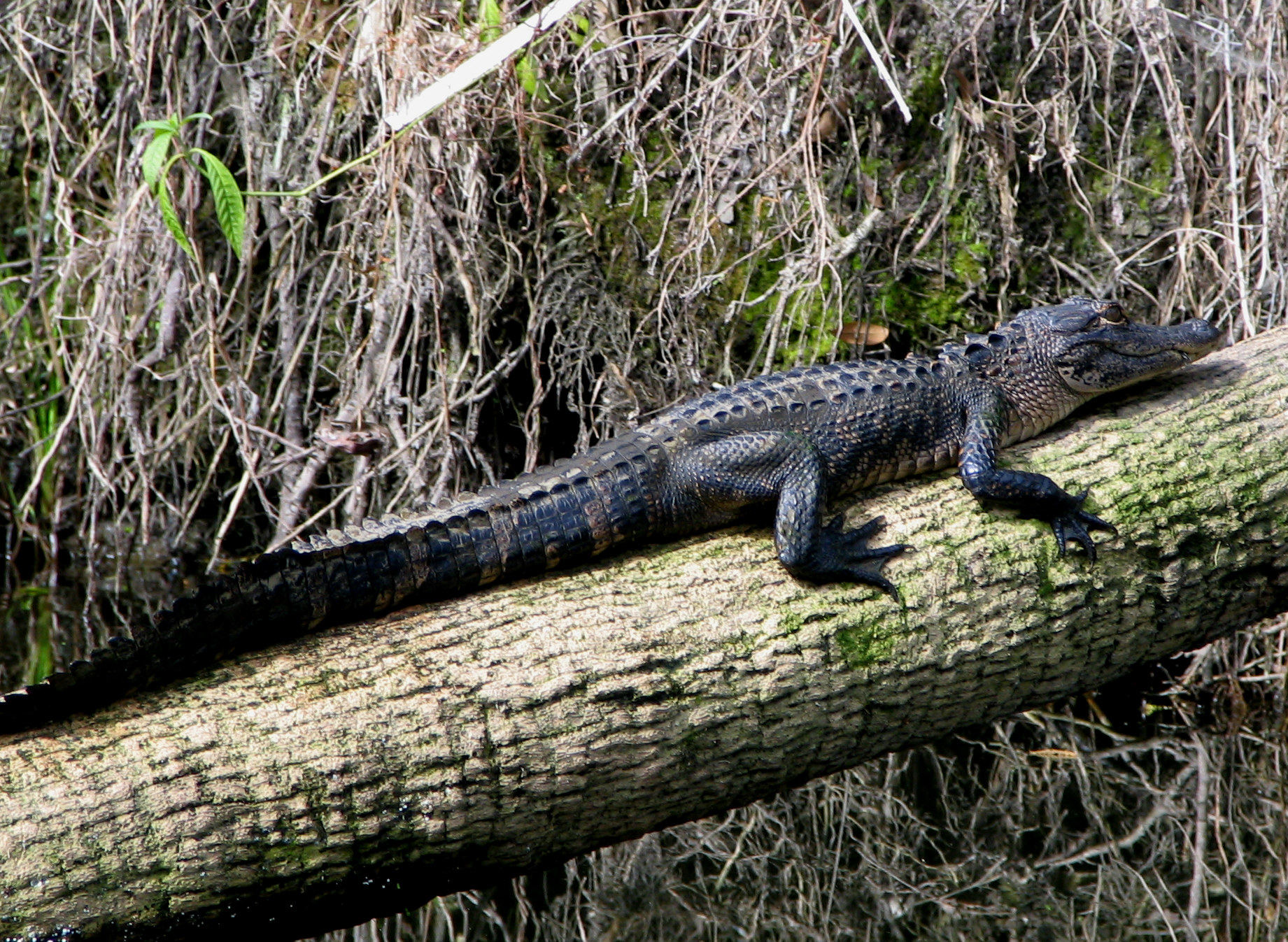
An Alligator snoozing in the sun

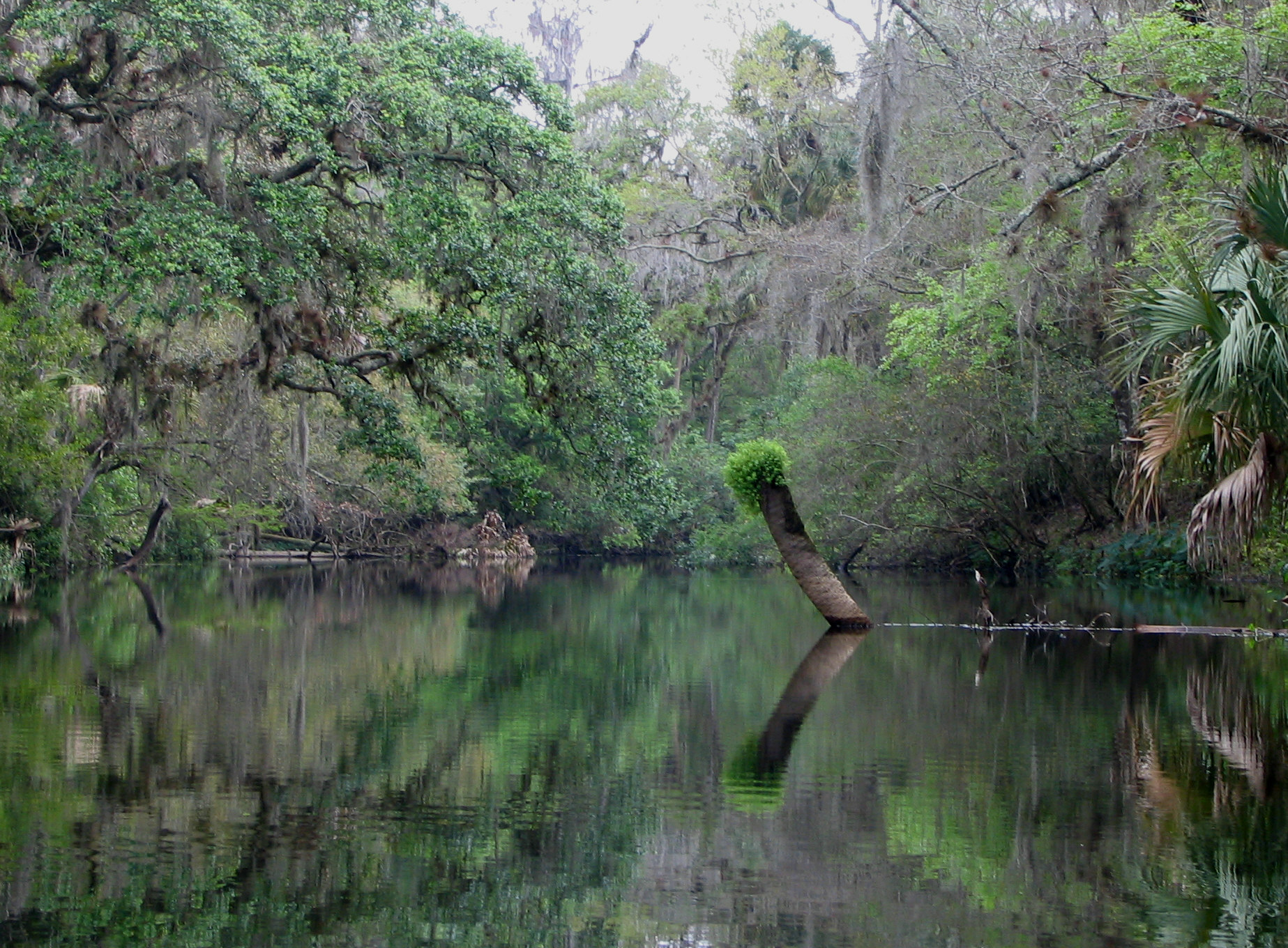
Paddling the Hillsborough River

(1828) The Fort King Military Road (now State Road 41) is built to connect Fort King in Ocala with Fort Brooke in what was then the settlement of Tampa. A bridge is built to cross the Hillsborough.

(1830) Congress passes the Indian Removal Act. The American government begins efforts to remove the Seminole from Tampa Bay and relocate them to a reservation west of the Mississippi. Tensions between Seminole and Americans continue.

(1835) Seminoles burn the bridge at the Fort King Road's river crossing. Conflict continues.

(1836) Fort Foster is established at the Hillsborough River crossing to protect this strategically advantageous position.

(1843) The Jean Street Shipyard is founded on the Hillsborough River in what will be the neighborhood of Seminole Heights.

(1846) The first ferry crossing on the Hillsborough River is established. This improves transportation and widens the growth of Tampa to both sides of the river.

(1861) During the American Civil War, Tampa Bay is blockaded by federal troops to prevent goods from leaving Tampa or from coming into Tampa.

(1863) Federal troops march upriver to a location near the present day site of Lowry Park Zoo. There they discover a blockade-running steamer and sloop loaded with cotton. The ships are burned. The skirmish that follows is the only Civil War action on the Hillsborough River.

(1897) At a cost of $150,000 an electrical dam is built on the river by Consumers Electric Light and Street Railway Company. The dam was located halfway between present-day 40th Street and 56th Street on the Hillsborough River (today's Temple Crest neighborhood.)

(1898) On December 13, 1898 the dam is dynamited by cattle barons angry at the loss of grazing land. They tried three times. The first on January 8, 1897, shortly after construction was completed. When the water is low, remnants of the dynamited dam can be seen.

(1898–99) TECO buys the Consumers Electric Light and Street Railway Company and builds a new electric generating dam downstream of the current site north of Sulphur Springs.

(1899) Tampa's first water plant is built by the private Tampa Waterworks Company. It pumped well water to supply the City of Tampa until March 6, 1923, when the people voted to purchase the Waterworks plant.

(1900) The Sulphur Springs (Sulphur Springs, Tampa, Florida) property is developed and open to the public.

(1910) Hillsborough Bay is channelized to the mouth of the Hillsborough River with the Rivers and Harbors Act of 1899. Up to 1913 the Hillsborough River watershed is heavily logged for its valuable cypress, longleaf pine and oak.

(1911–1914) Bertha Potter Palmer (Bertha Palmer) (of Chicago and Sarasota) completes purchases of 19,000 acres (77 km^{2}) bordering the Hillsborough River in present-day Temple Terrace, Temple Crest, Terrace Park, Busch Gardens and the University of South Florida area. She calls her property "Riverhills Ranch", an exclusive hunting preserve where she builds a lodge and guest houses among other structures. She dies in 1918.

(1922) The Temple Terrace Golf and County Club, located on the river in Temple Terrace opens with a Washington Ball.

(1923) The city of Tampa builds a water treatment plant to utilize the water supply from the water above the dam.

(1933) In a torrential 24-hour rain, floods wash away the Tampa Electric dam. TECO does not rebuild the dam and turns to other locations for electrical generating plants.

(1935) Hillsborough River State Park is opened.

(1944) The city of Tampa completes construction on the current dam, to be used for the purpose of containing drinking water for the city, at the site of the old TECO dam. The old Tampa Waterworks Company is abandoned.

(1961) The Southwest Florida Water Management District (SWFWMD) is created.

(1960s-70s) The 14-mile (23 km) long Tampa Bypass Canal is constructed by the Southwest Florida Water Management District (SWFWMD). It includes a constructed canal and several concrete flood-control structures. During construction of the Tampa Bypass Canal the aquifer is accidentally breached.

(1979) The Hillsborough River is closed to swimming at Hillsborough River State Park and a swimming pool is built for public use.

(1982) Lettuce Lake Park opens on the river just north of Temple Terrace.

(1986) The Hillsborough River Interlocal Planning Board & Technical Advisory Council is established. Sulphur Springs pool (Sulphur Springs, Tampa, Florida) is closed.

(1988) The annual Hillsborough River Cleanup begins.

(1991) Canoe Escape is opened and the owners donate canoes and time to bring the Hillsborough River to the public's attention.

(1992) The Hillsborough River Greenways Taskforce is established.

(1995) The Hillsborough River is designated as Outstanding Florida Waters. The Hillsborough River is designated as a Florida Recreational Canoe Trail. The Hillsborough River is named a Florida Sesquicentennial Greenway.

(1999) "Friends of the River" is created by local residents for the purpose of challenging the SWFWMD minimum flow of 10 cu ft/s (0.28 m^{3}/s) of Sulphur Springs water alone for the river's only freshwater flow.

(2000) On the day after a massive Earth Day celebration at Lowry Park, highlighted by a "Flow-tilla" of dozens of boats from the Rowlett Park dam to Lowry Park, Friends of the River settles its legal challenge with agreement with SWFWMD, City of Tampa and Robert Thomas of Zephyrhills Water to study the river for 5 years to scientifically determine exactly how much freshwater is needed to restore and maintain the river's estuarine function. Friends of the River had maintained that the establishment of the minimum flow of 10 cu ft/s (0.28 m^{3}/s) of Sulphur Springs water was a politically expedient solution with no basis in scientific data. Findings of the 5-year study to be used by SWFWMD as sole basis for modification of minimum flow.

(2002) Tampa Bay Water places a pipeline to the Morris Bridge Sink.

(2006) "The Hillsborough River Task Force", Temple Terrace, is created.

(2007) Alan Wright, "Mr River", dies of cancer, December 21. "The Lower Hillsborough River Minimum Flow Recovery Strategy" is adopted, based upon SWFWMD's 5-year study that documented a need for freshwater over twice that provided by its original rule as challenged by Friends of the River. A minimum flow of 20 cu ft/s (0.57 m^{3}/s) is adopted, combining the original 10 cu ft/s (0.28 m^{3}/s) of Sulphur Springs water with 10 cu ft/s (0.28 m^{3}/s) added to the river from water stored in Tampa Bypass Canal. Minimum flow adjusted upwards to 24 cu ft/s (0.68 m^{3}/s) in spring months (April, May, June) when fish spawning activity occurs in restored estuary. Daily minimum flow begins December 31, 2007.

== The river today ==
The Hillsborough River is home to many species, and several large bird rookeries exist. When local students reach sixth grade in Hillsborough County, they take a visit to the river for one to three days to learn about the ecosystem, watershed, and native Florida animals at a place called 'Nature's Classroom'. The Hillsborough River dam (originally built in 1895 and since rebuilt) at Rowlett Park creates a lake covering 1,300 acres (5 km^{2}) and containing 1.6 billion US gallons (6,100,000 m^{3}) of water, providing for the supply of water for the City of Tampa. The Hillsborough River was immortalized in 1973 by author Gloria Jahoda in her book River of the Golden Ibis.

With the construction of the dam in 1945, the portion of the river above the dam to approximately Fletcher Avenue is where the City of Tampa is permitted to withdraw water to supply to its citizens and those in Hillsborough County. In addition, Tampa Bay Water is permitted to withdraw water from the river during "high flow" times and under specific conditions. The Southwest Florida Water Management District, the agency required by Florida law to protect and manage the waters in the state, authorizes the permits.

With the establishment of the minimum flow of the upper and middle river by the Southwest Florida Water Management District in 2007 and its supporting Recovery Strategy, the City of Tampa and the District in partnership are implementing measures and projects to achieve the required flow in the lower river, while preserving the pristine nature of the middle and upper rivers.

The river above the dam to roughly the 56th Street bridge passes through the neighborhood of Temple Crest. The river above the 56th Street bridge passes through the City of Temple Terrace and it is one of the many scenic portions of the river. The City has a river cleanup of its river portion twice a year.

== Hillsborough River State Park ==
Hillsborough River State Park includes 2,990 acres (12 km^{2}) along the Hillsborough River in northeastern Hillsborough County. It supports many Floridian environments such as swamps and oak hammocks and many endangered species. The park's purpose is to preserve the "real Florida". Visitors to the park can participate in picnicking, camping, canoeing, hiking, fishing and swimming in a constructed pool. There is also a designated place to observe the river's class II rapids. It is one of the only rivers in Florida with rapids. The park opened in 1935 making it one of Florida's oldest state parks.

== The middle river ==
The middle river is the portion of the river north of the dam at 30th Street and is the primary source of water for the City of Tampa. The middle river is located in the middle portion of the river extending from its dam with the water contained back to Fletcher Avenue. The Hillsborough River has its headwaters begins in the Green Swamp and ultimately flows into Tampa Bay.

Water was supplied in Tampa's early days by private wells, cisterns and tanks. Tampa's first water plant went into operation on April 20, 1899, operated by the private Tampa Waterworks Company. It pumped well water to supply the City of Tampa until March 6, 1923, when the people voted to purchase the Waterworks plant for the city. The middle river has been Tampa's official source of water since 1944.

But the middle river is far more than just the source for some of Tampa's drinking water, it is a wonderfully diverse river ecosystem within the larger urban area surrounding it. Orange Lake, in the Temple Crest neighborhood, is an Audubon Society bird nesting and sanctuary, is also a living wetlands.

Upstream along the banks of Temple Terrace's Riverhills Park is a scene from old Florida, with cypress trees dotting the watery landscape.

== Recreation ==
A 34.5-mile (55.5 km) canoe trail is designated by the State of Florida, starting at Hillsborough River State Park and ending at Rowlett Park in Tampa. Morris Bridge Park, Trout Creek Wilderness Park, Hillsborough River State Park Lettuce Lake Park, Riverfront Park, Riverhills Park, Angel of Hope Park, Rogers Park, Sulphur Springs Water Tower, and Rivercrest Park are all located along the Hillsborough River.

== List of crossings ==
Crossing	Carries	Image	Location	Coordinates
Headwaters				28°16′28″N 82°05′38″W
140024	US 98		Branchborough	28°16′18″N 82°05′53″W
140009	CR 54		Branchborough	28°15′33″N 82°06′18″W
CSX Rail Bridge	Vitis Subdivision			28°14′09″N 82°06′59″W
CSX Rail Bridge	Yeoman Subdivision			28°11′45″N 82°09′39″W
140007	SR 39; Buchman Highway		Corvilla	28°11′35″N 82°09′54″W
144002	Crystal Springs Road		Crystal Springs	28°11′09″N 82°11′03″W
Confluence with Blackwater Creek			Thonotosassa	28°09′03″N 82°12′56″W
Old Fort Bridge	Footbridge		Fort Foster	
Former ACL Railroad Bridge	Tampa and Thonotosassa Railroad		Fort Foster	
100434	US 301		Fort Foster	28°09′00″N 82°13′16″W
Confluence with New River			Hillsborough River; State Park	
Confluence with Flint Creek			Hillsborough River; State Park	28°04′58″N 82°17′07″W
Morris Bridge; 100026	CR 579; Morris Bridge Road		Pine Ridge Estates	28°05′55″N 82°18′41″W
Water control structure	Wilderness Conservation Park Main Trail		Temple Terrace	28°05′18″N 82°21′06″W
100387/100388	I-75		Temple Terrace	28°05′14″N 82°21′14″W
100276	CR 582A; Fletcher Avenue		Temple Terrace	28°04′09″N 82°22′38″W
100084/100402	SR 582; Fowler Avenue		Temple Terrace	28°03′15″N 82°21′51″W
104143/104144	SR 580; Temple Terrace Highway/Bullard Parkway		Temple Terrace	28°01′57″N 82°22′54″W
Tampa Bypass Canal			Temple Terrace	28°01′05″N 82°22′32″W
56th Street Bridge; 100267/100268	SR 583; N 56th Street		Temple Terrace	28°01′28″N 82°23′36″W
40th Street Bridge; 104504	CR 585A; N 40th Street		Del Rio	28°00′34″N 82°24′53″W
Hillsborough River Dam			Tampa	28°01′27″N 82°25′42″W
Rowlett Park Drive Bridge; 100086	Rowlett Park Drive		Tampa	28°01′19″N 82°26′06″W
CSX Rail Bridge	Clearwater Subdivision		Tampa	28°01′19″N 82°26′07″W
Former Van Dyke Street Bridge	Van Dyke Street (now North and South Van Dyke Place)		Tampa	
Nebraska Avenue Bridge; 100001	US 41; Nebraska Avenue		Tampa	28°01′12″N 82°27′04″W
100217/100218	I-275		Tampa	28°01′13″N 82°27′19″W
James N. Holmes Bridge; 100069	US 41 Bus. Florida Avenue		Tampa	28°01′16″N 82°27′34″W
Sumter L. Lowry Bridge; 105602	Sligh Avenue		Tampa	28°00′38″N 82°27′54″W
Hillsborough River Bridge (drawbridges) 100618/100920	US 92; Hillsborough Avenue		Tampa	27°59′46″N 82°27′56″W
Paul H. Smith Bridge; 100500	SR 574; Dr. Martin Luther King Jr. Boulevard		Tampa	27°58′53″N 82°28′32″W
Columbus Drive Swing Span; 105504	Columbus Drive		Tampa	27°58′00″N 82°28′30″W
Eugene Holtsinger Bridge; 105600	North Boulevard		Tampa	27°57′37″N 82°28′05″W
100135/100136	I-275		Tampa	27°57′23″N 82°27′52″W
Fortune Street Bridge (drawbridge); 105503	Laurel Street		Tampa	27°57′16″N 82°27′54″W
Cass Street Drawbridge; 105502	Cass Street		Tampa	27°57′01″N 82°27′54″W
CSX Rail Bridge	Port Tampa Spur		Tampa	27°57′00″N 82°27′54″W
Kennedy Drawbridge; 100100	SR 60; Kennedy Boulevard		Tampa	27°56′48″N 82°27′40″W
Brorein Street Drawbridge; 105501	Brorein Street		Tampa	27°56′36″N 82°27′32″W
Crosstown Viaduct; 100332/100333	SR 618; Lee Roy Selmon Expressway		Tampa	27°56′35″N 82°27′32″W
Platt Street Drawbridge; 105550	Platt Street		Tampa	27°56′30″N 82°27′30″W
Confluence with Seddon Channel and Garrison Channel			Tampa	27°56′26″N 82°27′30″W
Plant Street Bridge; 105606	Davis Boulevard; Plant Avenue		Tampa	27°56′17″N 82°27′42″W
Hyde Park Avenue Bridge; 105625	Davis Boulevard; Hyde Park Avenue		Tampa	27°56′13.8″N 82°27′44.2″W
Mouth				27°56′16″N 82°27′43″W
