= River of the Golden Ibis =

1973 book by Gloria Jahoda

- Author: Gloria Jahoda
- Genre: Non-fiction
- Publication date: 1973

River of the Golden Ibis is a book about the Hillsborough River in Florida by Gloria Jahoda. It was first published in 1973.

The book traces the river from its source at the Green Swamp through various habitats and historical events.

Publishers Weekly called it: "A colorful history of Tampa Bay, the Hillsborough River which flows into it, and the cities of Tampa and St. Petersburg, together with their smaller satellite communities", and Library Journal described it as "A beautifully written informal account of the Tampa Bay region."

Jahoda lived in Tallahassee, Florida, and authored The Other Florida, The Road to Samarkand, and the novels Annie and Delilah's Mountain. She died in 1980.
