= Lettuce Lake Park =

Park just outside the city limits of Tampa, Florida

Coordinates: 28°4′13″N 82°22′15″W

Lettuce Lake Park is a 240-acre (97 ha) Hillsborough County-run park just outside the city limits of Tampa, Florida. It is located on Fletcher Avenue between Interstate 75 and the University of South Florida. The Hillsborough River runs through it. The park opened in 1982.

Lettuce Lake Park features several boardwalks that wind through a variety Florida ecosystems; a fresh water wetland and flood plain, an oak-dominated hardwood forest, cypress domes, and the Hillsborough River. The park also contains a visitor center, an observation tower, nature trails, picnic tables, barbecue pits, restrooms, an open play field, and a playground.

More than half of the park lies in the Hillsborough River's natural floodplain and consists of hardwood swamp forest.

== Audubon Resource Center ==
The Audubon Resource Center at Lettuce Lake Park, also known as ARC in the Park, is operated by the Tampa Audubon Society in the visitor center. The center features natural history exhibits and wildlife native to the Hillsborough River watershed, and provides environmental education programs and field trips for all ages.

== Gallery ==
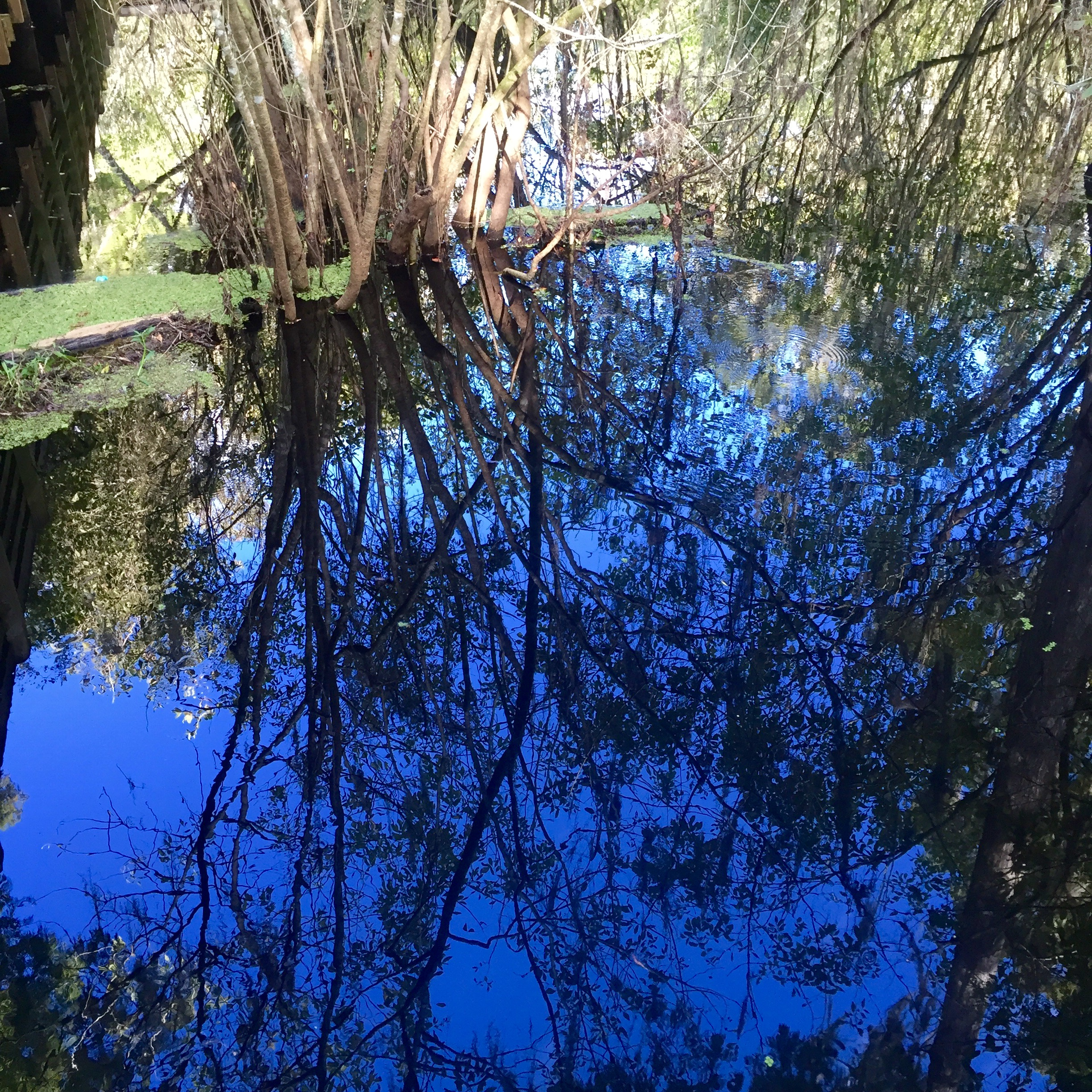

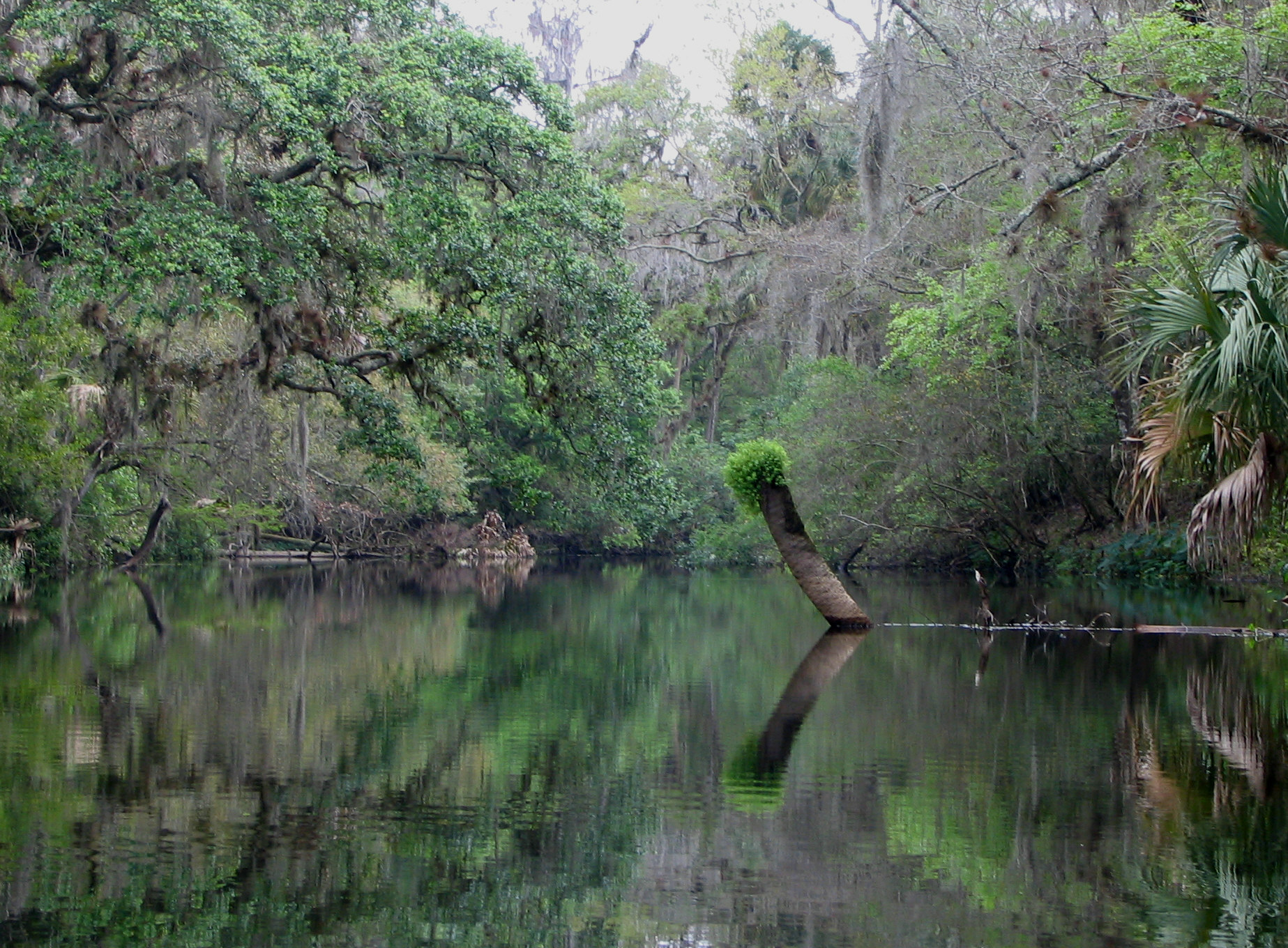

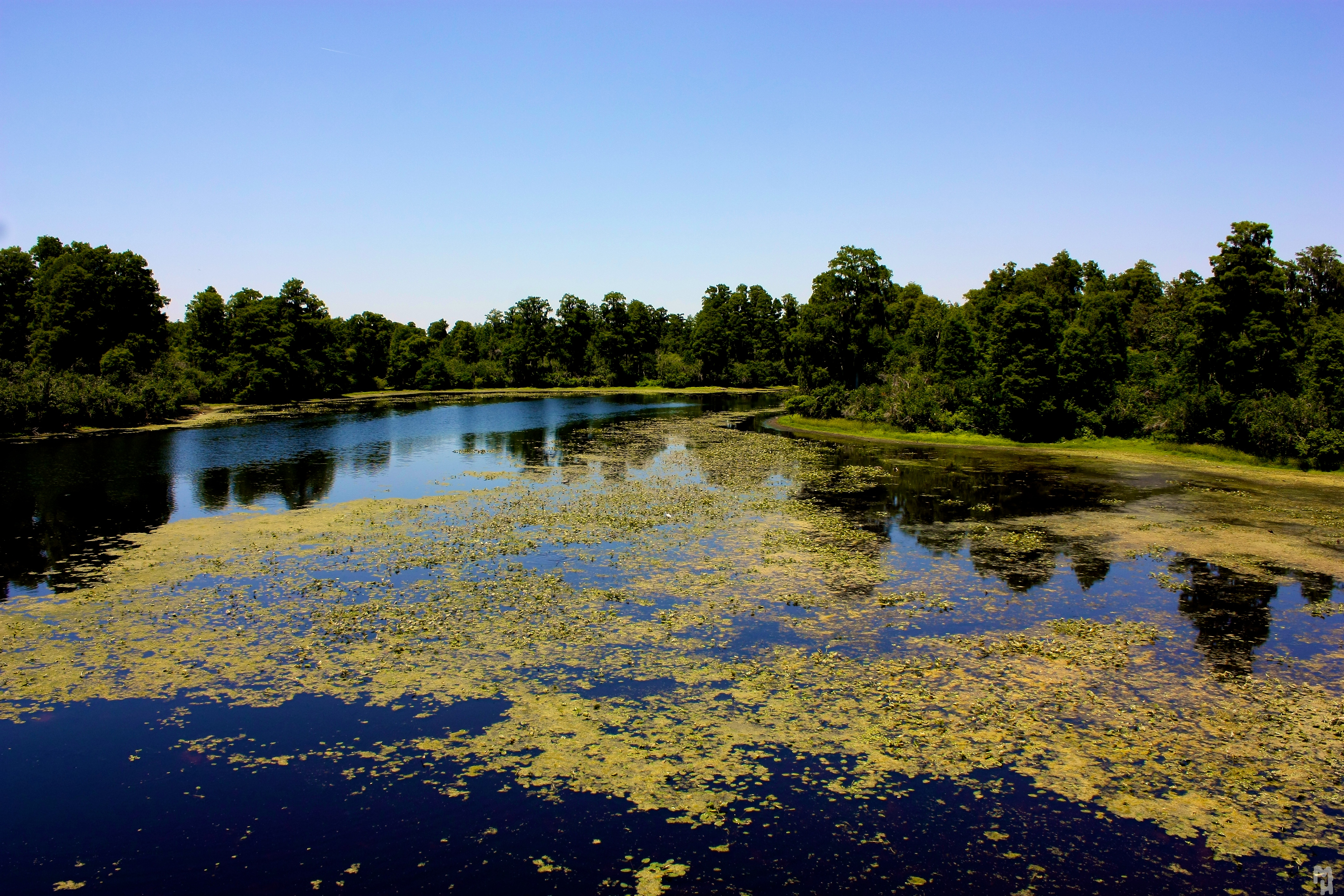
