= Temple Terrace, Florida =

City in Florida, US

- City
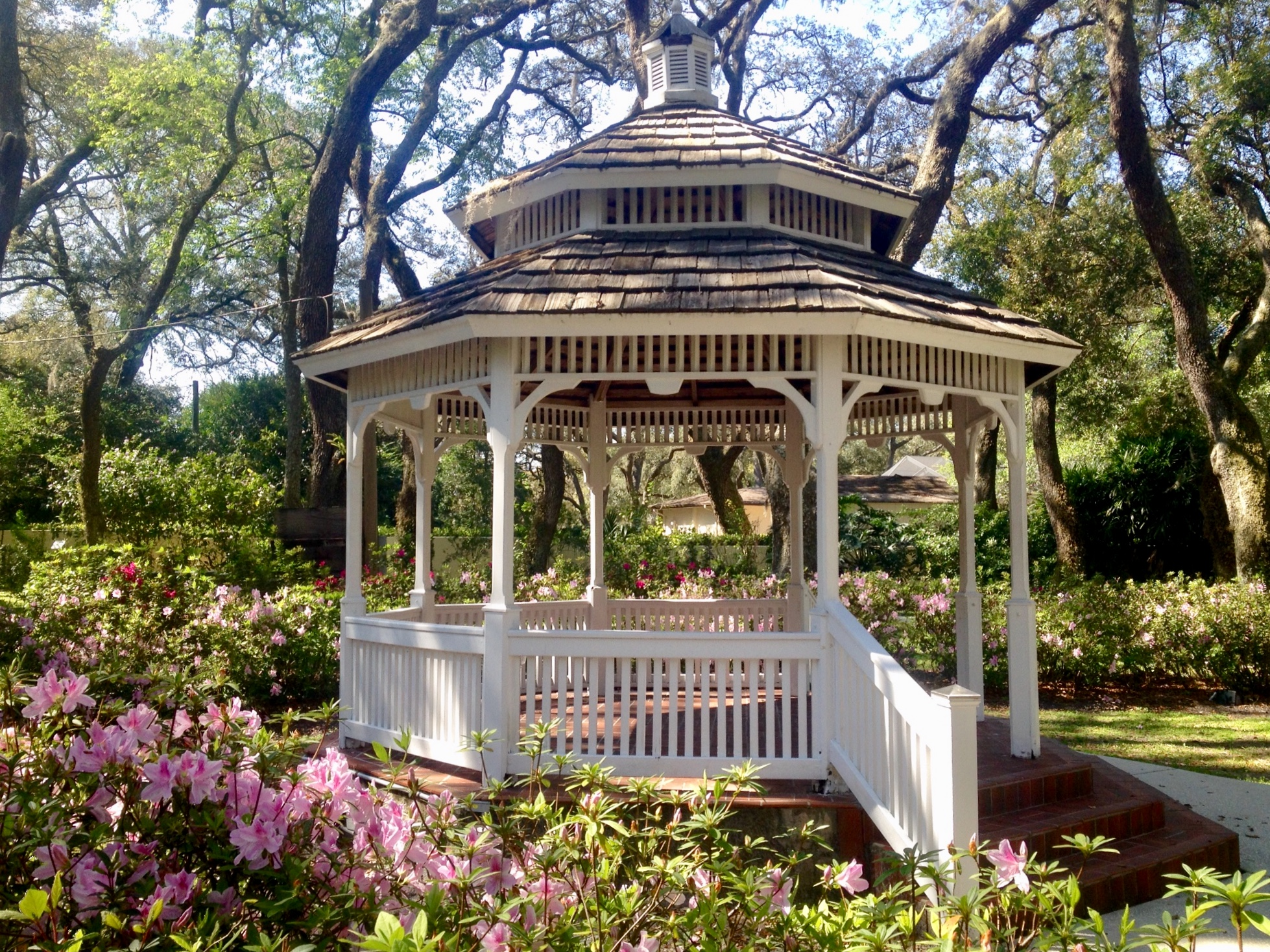
- Gazebo at Woodmont Park

- Logo
- Nickname: "The Terrace"
- Mottoes: "Amazing City, Since 1925" "Tree City USA"
- Location in Hillsborough County and the U.S. state of Florida
- Coordinates: 28°02′36″N 82°22′16″W
- Country: United States
- State: Florida
- County: Hillsborough
- Founded: 1920
- Incorporated: May 28, 1925

Government
  - Type: Council-Manager

Area
  - Total: 7.77 sq mi (20.13 km^{2})
  - Land: 7.47 sq mi (19.36 km^{2})
  - Water: 0.30 sq mi (0.77 km^{2})
- Elevation: 49 ft (15 m)

Population (2020)
  - Total: 26,690
  - Density: 3,570.5/sq mi (1,378.57/km^{2})
- Time zone: UTC-5 (Eastern (EST))
  - Summer (DST): UTC-4 (EDT)
- ZIP codes: 33617, 33637, (33687 P.O. Box)
- Area code: 813
- FIPS code: 12-71400
- GNIS feature ID: 2405577
- Website: www.templeterrace.gov

Temple Terrace is a city in northeastern Hillsborough County, Florida, United States, adjacent to Tampa. As of the 2020 census, the city had a population of 26,690. It is the third and smallest incorporated municipality in Hillsborough County, after Tampa and Plant City. Incorporated in 1925, the community is known for its rolling landscape, bucolic Hillsborough River views, and sand live oak trees; it is a Tree City USA. Originally planned in the 1920s as a Mediterranean-Revival golf course community, it is one of the first such communities in the United States. It is part of the Tampa–St. Petersburg–Clearwater Metropolitan Statistical Area, more commonly known as the Tampa Bay area.

Temple Terrace was named for the then-new hybrid, the Temple orange also called the tangor. It is a cross between the mandarin orange—also called the tangerine—and the common sweet orange; it was named after Florida-born William Chase Temple, one-time owner of the Pittsburgh Pirates, founder of the Temple Cup, and first president of the Florida Citrus Exchange. Temple Terrace was the first place in the United States where the new Temple orange was grown in large quantities. The "terrace" portion of the name refers to the terraced terrain of the area by the river where the city was founded. One of the original houses also had a terraced yard with a lawn sloping, in tiers, toward the river.

== History ==
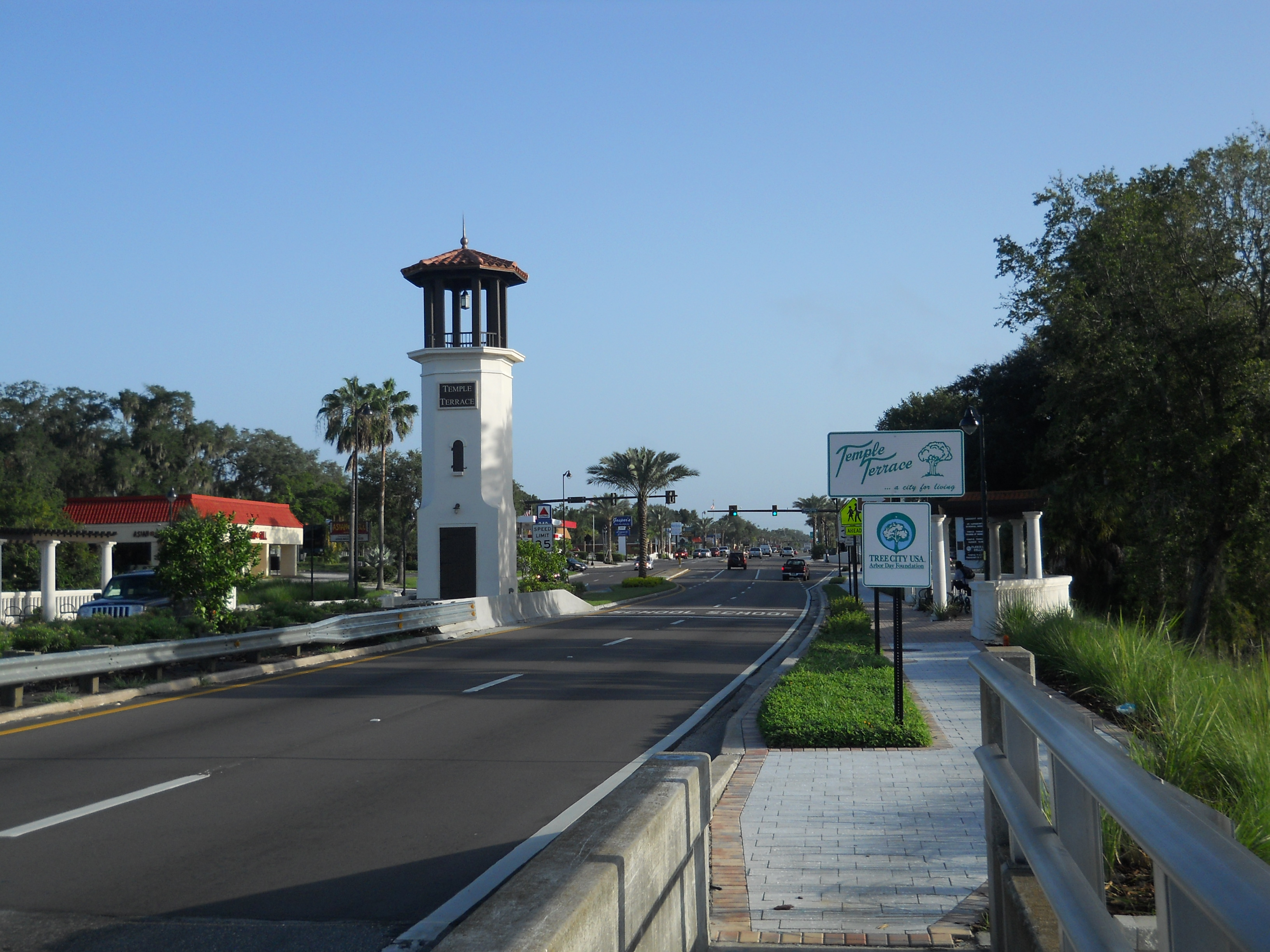
2011 Temple Terrace entry tower, 56th Street

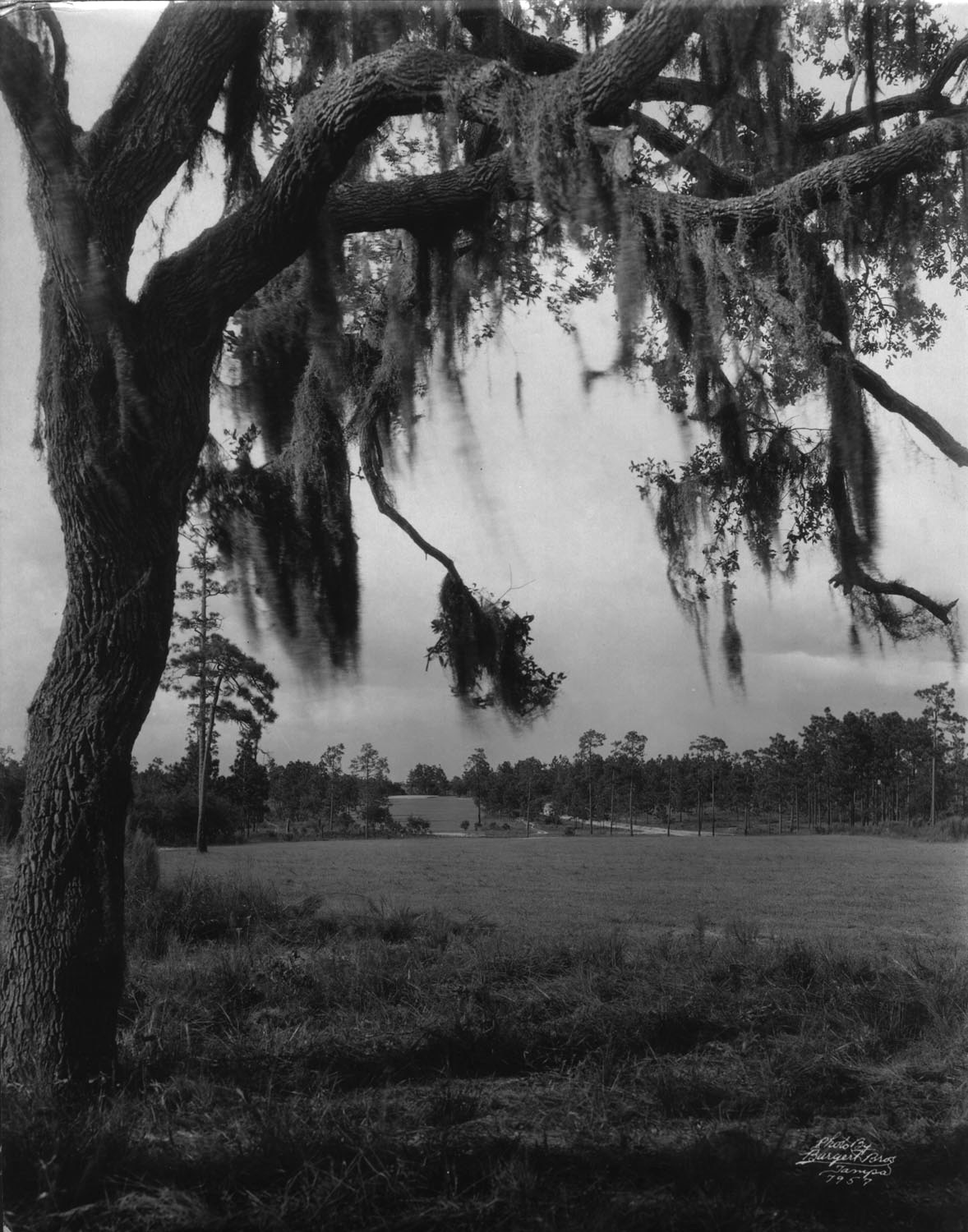
Rolling Temple Terrace landscape, photo circa 1923

Longleaf Pine forest: 1921 Burgert Brothers photo of Temple Terrace pre-development

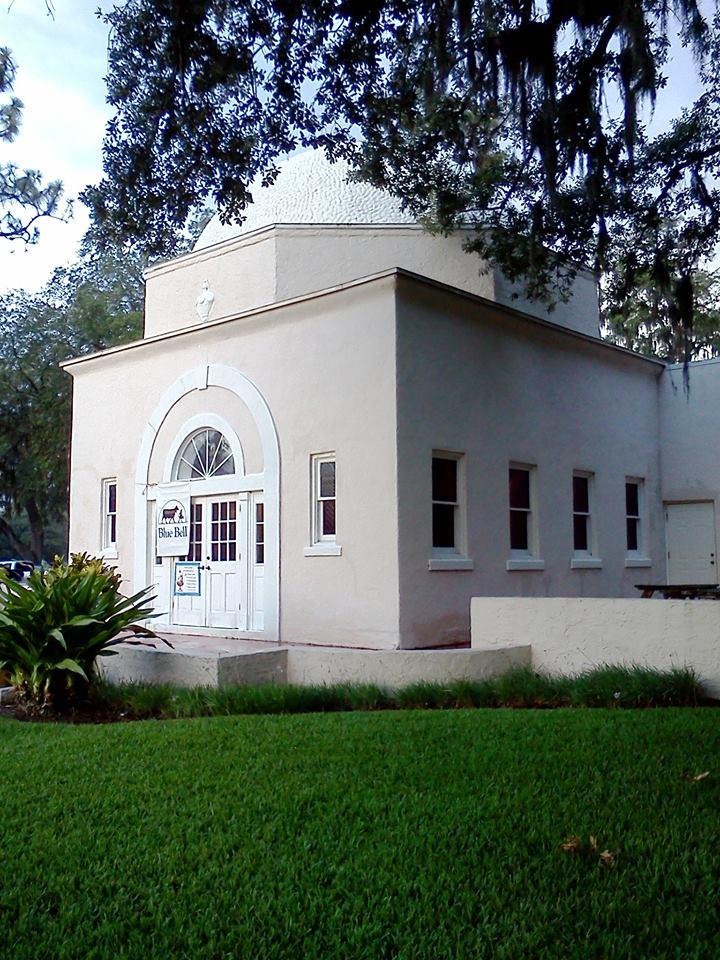
Temple Terrace Community Church

=== Spanish exploration ===
Spanish exploration of the Temple Terrace area dates back to 1757 when explorer Don Francisco Maria Celi of the Spanish Royal Fleet made his way up the Hillsborough River (naming it "El Rio de San Julian y Arriaga") to what is now Riverhills Park in search of pine trees to use as masts for his ships. Here, in the extensive longleaf pine forest, he erected a cross in what he named "El Pinal de la Cruz de Santa Teresa" (the Pine Forest of the Cross of Saint Theresa). Confirmation of the fleet's travels is found in its map and logbook. A historic marker and a replica of the cross erected to honor St. Theresa are found in Riverhills Park today. Up to 1913, the longleaf pine, sand live oak, and cypress trees made the area suitable for turpentine manufacturing and logging.

=== Potter Palmer years ===
The area now known as Temple Terrace was originally part of an exclusive 19,000-acre (77 km^{2}) game preserve called "Riverhills" belonging to Chicago socialite Bertha Palmer, wife of businessman Potter Palmer. She played an extensive role in making Sarasota the "City of the Arts" that it is today. She was one of the largest landholders, ranchers, farmers, and developers in Florida at the turn of the twentieth century. The Evening Independent newspaper in 1918 described the preserve as "a well-stocked hunting preserve north of Tampa being one of the most attractive hunting grounds in the state." Property acquisition by the Palmers and the Honorés began in 1910; only one of the original buildings from the preserve, now known as the Woodmont Clubhouse, remains. Because it escaped logging, the grounds of the clubhouse harbor some of the largest specimens of live oak and longleaf pine in the city.

Mrs. Potter-Palmer's vision for her property was that it be developed into a golf course community surrounded by extensive citrus groves, but her death in 1918 prevented her from fully realizing that vision. At her death, the trustee of her estate and brother, Adrian Honoré, sold her local land holdings to Burks Hamner, Vance Helm, Maud Fowler, Cody Fowler, and D. Collins Gillett, who formed two development corporations: Temple Terrace Estates, Inc., which developed the golf course and residential areas; and Temple Terraces, Inc., which developed 5,000 acres (20 km^{2}) of orange groves that originally surrounded the city to the west and north, the largest orange grove in the world in the 1920s. (Adrian Honoré retained a seat on the board.) D. Collins Gillett oversaw Temple Terraces, Inc. and owned the first and largest citrus nursery in Florida, Buckeye Nurseries of Tampa. His father, Myron E. Gillett, thirty-first mayor of Tampa, was instrumental in popularizing the exotic hybrid Temple orange in the United States.

The 1920 vision for the community was that wealthy retired Northerners would purchase one of the lots in Temple Terrace, build a Mediterranean Revival villa on the lot and also purchase a parcel in the extensive adjoining citrus grove to either manage as a hobby or provide extra income. Temple Terrace was originally only occupied during "The Season" (which lasted roughly from December to the annual Washington Ball held at the clubhouse on February 22). For the rest of the year, the houses were cared for by caretakers until The Season came again and the homeowners returned.

In 1924, part of the 5,000-acre (20 km^{2}) area platted as the Temple Orange grove and called Temple Terraces, Inc. was developed into the present-day neighborhood of Temple Crest, immediately adjacent to Temple Terrace and its west, hugging the Hillsborough River. The land occupied by nearby Busch Gardens was also part of Mrs. Palmer's original 19,000-acre (77 km^{2}) ranch.

In 1925 and 1926, the Temple Terrace Golf and Country Club (which is still in existence) hosted the Florida Open (in 1925 billed as the "Greatest Field of Golfers ever to Play in Florida"). "Long" Jim Barnes was the resident professional of the course at the time (James Kelly Thomson was the course's first pro), and every major golfer of the day competed in the event except for Bobby Jones. Leo Diegel won the tournament. Jim Barnes' friend Fred McLeod is also associated with the early days of the course. The golf-course architect was Tom Bendelow, who also designed Medinah Country Club's Course #3 in Chicago, a 7,508-yard (6,865 m) golf course that has hosted three U.S. Opens (1949, 1975, 1990) and two PGA Championships (1999, 2006). The golf course of the Temple Terrace Golf and Country Club is virtually unchanged since its design by Bendelow and is eligible for the National Register of Historic Places. It measures 6,414 yards with a par of 72.

Temple Terrace is one of the first planned golf-course communities in the United States (1920). The town plan was created by town planner and landscape architect George F. Young, who also created the plan for nearby Davis Islands (Tampa) and McClelland Park (Sarasota), among others. The architecture was designed in the Mediterranean-Revival style by two different architects in two different periods. The first phase was in 1921 by noted Tampa architect M. Leo Elliott (Centro Asturiano de Tampa and Old Tampa City Hall) designed the initial houses and the public buildings. In 1926 renowned New York architect Dwight James Baum (architect of John Ringling's Cà d'Zan, the Hotel El Verona in Sarasota, and the West Side YMCA in New York City) also designed residences in Temple Terrace.

There are fifteen houses and buildings designed by Elliott remaining in the city, the largest collection of his work anywhere. In addition, there are over 35 houses in the city designed by architect Dwight James Baum, which is thought to be the largest collection of his work in the Southeast.

Temple Terrace struggled through the 1930s like the rest of Florida. Building activity began to pick up again after World War II. There is now a fine collection of mid-century modern homes and buildings, at least two of which were designed by well-known architect Frank Albert DePasquale.

=== Florida College ===
Florida Bible Institute bought the old Country Club Clubhouse in the late 1930s from the city for back taxes; it remains a cherished part of Florida College. Florida College is now a private liberal arts college (founded in 1946) and occupies some of the community's oldest buildings, including the Temple Terrace Country Club, which is now Sutton Hall. Billy Graham attended Florida Bible Institute, which owned the property now occupied by Florida College, in the late 1930s. In his autobiography, he writes that he received his calling "on the 18th green of the Temple Terrace Golf and Country Club". A Billy Graham Memorial Park is on the east side of the 18th green on the river.

=== Rejuvenation and redevelopment ===
Temple Terrace's renewal took place between 1984 and 1987. Telecom Park and numerous areas adjacent to the city were annexed, thereby tripling the tax base and doubling the size of the city. Efforts were made to attract new businesses, and new subdivisions were created giving the city a firm tax base.

== Geography ==
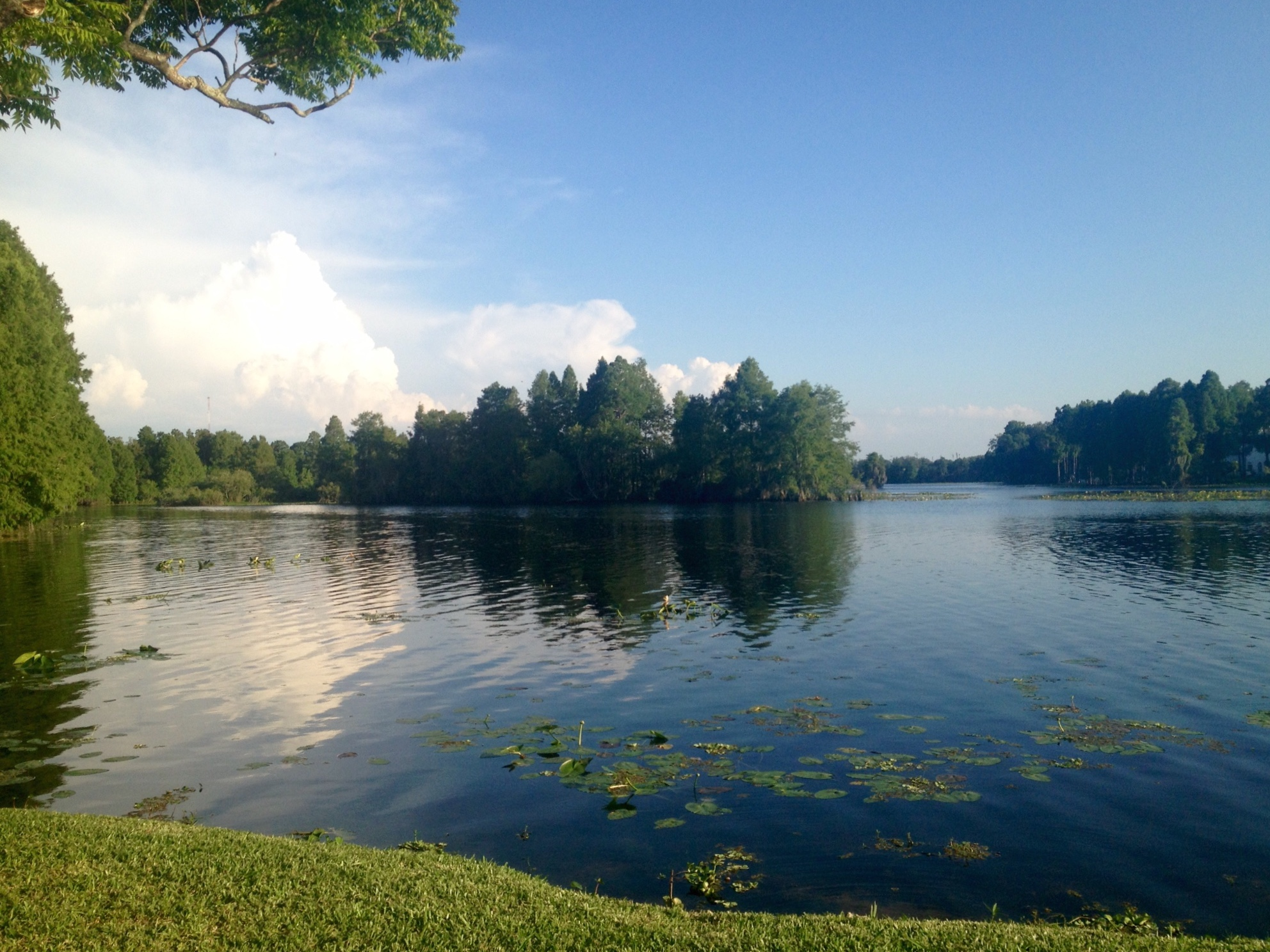
Hillsborough River at Riverhills Park

The city is bounded by Tampa to the west and north, Del Rio to the south, and rural Hillsborough County, near Interstate 75, to the east.

According to the United States Census Bureau, the city has a total area of 7.1 square miles (18.4 km^{2}), of which 6.8 square miles (17.7 km^{2}) are land and 0.3 square miles (0.7 km^{2}), or 3.70%, are water. The Hillsborough River flows through the eastern and southern parts of the city and forms some of its southern boundary.

=== Climate ===
The climate in this area is characterized by hot, humid summers and mild winters. According to the Köppen climate classification, the City of Temple Terrace has a humid subtropical climate zone (Cfa).

== Demographics ==
Historical population
Census	Pop.	Note	%±
1940	215		—
1950	433		101.4%
1960	3,812		780.4%
1970	7,347		92.7%
1980	11,097		51.0%
1990	16,444		48.2%
2000	20,918		27.2%
2010	24,541		17.3%
2020	26,690		8.8%
U.S. Decennial Census

=== Racial and ethnic composition ===
Temple Terrace city, Florida – Racial and ethnic composition Note: the US Census treats Hispanic/Latino as an ethnic category. This table excludes Latinos from the racial categories and assigns them to a separate category. Hispanics/Latinos may be of any race.
Race / Ethnicity (NH = Non-Hispanic)	Pop 2000	Pop 2010	Pop 2020	% 2000	% 2010	% 2020
White alone (NH)	15,163	14,299	12,968	72.49%	58.27%	48.59%
Black or African American alone (NH)	2,267	4,581	5,986	10.84%	18.67%	22.43%
Native American or Alaska Native alone (NH)	68	84	49	0.33%	0.34%	0.18%
Asian alone (NH)	537	1,328	1,531	2.57%	5.41%	5.74%
Native Hawaiian or Pacific Islander alone (NH)	27	17	25	0.13%	0.07%	0.09%
Other race alone (NH)	60	79	184	0.29%	0.32%	0.69%
Mixed race or Multiracial (NH)	423	556	1,199	2.02%	2.27%	4.49%
Hispanic or Latino (any race)	2,373	3,597	4,748	11.34%	14.66%	17.79%
Total	20,918	24,541	26,690	100.00%	100.00%	100.00%

=== 2020 census ===
As of the 2020 census, Temple Terrace had a population of 26,690. The median age was 35.5 years. 19.7% of residents were under the age of 18 and 15.7% of residents were 65 years of age or older. For every 100 females there were 93.1 males, and for every 100 females age 18 and over there were 90.6 males age 18 and over.

100.0% of residents lived in urban areas, while 0.0% lived in rural areas.

There were 10,873 households in Temple Terrace, of which 28.4% had children under the age of 18 living in them. Of all households, 38.0% were married-couple households, 21.5% were households with a male householder and no spouse or partner present, and 33.0% were households with a female householder and no spouse or partner present. About 28.6% of all households were made up of individuals and 9.6% had someone living alone who was 65 years of age or older. There were 5,652 families residing in the city.

There were 11,541 housing units, of which 5.8% were vacant. The homeowner vacancy rate was 1.3% and the rental vacancy rate was 6.9%.

Racial composition as of the 2020 census
Race	Number	Percent
White	14,176	53.1%
Black or African American	6,198	23.2%
American Indian and Alaska Native	93	0.3%
Asian	1,548	5.8%
Native Hawaiian and Other Pacific Islander	34	0.1%
Some other race	1,335	5.0%
Two or more races	3,306	12.4%

=== 2010 census ===
As of the 2010 United States census, there were 24,541 people, 9,888 households, and 5,303 families residing in the city.

=== 2000 census ===
As of the census of 2000, there were 20,918 people, 8,671 households, and 5,350 families residing in the city. The population density was 1,177.3 people/km^{2} (3,049 people/mi^{2}). There were 9,359 housing units at an average density of 526.8 units/km^{2} (1,364 units/mi^{2}). The racial makeup of the city was 80.46% White, 11.16% African American, 0.37% Native American, 2.59% Asian, 0.13% Pacific Islander, 2.39% from other races, and 2.90% from two or more races. Hispanic or Latino of any race were 11.34% of the population.

In 2000, there were 8,671 households, out of which 27.9% had children under the age of 18 living with them, 46.9% were married couples living together, 11.4% had a female householder with no husband present, and 38.3% were non-families. 28.9% of all households were made up of individuals, and 8.3% had someone living alone who was 65 years of age or older. The average household size was 2.36 and the average family size was 2.95.

In 2000, in the city, the population was spread out, with 22.2% under the age of 18, 12.4% from 18 to 24, 29.9% from 25 to 44, 23.5% from 45 to 64, and 11.9% who were 65 years of age or older. The median age was 35 years. For every 100 females, there were 91.4 males. For every 100 females age 18 and over, there were 87.2 males.

In 2000, the median income for a household in the city was $44,508, and the median income for a family was $56,809. Males had a median income of $38,384 versus $32,107 for females. The per capita income for the city was $26,515. About 5.4% of families and 7.2% of the population were below the poverty line, including 5.8% of those under age 18 and 8.9% of those age 65 or over.

== Arts and culture ==
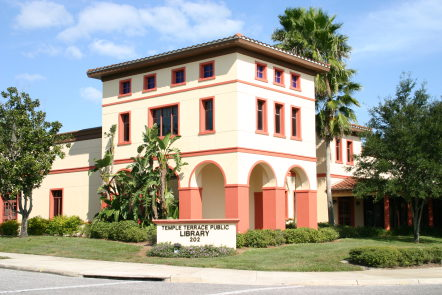
Temple Terrace Public Library

The Temple Terrace Public Library was established in 1959. Services include a standard book, eBook, CD, and DVD checkout.

== Education ==
Temple Terrace is served by Hillsborough County Schools.

=== Elementary schools ===
- Temple Terrace Elementary School
- Riverhills Elementary School
- Lewis Elementary School

=== Middle schools ===
- Terrace Community Middle School
- Angelo L. Greco Middle School

=== High schools ===
- C. Leon King High School
- Dr. Kiran C. Patel High School

=== Private schools ===
- Temple Terrace Presbyterian Weekday School
- Florida College Academy (private school)
- Corpus Christi Catholic School
- American Youth Academy

=== College ===
- Florida College

== Notable people ==
- Joe Bondi, academic and former mayor (1974–1978)
- Pam Bondi, 87th United States Attorney General (2025−2026) and 37th Florida Attorney General (2011−2019)
- Sammy Ellis, professional MLB baseball pitcher
- Cody Fowler, prominent Florida attorney and former President of the American Bar Association
- Napoleon Hill, motivational author and speaker
- Peter Palmer, actor
- Colonel Tom Parker, Elvis Presley's manager
- Robin Roberts, professional MLB Hall of Fame baseball pitcher
- Owen Teague, actor

== Sister cities ==
- (United Kingdom) Eastleigh, England, since 1989.
