= Gloria Jahoda =

American author

- Born: October 6, 1926; Chicago, Illinois
- Died: January 13, 1980 (aged 53)
- Education: Northwestern University
- Occupation: Author
- Employer: Florida State University

Gloria Jahoda (October 6, 1926 – January 13, 1980) was an American author of fiction and non-fiction, including literature for young readers. She is best known for her book about the Hillsborough River, River of the Golden Ibis and her collection of essays The Other Florida about parts of north-central Florida that had largely been neglected up until the 1960s, or at least not written about by historians.

Her essays include a description of Dr. John Gorrie's quest to make ice in the Florida Panhandle, the story of Natural Bridge where the Confederate Army had their final victory, the inspiration composer Frederick Delius received from Black native music in Florida as well as various local fishermen, turpentine tappers, preachers, and other characters who lived in the rural area. Jahoda also included hundreds of descriptions of flora and fauna.

Jahoda is also the author of Annie, Delilah's Mountain (novels) Trail of Tears and The Road to Samarkand: Frederick Delius and His Music. Her River of the Golden Ibis, part of the Rivers of America Series, was voted "Best History Book" in 1973 by the Society of Midland Authors.

== Biography ==
Jahoda was born in Chicago and graduated from Northwestern University with a BA in English and an MS in anthropology.

She came to Florida in 1963 when her husband, Gerald Jahoda, was appointed professor of Library Science at the Florida State University. In 1973, Jahoda was honored by the Florida Senate and was also awarded an honorary doctorate by the University of West Florida for her services to Floridian culture and the history of Florida as a writer and advocate.

== Works ==
=== Fiction ===
- Annie - Houghton Mifflin; Boston; 1960
- Delilah's Mountain - Houghton Mifflin, Boston, 1963

' The Loving Maid' ...Chatto and Windus (London) 1962. Set in Norfolk, England, UK.

=== Non-fiction ===
- The Road to Samarkand: Frederick Delius and His Music - Charles Scribner's Sons; New York, NY; 1969
- The Other Florida - Charles Scribner's Sons, New York, NY, 1967
- River of the Golden Ibis - Holt, Rinehart & Winston, New York, 1973 (Part of the Rivers of America Series)
- The Trail of Tears The Story of the American Indian Removals 1813-1855' - Holt, Rhinehart & Winston, New York, 1975
- Florida: A Bicentennial History - W. W. Norton & Company; New York; 1976

== Sources ==
- The Other Florida (jacket)
- River of the Golden Ibis (Jacket)
- Search on 24 August 2008 of ABE.com
