= Hillsborough River State Park =

State park in Florida, United States

- IUCN category III (natural monument or feature)
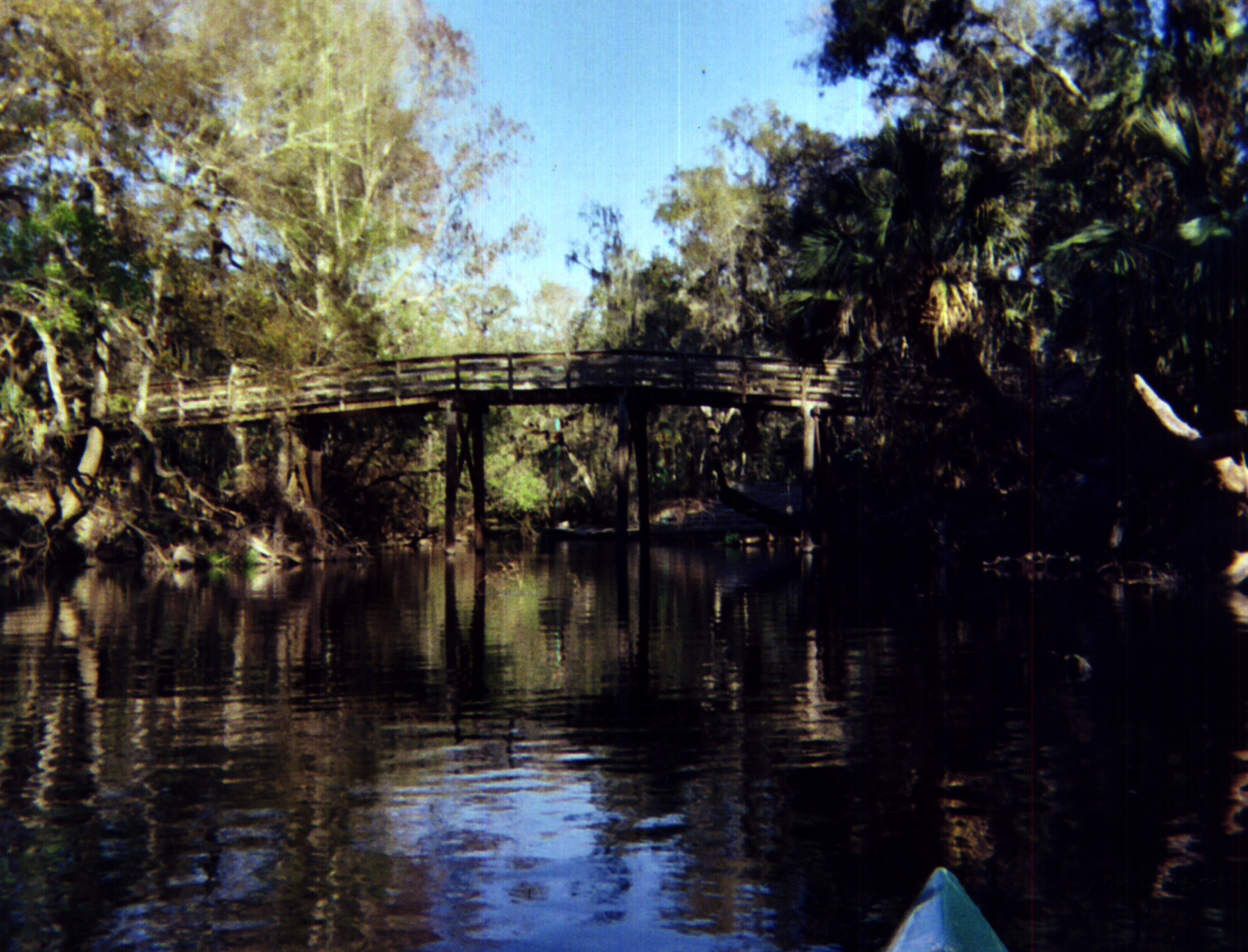
- Hillsborough River

- Location within Florida Location within the United States
- Interactive map of Hillsborough River State Park
- Location: Hillsborough County, Florida
- Nearest city: Tampa and Zephyrhills
- Coordinates: 28°06′14″N 82°16′41″W
- Area: 3,383 acres (13.69 km^{2})
- Established: 1935
- Governing body: Florida Department of Environmental Protection

Hillsborough River State Park is located in the northeast corner of Hillsborough County, Florida near Zephyrhills (which is itself in Pasco County). It is a popular park due to its proximity to the city of Tampa. It closed in October 2024 due to damage from Hurricane Milton, and re-opened on February 24, 2025.

The park consists of over 1,369 hectares or 3,383 acres, and there are more than seven miles of trails that run throughout it. Popular activities include fishing, canoeing, kayaking, picnicking, camping, birding, easy to moderate hiking, trail running, and nature photography. The park has award-winning campgrounds, a restaurant, and gift shop. Canoes and bicycles can be rented at the park.

== Environment ==
Much of the park is a live oak hammock due to its proximity to the river. Certain sections are swampy, but much of the forest surrounding the river is elevated, so floods are not regular. Land near the entrance of the park consists of pine trees and saw palmettos. The park is cleaved into two halves by a swiftly flowing section of the Hillsborough River. This section of the river is noted for having several clusters of small rapids, including Class II rapids. It is considered a blackwater river, and is one of the few rivers in Florida to have a system of rapids.

== History ==
=== Park creation ===
Hillsborough River State Park is one of the eight original Florida State Parks created in 1938. The park was originally built by the Civilian Conservation Corps (CCC), and some of the original structures remain, including the buildings that now house the administrative offices and Interpretive Center, the suspension bridge, and a section of fence. These demonstrate the rustic architecture style that was popular with the CCC.

=== The Second Seminole War ===
Also located on park land is a replica of Fort Foster, which was originally built in 1836 during the Second Seminole War. Tours of the fort are given on weekends, which is the only way to view the fort. On special occasions, reenactments happen at the fort, where visitors can interact with "soldiers" in replica uniforms to learn about their duties at the fort. The Interpretive Center, which is located near the original entrance to the park, showcases many artifacts from the war. Both sides of the conflict are represented in the center, with a collection of more than 100 objects on display.

== Gallery ==
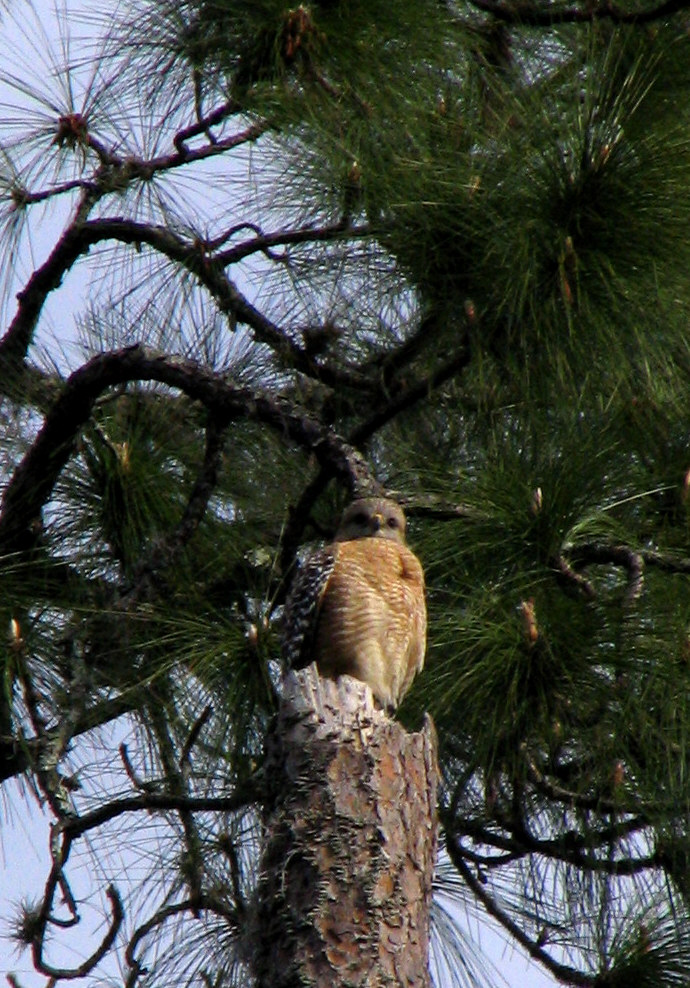
Red-shouldered hawk

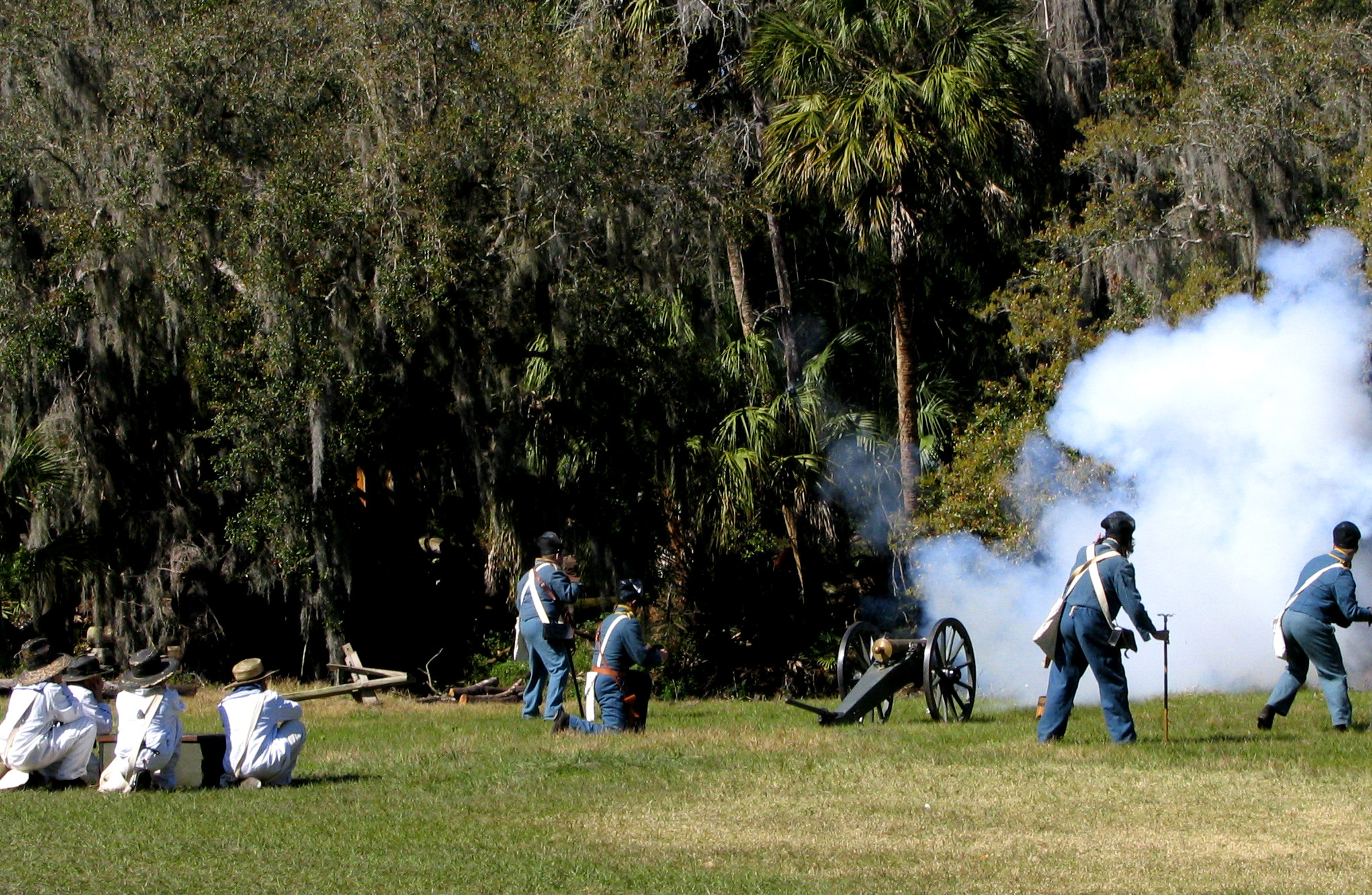
Seminole War reenactors

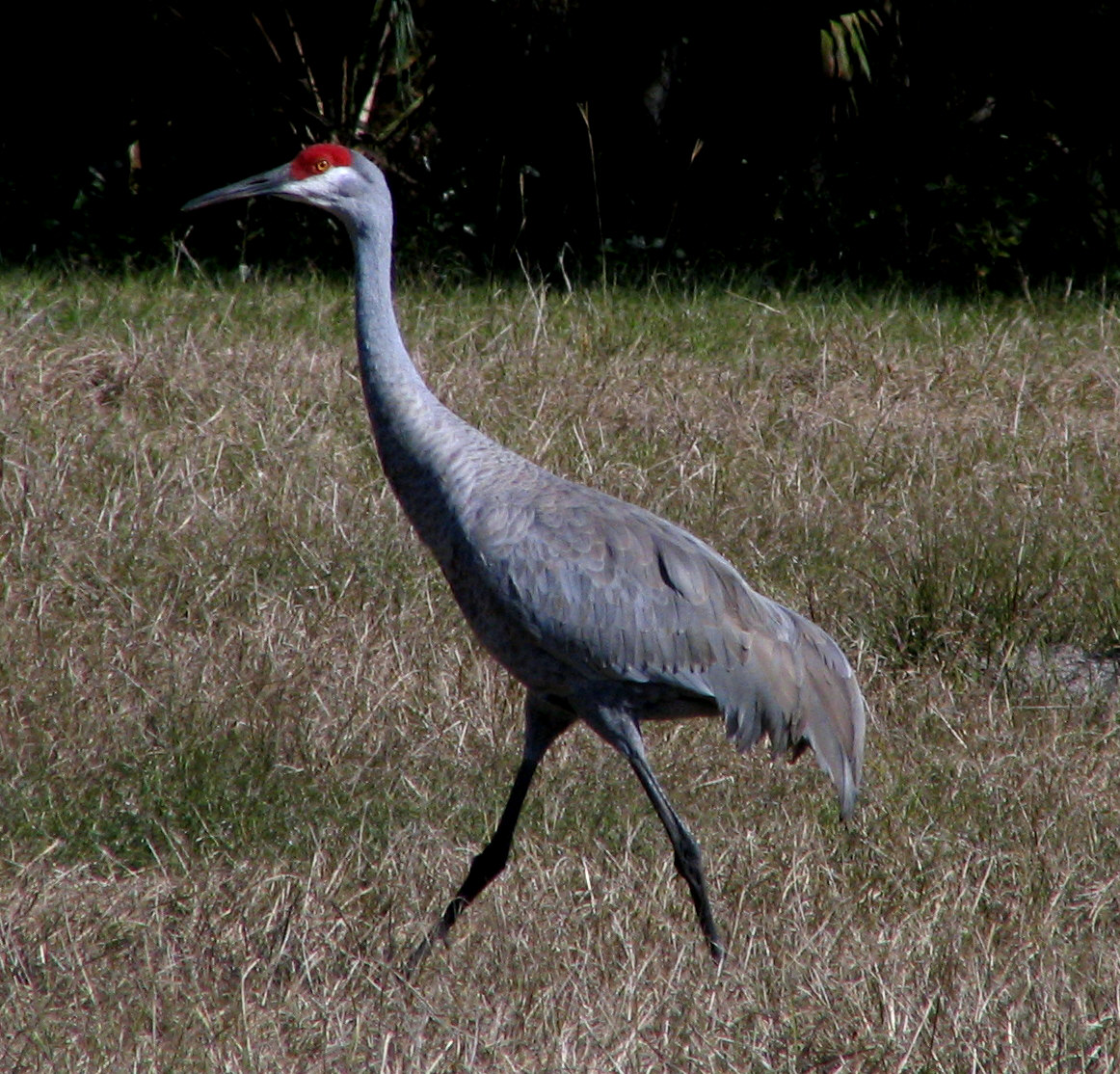
Sandhill crane

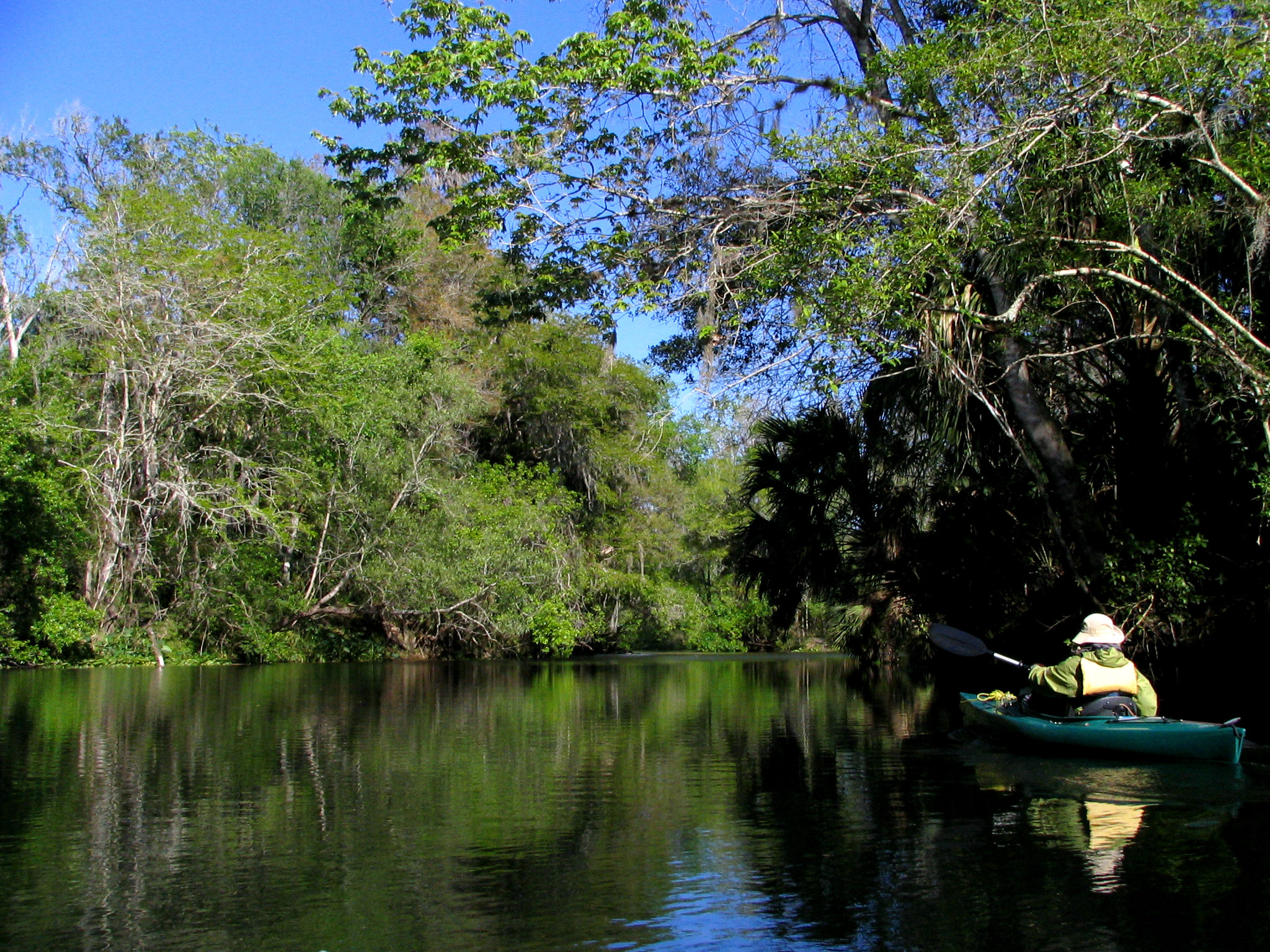
Paddling on the Hillsborough River

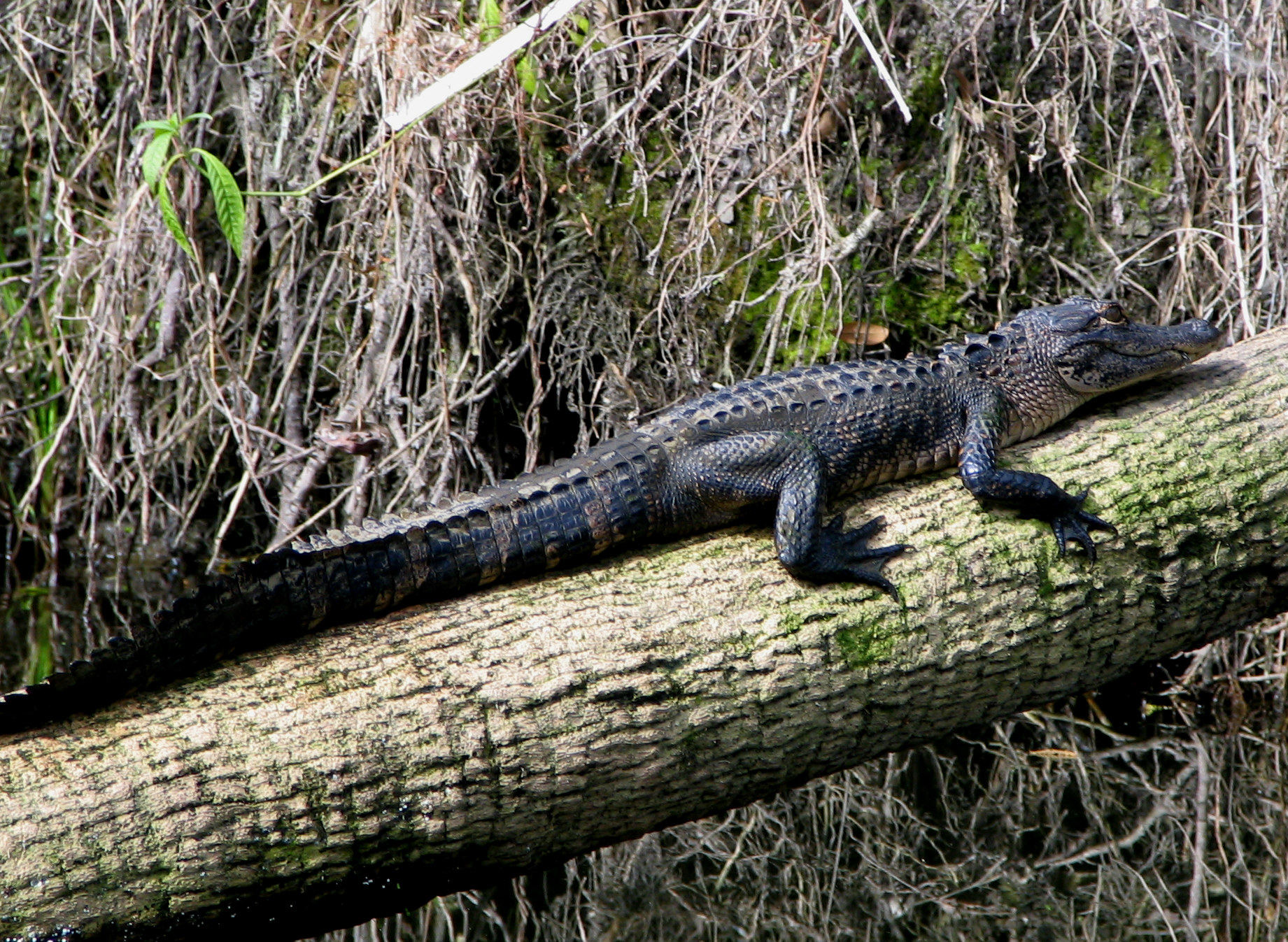
Alligator on the river

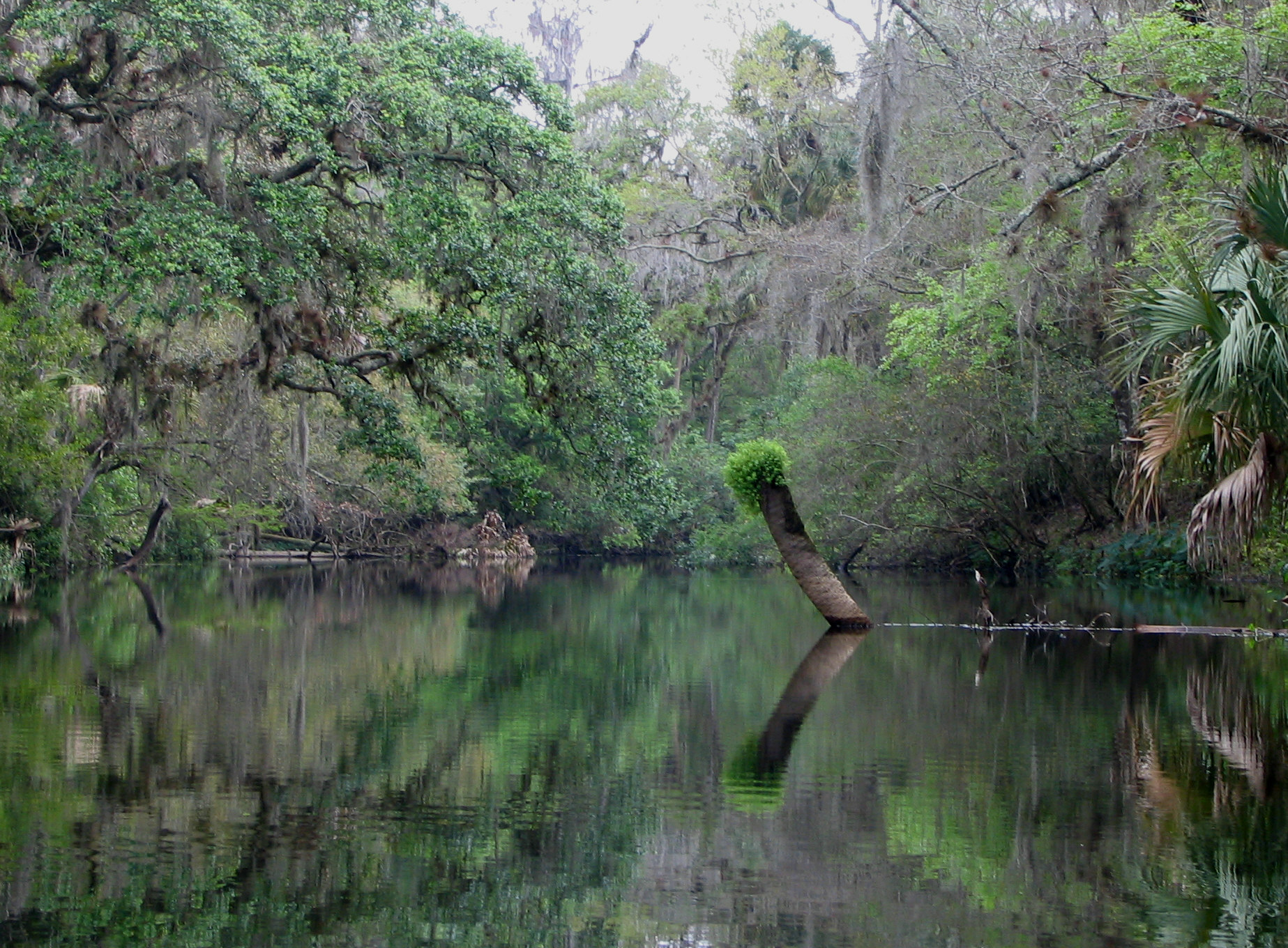
On the Hillsborough River

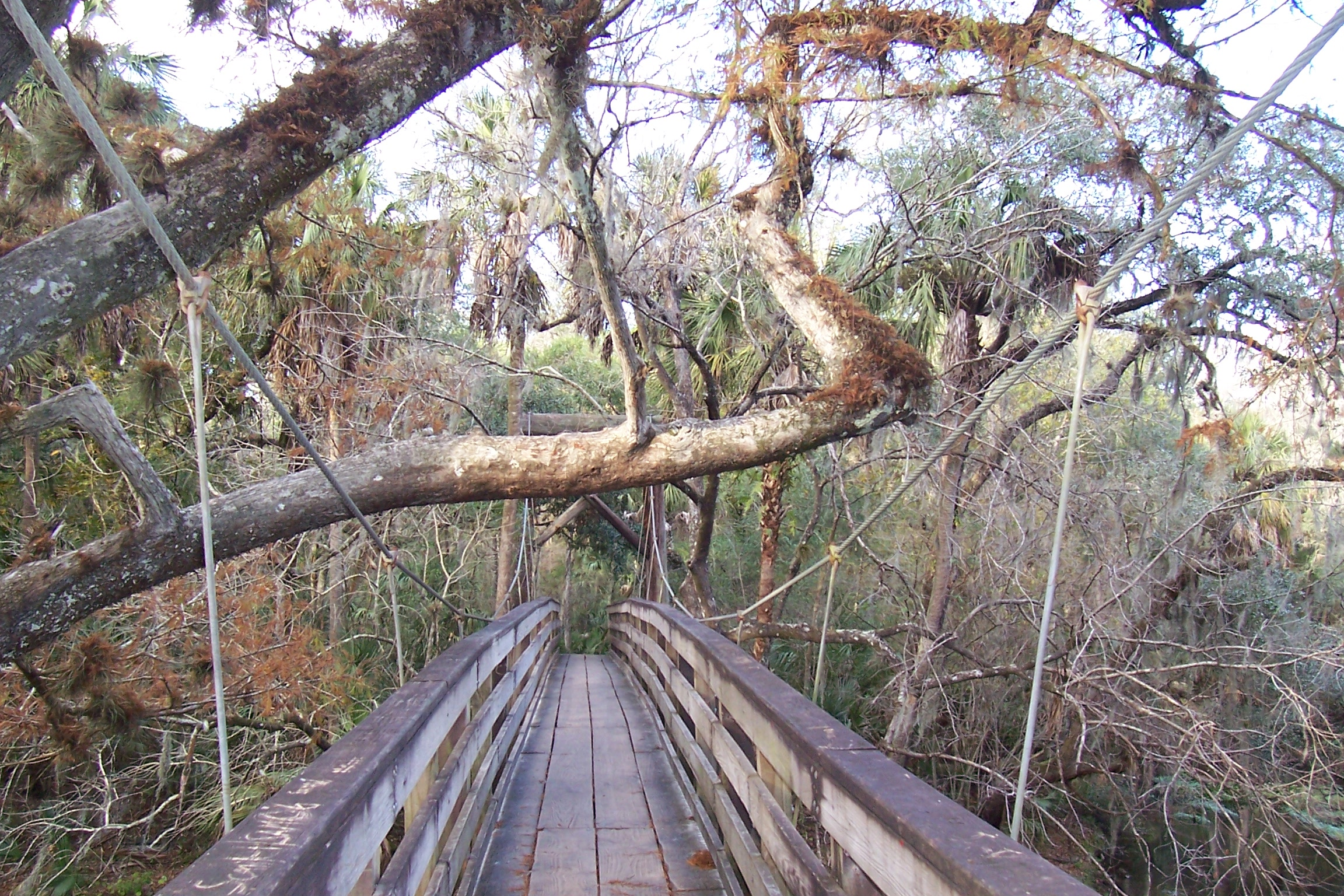
Suspension bridge

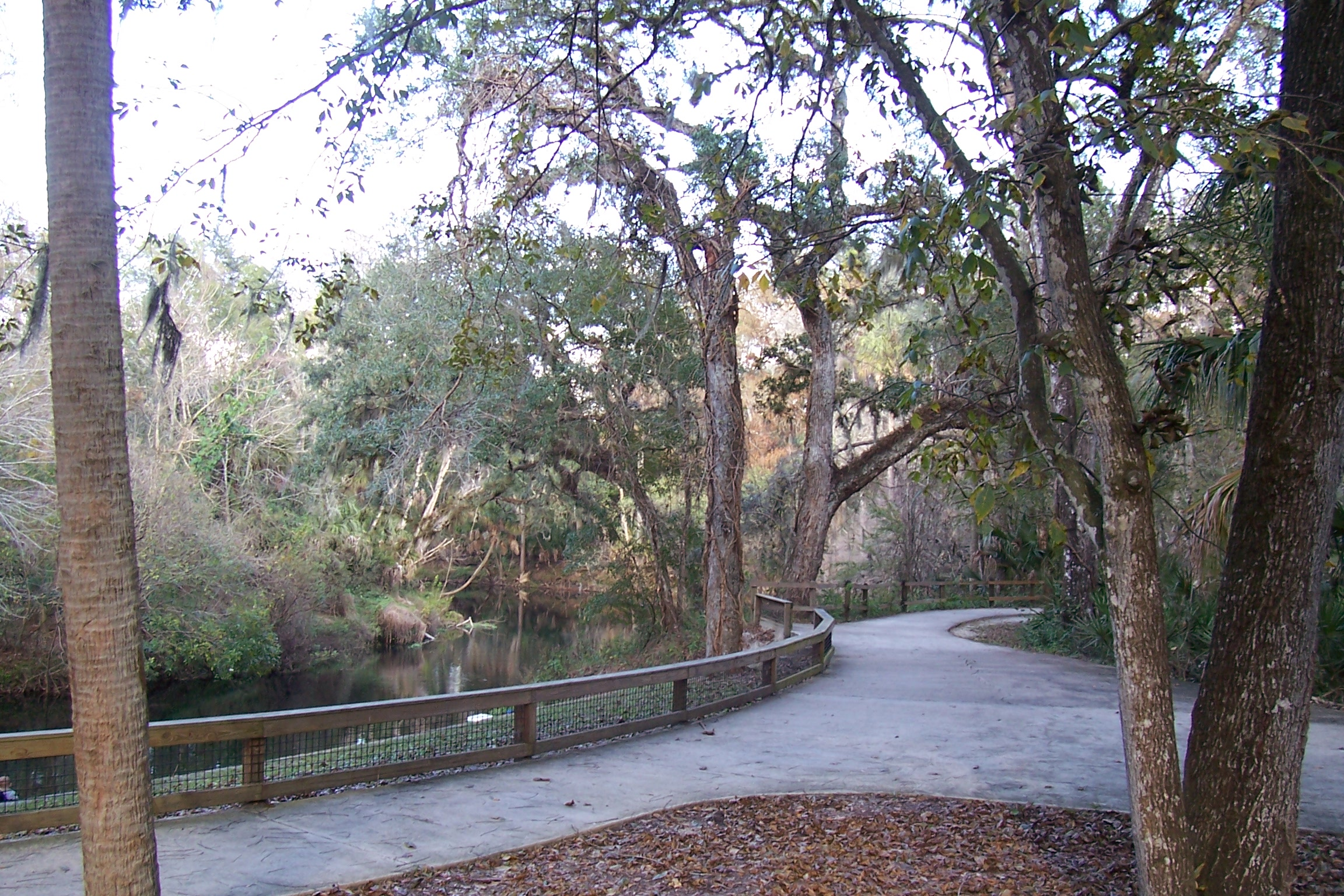
Walkway by the Hillsborough River

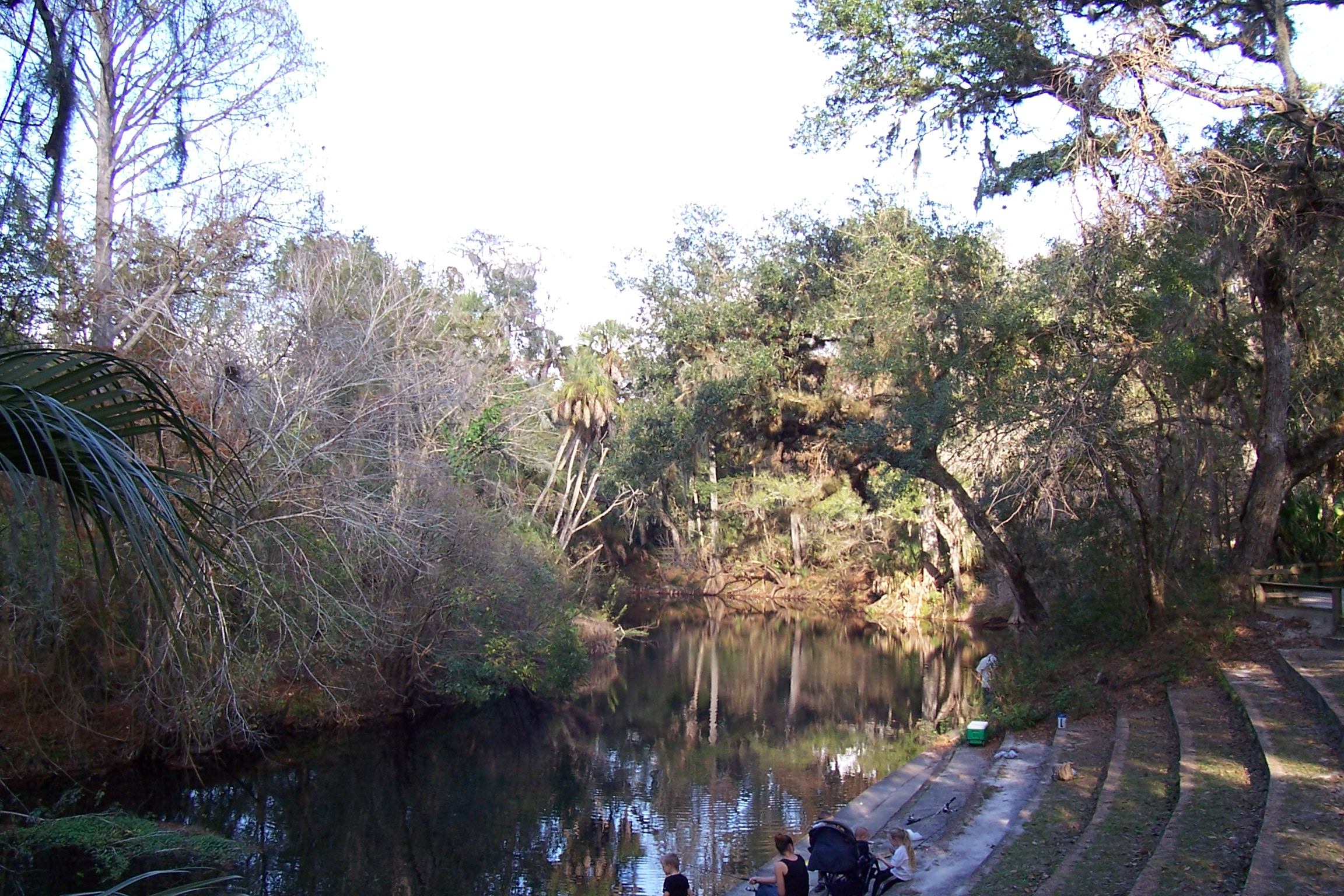
Amphitheater

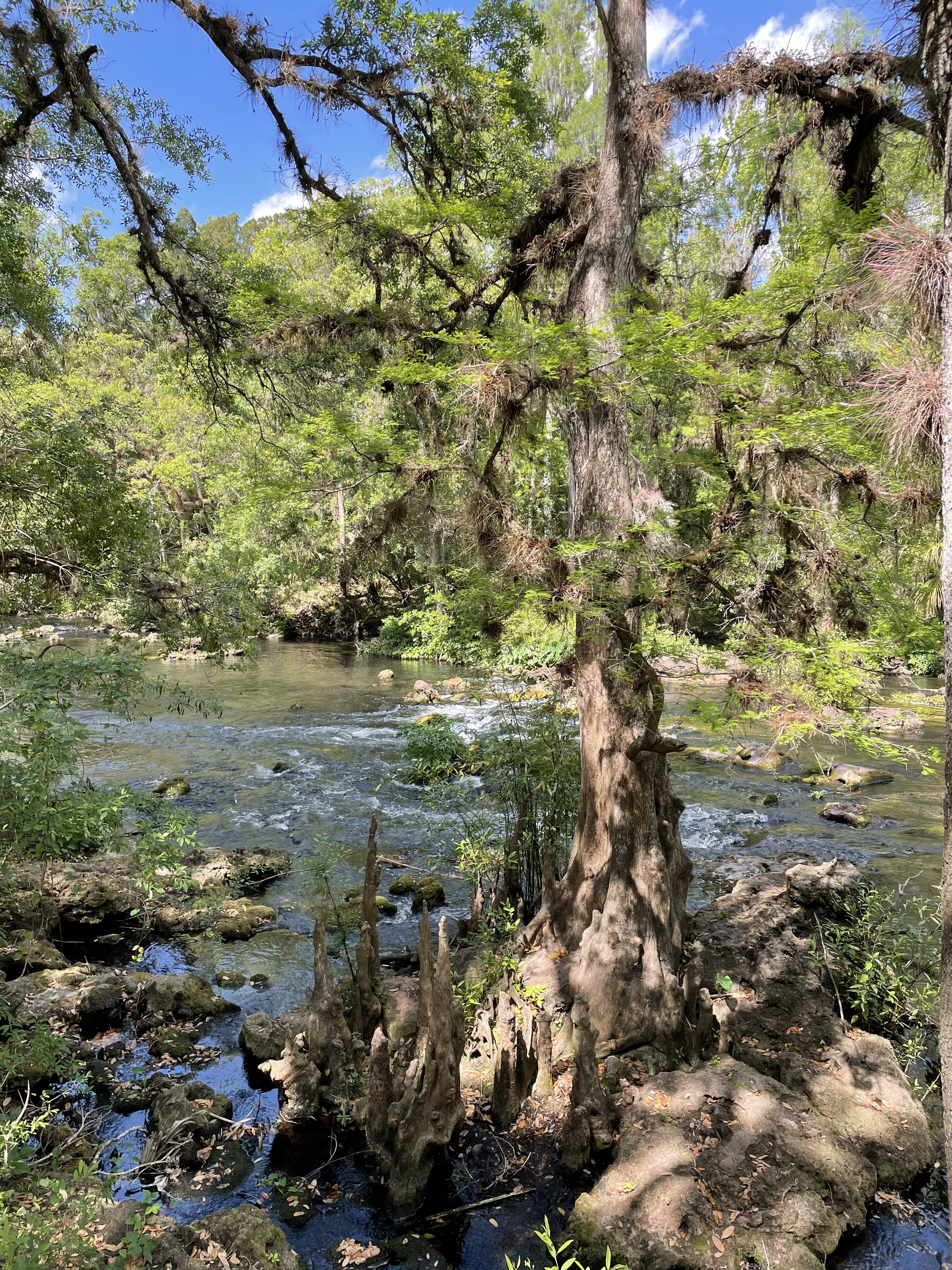
Rapids at Hillsborough State Park

== Climate ==
Climate data for Hillsborough River State Park
Month	Jan	Feb	Mar	Apr	May	Jun	Jul	Aug	Sep	Oct	Nov	Dec	Year
Record high °F (°C)	88 (31)	91 (33)	94 (34)	99 (37)	101 (38)	102 (39)	102 (39)	99 (37)	98 (37)	95 (35)	92 (33)	89 (32)	102 (39)
Mean daily maximum °F (°C)	72 (22)	75 (24)	78 (26)	83 (28)	88 (31)	90 (32)	91 (33)	91 (33)	89 (32)	85 (29)	79 (26)	74 (23)	83 (28)
Mean daily minimum °F (°C)	49 (9)	52 (11)	55 (13)	59 (15)	65 (18)	71 (22)	73 (23)	73 (23)	71 (22)	65 (18)	58 (14)	52 (11)	62 (17)
Record low °F (°C)	17 (−8)	22 (−6)	24 (−4)	32 (0)	43 (6)	49 (9)	59 (15)	61 (16)	52 (11)	38 (3)	21 (−6)	18 (−8)	17 (−8)
Average precipitation inches (mm)	2.72 (69)	2.82 (72)	3.57 (91)	2.69 (68)	3.38 (86)	8.62 (219)	7.60 (193)	8.32 (211)	7.08 (180)	2.36 (60)	1.83 (46)	2.66 (68)	53.65 (1,363)
Source: http://wwworigin.weather.com/weather/wxclimatology/monthly/FLSPHR:13
