= Gimmick (professional wrestling) =

Professional wrestling in-ring persona

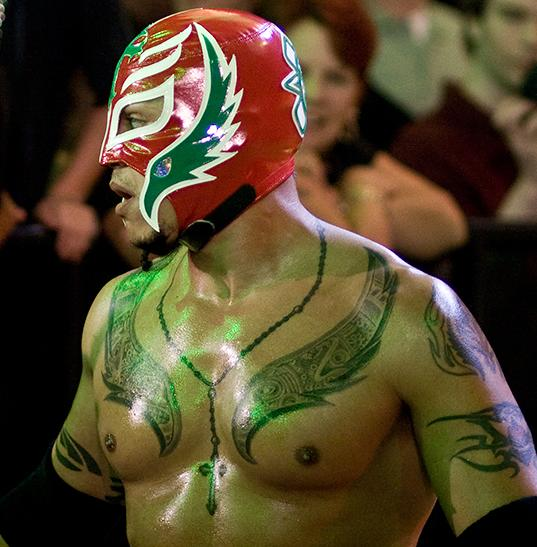
WWE wrestler Rey Mysterio uses a masked character gimmick.

In professional wrestling, a gimmick broadly refers to a wrestler's in-ring persona, character, behaviour, attire, or other distinguishing traits while performing, which are typically designed to draw fan interest. Gimmicks often involve costumes, makeup, and catchphrases that the wrestler shouts at opponents or fans. Gimmicks are developed for good guys/heroes (babyfaces) or bad guys/villains (heel) depending on whether the wrestler is intended to be popular or hated by the audience. A tweener gimmick falls between the two extremes when a wrestler manifests both heel and face traits, such as Randy Orton's viper gimmick. A wrestler may use more than one gimmick over their career depending on the angle or the wrestling promotion they are working for.

Promotions may transfer a gimmick from one wrestler to another, occasionally taking advantage of a masked character, which allows the identity of the performer to be concealed. Razor Ramon was portrayed by both Scott Hall and Rick Bognar and Diesel was portrayed by Kevin Nash and then Glen Jacobs. Occasionally, a wrestler uses a gimmick as a tribute to another worker, such as Ric Flair's Nature Boy persona, which he took on as an homage to the original Nature Boy, Buddy Rogers . When a wrestler acts outside their gimmick, this is known as "breaking kayfabe", a term showing pro wrestling's linkages to theatre, where the terms "breaking the fourth wall" or "breaking character" are used; however, as wrestlers typically interact with a live audience under the pretense of engaging in a real combat sport, the concept of a fourth wall (a clear metaphorical boundary between reality and the fictional performance) is maintained to a lesser degree than in most forms of theatre.

Gimmicks are annually rated for the Wrestling Observer Newsletter awards by the publication's owner, professional wrestling journalists, and various industry insiders, such as Dave Meltzer, promoters, agents and performers, other journalists, historians, and fans. The two awards are given to the best and worst gimmick of that year.

== History ==
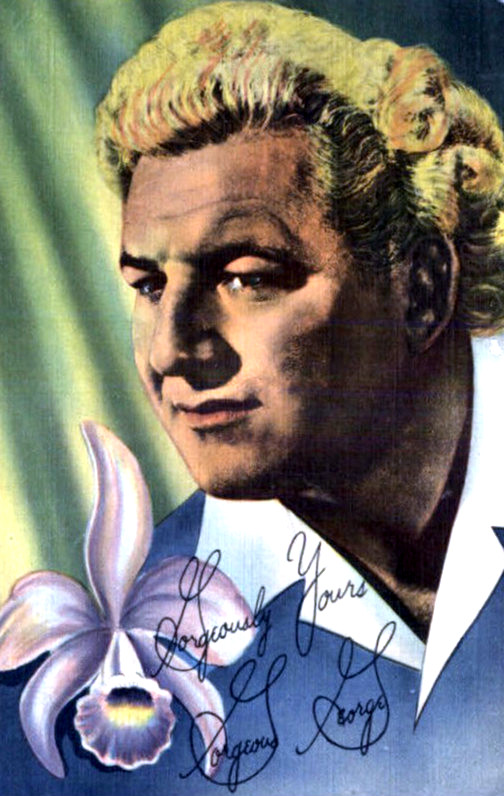
Photo postcard of Gorgeous George, one of pro wrestling's first modern gimmicks

=== Beginnings (1860s to 1940s) ===
Pro wrestling's history has been tied to the use of gimmicks from its infancy. From its circus origins in the 1830s, showmen presented wrestlers under names such as "Edward, the steel eater", "Gustave d’Avignon, the bone wrecker", or "Bonnet, the ox of the low Alps" and challenged the public to knock them down for 500 francs.

During the late 19th century-early 20th century, when wrestler Frank Gotch rose to prominence, the focus became on contests largely legitimate (see catch wrestling), which largely resulted in the abandoning previous character gimmicks.

=== Television era (1950s to 1970s) ===
It was not until the First Golden Age of Professional Wrestling in the United States during the 1940s–1950s, when Gorgeous George created pro wrestling's first major gimmick. His heel character focused on his looks and quickly antagonized the fans with his exaggerated effeminate behavior, drawing jealousy to the fans. Such showmanship was unheard of for the time; and consequently, arena crowds grew in size as fans turned out to ridicule George.

Gorgeous George's impact and legacy on wrestling gimmicks was enormous, demonstrating how fast television changed the product from athletics to performance. Before him, wrestlers' gimmicks imitated "ethnic terrors"—Nazis, Middle Eastern Muslims (Arabs, Turks, Persians, Bengalis, Afghans, etc.), Japanese, Russians, etc.—but his success birthed a more individualistic and narcissist form of character.

He was one of the first pro-wrestlers to use entrance music, "Pomp and Circumstance" which always played as he made his way to the ring.

In Britain, television took British wrestling to the next level when in 1964, it went full-time as part of the World of Sport show.

The style of wrestling at the time was unique with strong emphasis on clean technical wrestling. Heels made up a minority of the roster, with most shows containing an abnormally high proportion of clean sportsmanly matches between two "blue-eyes" (as faces were known backstage in the UK). This would remain the case for several decades to come. Gimmick matches were a rarity, midget wrestling failed to catch on, while women were banned by the Greater London Council until the late 1970s.

=== Explosion (1980–present) ===
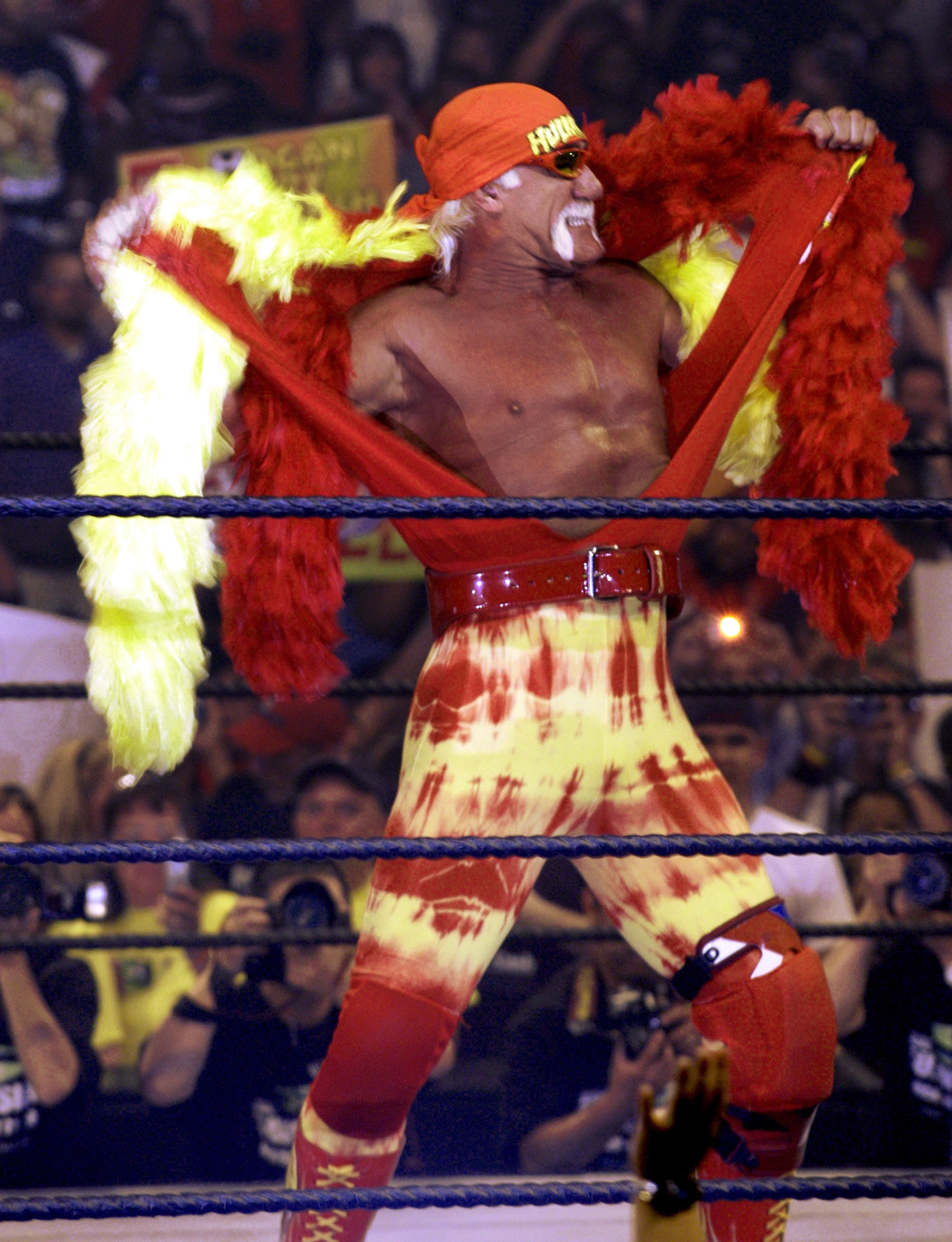
Hogan making his entrance at SummerSlam in 2005

During the Golden Age of pro wrestling in the 1980s–1990s, a rise of cartoonish, outlandish gimmicks became popular with the increase of the World Wrestling Federation's popularity.

The WWF contributed to the explosion of gimmicks by becoming the most colorful and well-known wrestling brand because of its child-oriented characters, soap opera dramatics and cartoon-like personas. Most notable was the muscular Hulk Hogan, who marked the 1980s with his "Real-American" gimmick and made his main events into excellent ratings draws. His dominant role in the industry at that time led to this era to be also known as "Hulkamania". Around this time, wrestling became a form of entertainment rather than an official sport.

Other wrestlers from this era with similarly vivid and outlandish characterization include The Iron Sheik, Ultimate Warrior, Randy Savage, The Undertaker, Sting, Goldust, Roddy Piper, Ric Flair, "The Heartbreak Kid" Shawn Michaels, "Big Daddy Cool" Diesel, Kwang, The Bushwhackers, Big Boss Man, Tatanka, Razor Ramon, Sgt. Slaughter, Irwin R. Schyster, among many others.

Beginning with the Ruthless Aggression era following the Attitude era, the emphasis of gimmicks became more realistic with wrestlers portraying themselves or actual people without wild exaggeration, freakishness or fantastical qualities. It is also more common for the wrestlers to use their actual names. Wrestlers like Randy Orton, Batista, Bobby Lashley, John Cena, and Brock Lesnar are prime examples. All the said wrestlers are depicted as less-exaggerated average people.

Although rare, colorful and cartoon-like characters remain in the WWE, such as Shinsuke Nakamura (a wildly random, erratic mixed martial arts enigma, emotionally charged by the sound of violins) and Matt Riddle (a stereotypical carefree, barefoot surfer Valley boy). Outside WWE, some wrestlers have made names for themselves on the crowded independent circuit by adopting absurdist comedy gimmicks intended to be understood by post-kayfabe fans as purely fictional characters. Two such wrestlers whose independent-scene popularity got them noticed and eventually signed by the internationally televised promotion All Elite Wrestling are Orange Cassidy, an emotionless slacker who puts as little effort as possible into his matches and frequently wrestles with his hands in his pockets; and Danhausen, a demonic but somewhat-bumbling figure in horror face paint who claims to be "very nice, very evil" and attempts to put curses on his opponents.

== Common gimmicks ==
=== Related to origin ===
Exaggerating the characteristics of a wrestler's (on occasion fabricated) origin is one of the most commonly exploited gimmicks, in which overarching characteristics of a character play up to clichés and stereotypes.

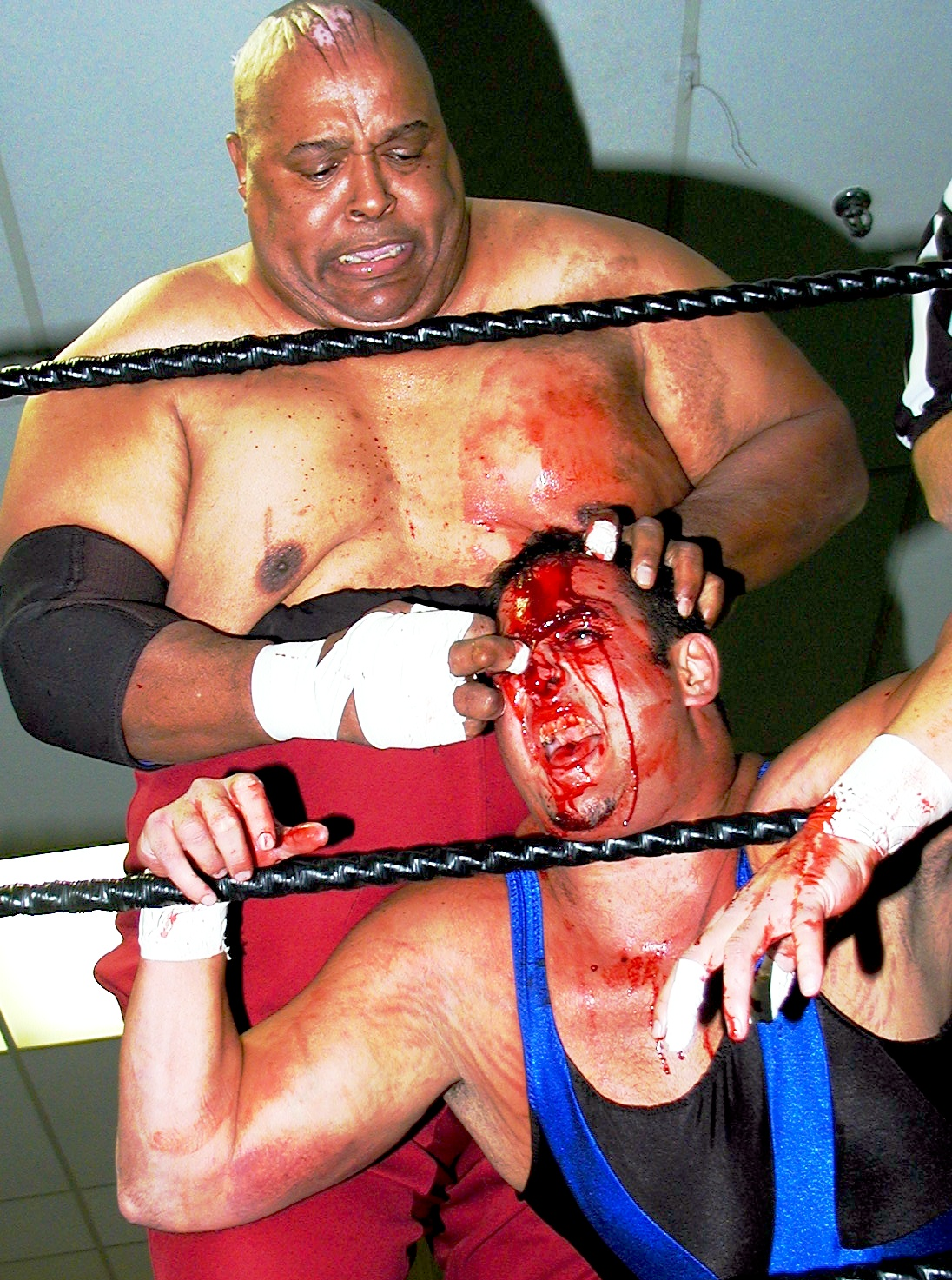
Abdullah the Butcher created his Arabian sadist gimmick, but he was actually born in Canada

A long list of wrestlers in this category includes:

- Arab: The Sheik, The Sultan, Muhammad Hassan
- African: Kamala, Abdullah The Butcher, Akeem
- American: The Patriot, Hulk Hogan, 'Hacksaw' Jim Duggan, Jack Swagger
- Australian: Outback Jack, Nathan Jones
- Austrian: Gunther
- Bulgarian: Rusev
- Canadian: Team Canada (TNA), Team Canada (WCW)
- Chinese: Xia Li, Boa
- Cuban: Razor Ramon
- English: William Regal, Lord Alfred Hayes, Gentleman Jack Gallagher
- French/Québécois: La Résistance
- German: Fritz Von Erich, Baron von Raschke
- Hawaiian: Crush, Leilani Kai
- Indian: The Great Khali, Jinder Mahal
- Iranian: The Iron Sheik, Ariya Daivari
- Irish: Finlay, Sheamus
- Italian: Full Blooded Italians, Santino Marella
- Jamaican: Kofi Kingston
- Japanese: Yokozuna, The Orient Express, Mr. Fuji
- Mexican: The Mexicools
- Native American: Chief Jay Strongbow, Tatanka
- New Zealander: The Sheepherders
- Nigerian: Apollo Crews
- Pacific Islander: Jimmy Snuka, The Wild Samoans, The Headshrinkers
- Puerto Rican: Carlito Colón, Primo and Epico
- Polish: Ivan Putski
- Russian: Ivan Koloff, Nikolai Volkoff, Lana
- Scottish: Drew McIntyre, Roddy Piper
- Swiss: Claudio Castagnoli

=== Masked ===
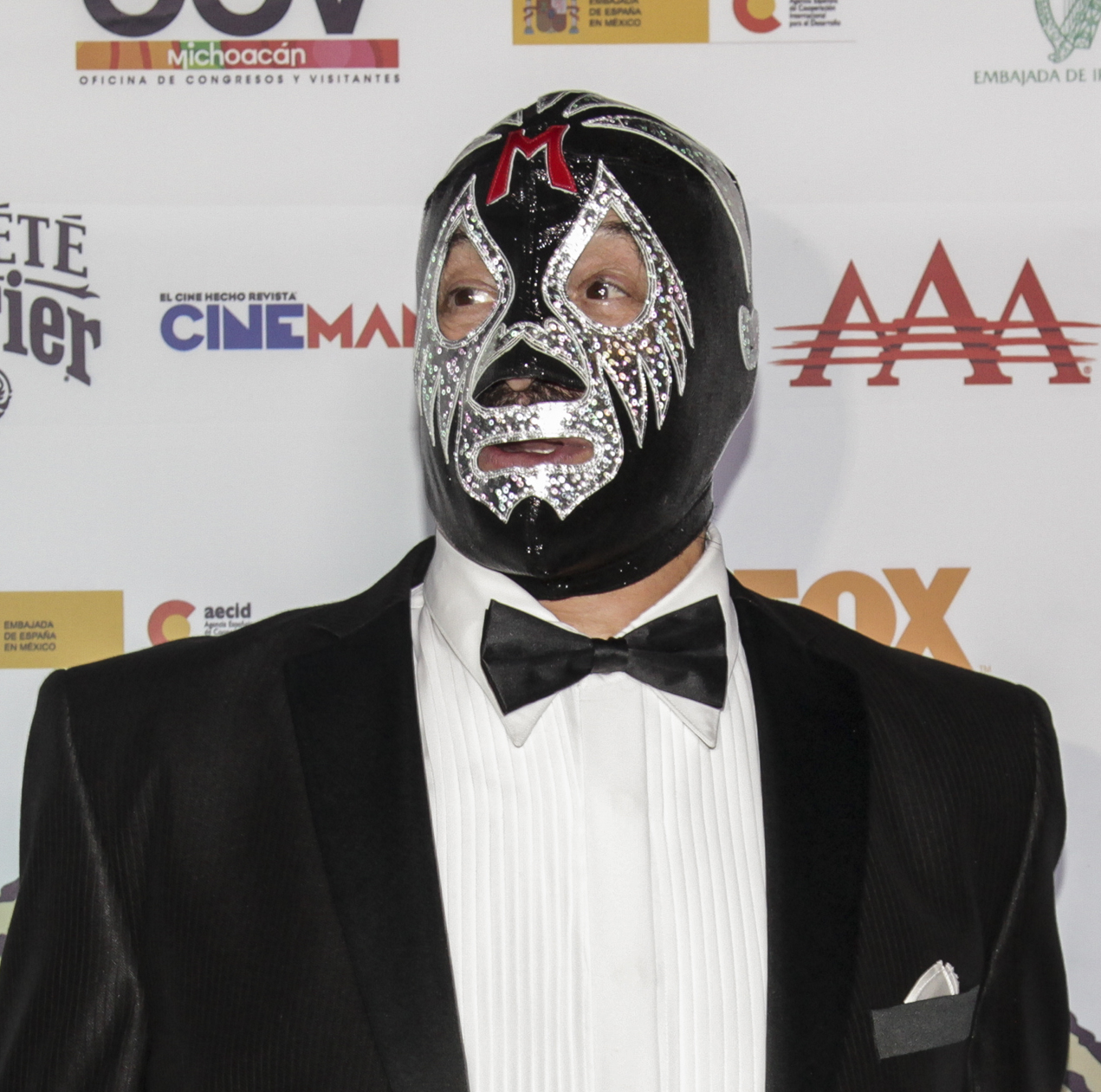
Mil Máscaras was the first masked wrestler to perform at Madison Square Garden

Masked wrestlers made their appearance in Europe (Theobaud Bauer in France, 1865) and the United States (Mort Henderson as "Masked Marvel" in 1915) considerably earlier than in Mexico, but it was the latter that popularised the use of masks. This, in some cases to signify a high-flyer style, influenced by Mexican professional wrestling style know lucha libre.

A specific masked gimmick may be used by more than one wrestler at a wrestling company's request since their identity can be permanently concealed. This is the case of Mexican Sin Cara and Japanese Tiger Mask. Masks also allow a wrestler to perform as more than one character for a variety of wrestling promotions. In Mexico, a masked wrestler's identity is often not even a matter of public record, and being unmasked, usually as a stipulation of losing a match, is considered a great humiliation. It is a major taboo for a Mexican wrestler who has lost his mask to start wearing one again, though this has occasionally been violated, as in the case of Rey Mysterio.

Other wrestlers who have used masks in their performances include: The Masked Superstar, Mexican-American Kalisto, Lince Dorado, Gran Metalik, or Japanese legend Jushin Thunder Liger.

=== Sports ===
A high number of wrestlers who start their careers in another sport incorporate their athletic abilities as part of their act. That is the case for Olympic medallist Kurt Angle, who previously competed in freestyle wrestling and alludes to it in his attire and wrestling style. Brock Lesnar is also an ex-amateur wrestler, NFL player and UFC champion. Welsh wrestler Mason Ryan is also a former Gladiator and football player. English wrestler Wade Barrett was also a former bare-knuckle fighter as well as Elijah Burke who is also a former amateur boxer. Former MMA fighters Ronda Rousey and Shayna Baszler also uses their MMA background as part of their characters as well as former American Ninja Warrior competitor Kacy Catanzaro, former kung-fu fighter Xia Li, and Matt Riddle, who always wrestles barefooted during matches, presuming that he had an MMA background career in the past before debuting in WWE along with Mojo Rawley's "hyperactive" wrestling style due to being a former NFL player before debuting WWE as well as the stable The Four Horsemen.

=== Superheroes, supervillains and other comic-based characters ===
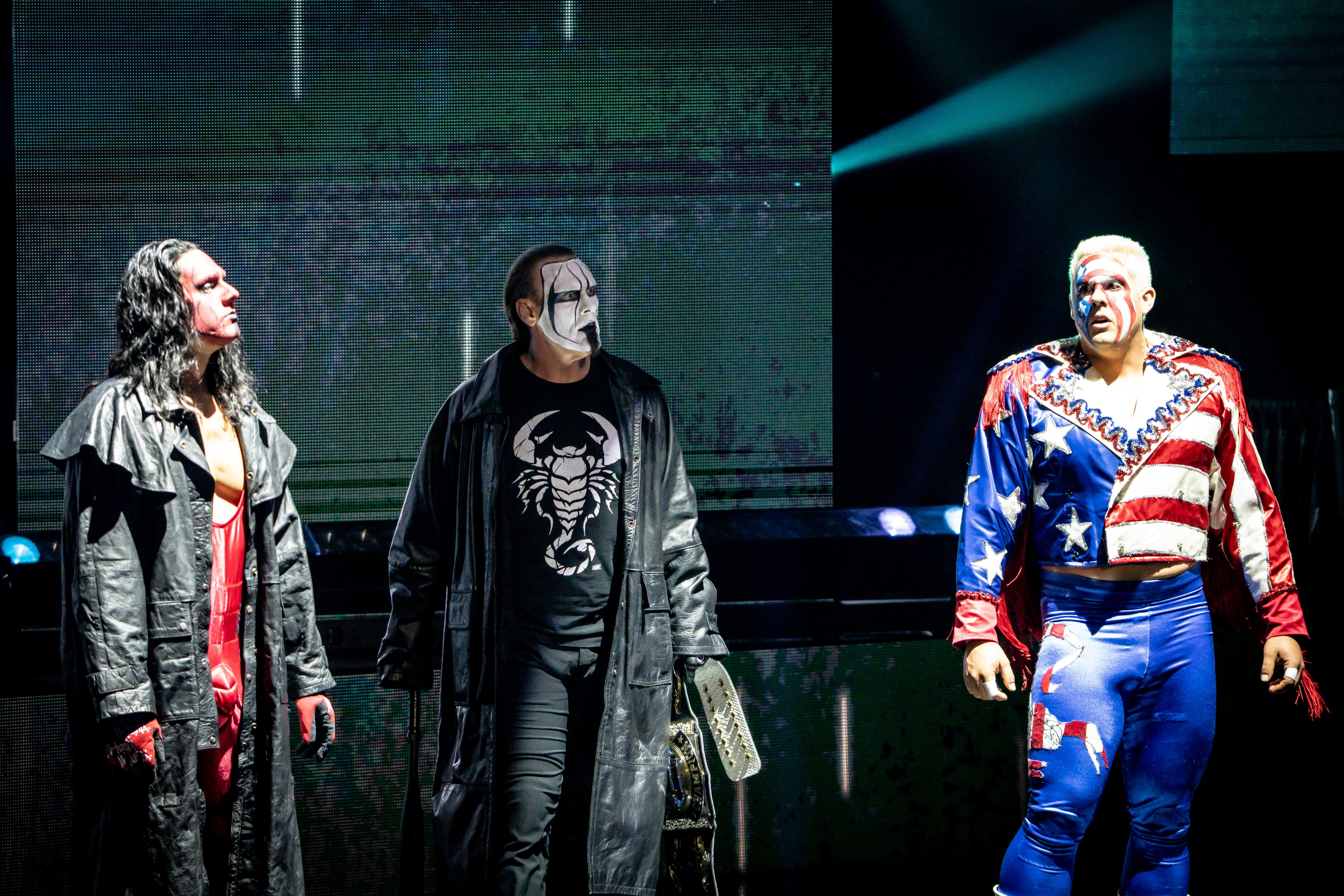
Sting (center) had several gimmick alternations throughout his career. He appears with his sons, who portrayed earlier versions of his gimmick during the entrance to his retirement match.

The theatrical nature of professional wrestling easily blends with comic hero and villain characters, made popular in the 1980s by Ultimate Warrior and Sting, whose character was inspired by the 1994 movie The Crow, based on the comic book of the same name.

Other wrestlers with superhero and supervillain gimmicks include late WWE Hall of Famer Dusty Rhodes' sons Gold and Stardust, Big Van Vader, Bam Bam Bigelow, Pierre Carl Ouellet, Dr. Luther, the magician Phantasio, Icarus, Super Eric, Dexter Lumis, Samoan Rosey during his "the Super Hero in Training" (the S.H.I.T.) phase and his tag-team partner The Hurricane and valet Super Stacy, Earthquake/Avalanche and his tag-team partner Typhoon in The Natural Disasters stable, and most recently, Ember Moon, and tag-teams The Road Warriors, Demolition, KroniK, The Assassins, The Super Assassins, The Machines, and most recently, The Ascension, and The Viking Raiders/War Machine.

Some of these characters are brought during very short periods of time for entertainment value. The Joker and Harley Quinn from the Batman comics have inspired wrestling attire for Sting and Alexa Bliss respectively. Finn Bálor's Demon King persona is visually based on Spider-Man villains Venom and Carnage. Sandman's character name is also based on Spider-Man villain Sandman as well as Rhyno, whose character name was based on a pun on the Spider-Man villain Rhino. Raven's character name was based on DC Comics superhero, Raven. Kenny Omega's taunts were inspired by video games since he was a big fan of them. Mantaur's character name was also based on a pun on the word Minotaur, a half-man, half-bull creature from Greek Mythology. Luchasaurus' character name is a portmanteau of "lucha libre" and "dinosaurus". Tag-team The Super Smash Brothers's name was based on the video game franchise Super Smash Bros. Nikki Cross also changed her gimmick and name like that of a superhero, into Nikki A.S.H. (Almost a Superhero). X-Men character Storm has inspired wrestling attire for Jade Cargill. Kris Statlander's character was originally an alien gimmick, which she was nicknamed "The Galaxy's Greatest Alien" and billed as having come from the Andromeda Galaxy. TNA's Dean Roll's ring name, Shark Boy, became the inspiration for the 3D superhero adventure film, The Adventures of Sharkboy and Lavagirl in 3-D.

=== Supernatural-based characters ===
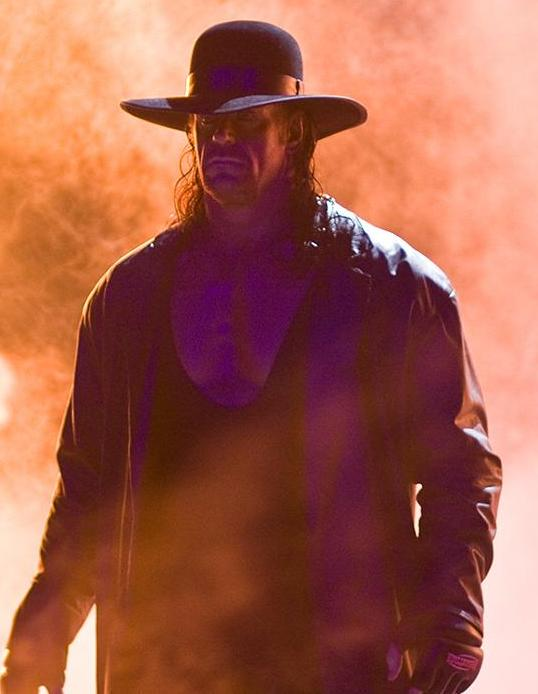
Wrestling Observer Newsletter awarded The Undertaker in "Deadman" form Best Gimmick award a record five times in a row

The Undertaker is considered one of the most respected wrestlers in the business, whose gimmick is a horror-themed character of an undead, macabre and paranormal dark presence prone to scare tactics. He was managed by the ghostly character that was Paul Bearer and tagged with his half-brother Kane in The Brothers of Destruction stable.

Other wrestlers displaying supposed supernatural powers include Matt Hardy (as his Broken/Woken persona), and his younger brother Jeff Hardy (as his Brother Nero/Willow character), Mordecai, Waylon Mercy, Jake "The Snake" Roberts, Papa Shango, The Boogeyman, Abyss, and most recently Asuka, Ember Moon, Aleister Black, and Bray Wyatt's The Fiend, and stables The Three Faces of Fear, and The Dungeon of Doom. Japanese Onryo portrays a dead wrestler who returned for vengeance.

Raven was the leader of five stables; Raven's Nest, The Flock, The Dead Pool, The Gathering, and Serotonin.

The Brood was a vampire stable, composed of Gangrel, Christian and Edge.

Alexa Bliss was also given a different gimmick after her alliance with Bray Wyatt in late 2020s, appearing suddenly and sometimes attacking the other wrestlers, the same things that Bray Wyatt would do.

=== Juggernaut ===
Since its beginnings in the circus circuit, the professional wrestler's stereotype has been that of large, powerful and strong, most notably Kane upon his arrival to the WWF/E. Various wrestlers have banked on the larger size which has influenced their in-ring style and persona.

Notable examples of these kind include Swede Tor Johnson (181 kg), Gorilla Monsoon (182 kg), Giant González (8 ft 0 in), André the Giant (7 ft 4 in), The Great Khali (7 ft 3 in), Big Show (7 ft 2 in), Awesome Kong and Nia Jax (123 kg).

=== Midget ===
Similarly to juggernauts, since its beginnings in the circus circuit, the professional wrestler's stereotype has been that of small, but powerful and strong like those of dwarves of Norse mythology. Various wrestlers have banked on the small size which has influenced their in-ring style and persona.

Notable examples of these kind include the leprechaun Hornswoggle, El Torito and other various dwarfed versions of other various wrestlers.

=== Educational ===
Education is a rare gimmick in wrestling due to the fact that, most times, the wrestler is a former real-life student or scholar of a school, a college, a university, or a TAFE, who also worked as a cheerleader, a coach, a dean, a librarian, a teacher, or even a principal. Wrestlers who used this gimmick include NXT wrestlers, e.g. Alex Riley etc., Bobby "The Brain" Heenan, Dean Douglas, Jonathan Coachman, Michelle McCool's "sexy teacher" character, The Miz's and Jack Swagger's "student" amateur background characters, Damien Sandow's "Intellectual Savior of the Unwashed Masses" character, and "The Librarian" Peter Avalon and his manager Leva Bates, and tag-teams The Steiner Brothers, The Spirit Squad, and most recently, Team Rhodes Scholars, American Alpha, and Chase University.

=== Disability ===
Disability is rare gimmick in wrestling, as wrestlers in real-life will often face discrimination from other wrestlers, as well as the fans themselves. Despite this, it is usually depicted as a heroic gimmick. Zach Gowen usually competes with one leg, due to amputation on his left leg at the age of eight. Gregory Iron was diagnosed with cerebral palsy, which has left his right arm withered and with extremely limited range of motion. Eugene's character was based on a "mentally disabled boy". The film The Peanut Butter Falcon follows a young man with Down syndrome who escapes from an assisted living facility, in order to follow his dream of being a wrestler.

=== Military ===
Military characters are sometimes a villainous gimmick, but is quite rare due to the fact that, most times, the wrestler was formerly part of the real-life military. Wrestlers who use this gimmick include Sgt. Slaughter, and most recently, John Cena, after his acting debut of the film The Marine, and tag-teams The Shield, and The Authors of Pain.

=== Bad News reporter ===
Bad News reporter characters are a villainous gimmick; due to any "bad news" reported to the fans by a "bad guy" (heel); but is quite rare since that fans are not quite interested in it either. Wrestlers who used this gimmick include Bad News Brown, and most recently, "Bad News" Barrett.

=== Religious ===
Religion is often a rare gimmick in professional wrestling due to its controversial nature. Wrestlers who used this gimmick include Friar Ferguson, and most recently, "Bolieve" Bo Dallas, and "The Monday Night Messiah" Seth "Freakin'" Rollins.

=== Hardcore technician ===
Whilst being way beyond over the limit from some sheer violence is scary in some matches, hardcore technician gimmicks are also another popular choice for gimmicks, due to the fans being over with getting used to watching sheer violence as they don't shy away from it either. These include Abdullah the Butcher, and Bruiser Brody, which came popular into other professional wrestling companies like ECW wrestlers, e.g. Terry Funk, Hardcore Holly, New Jack, and Mick Foley/Mankind/Cactus Jack, etc., CZW wrestlers, e.g. John Zandig, Necro Butcher, Wifebeater, Nick Mondo, and Nick Gage, etc., AEW wrestlers, e.g. The Blade and The Butcher, etc., Japanese Wrestlers Atsushi Onita, Toshiaki Kawada, and Jun Kasai, and tag-teams The Motor City Machine Guns, and most recently, The Mechanics, and Heavy Machinery.

=== Music-based characters ===
Music influences are another popular choice for gimmicks. In the 80's, The Honky Tonk Man worked with a Elvisesque character. Elias also works well with his musician guitar character. Rapping was demonstrated by R-Truth/K-Kwik's original rapper character along with Road Dogg and John Cena worked during the first years of his career with a rapper gimmick. AEW tag team The Acclaimed also begin each of their matches with a different rap. Other music genre types were demonstrated by CM Punk's straight edge iconoclast hardcore punk, party boys No Way Jose and Adam Rose, Cameron Grimes, Rick Boogs, Rockstar Spud, Heath Slater, Lance Archer, Chris Jericho, Jeff Jarrett, Marty Jannetty, Disco Inferno, One Man Gang, Buck Zumhofe, WWE's Brodus Clay and his fun-loving, funk dancing gimmick "The Funkasaurus" and Fandango who includes salsa dancing in his routine, and AEW's Jack Evans who usually does breakdancing in the ring during entrances or when he's won a match, and tag-teams The Public Enemy, Badd Company, The Rockers, The Rock 'n' Roll Express, The Rhythm and Blues, and most recently, The Vaudevillains. AEW's Adam Williams is also a professional wrestler and a real-life guitarist.

=== Comedy ===
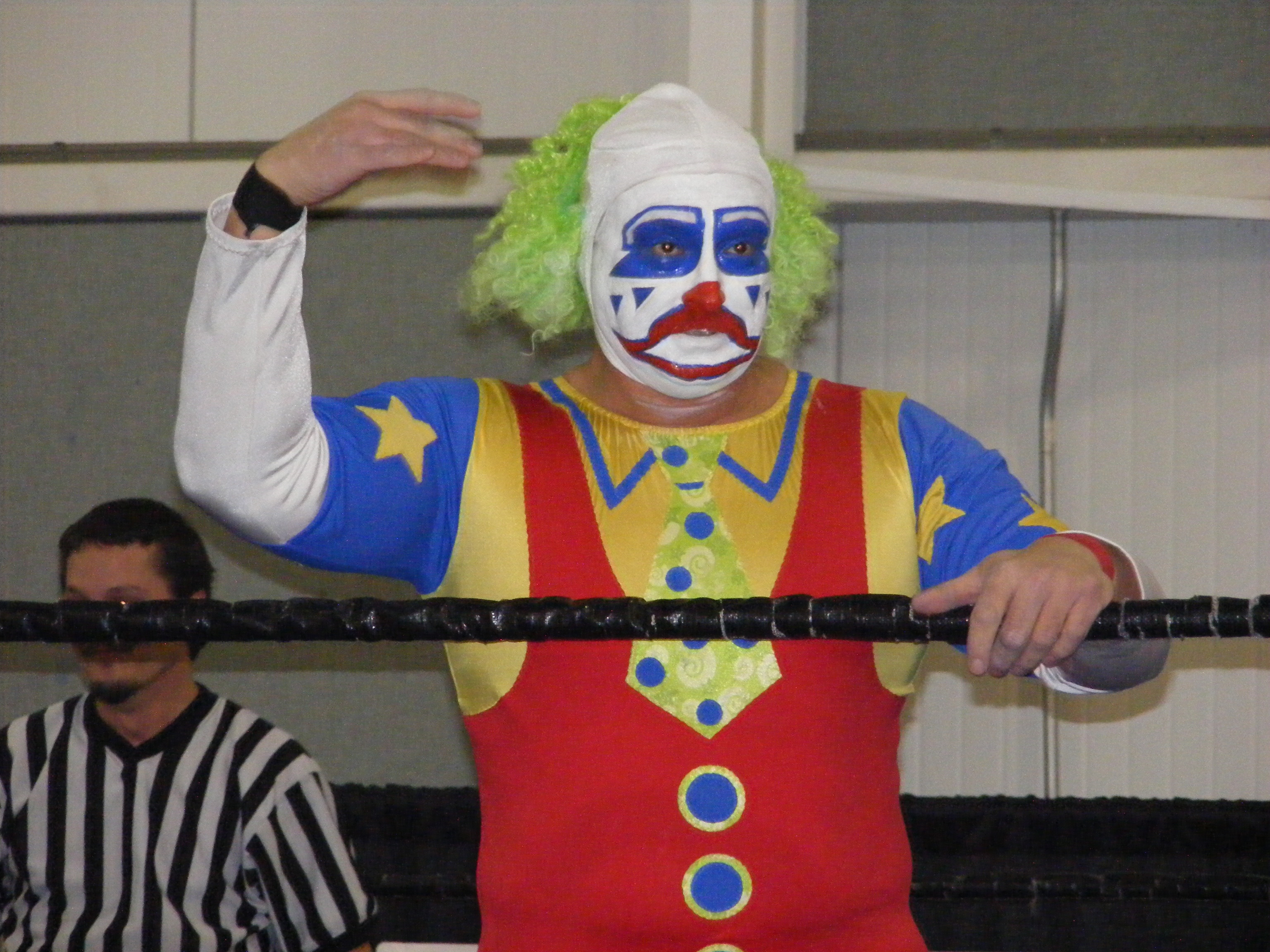
Doink the Clown is a comedic gimmick that has been used by several wrestlers

Whilst humor has long been present in professional wrestling matches and many wrestlers incorporate elements of comedy in their act, full-on comedic gimmicks are not commonly seen. These are sometimes reserved for wrestlers who not always have the stereotypical physique required in the industry and instead exploit their entertainment abilities.

Initiated by English wrestler Les Kellett, wrestlers who fall under this category are Doink The Clown which was majorly portrayed by Matt Osborne until his death in 2013, which inspired others like Scottish comedian and actor Grado, Ring of Honor's Colt Cabana, Santino Marella, James Ellsworth, and Eugene's "mentally disabled boy" character, Japanese Wrestlers Stalker Ichikawa, Gran Naniwa, Kuishinbo Kamen and Toru Yano, Charlie Haas during his impersonations run, and WWE's 1990s turkey character Gobbledy Gooker, and rooster character Red Rooster, WCW's Brian Pillman, and Al Snow along with his mannequin prop called "Head" which he used as a sidekick companion during segments while addressing the fans. And recently, The New Day pursued a joyous gimmick, giving them a character heavily associated with the fans. Damien Sandow also falls under this category due to his 'stunt double' gimmick in late 2014 where he copied whatever his on-screen mentor The Miz did, due to the latter using a gimmick of an arrogant movie star. R-Truth also influenced his character with some of his comedic activities, such as breaking out a joke, dancing and finding out his opponent to win the 24/7 Championship in a strange and funny way.

=== Charity ===
Characters who do charity are depicted as a heroic gimmick due to real-life charity. Wrestlers who used this gimmick include Sweet Daddy Siki, Brother Love, "Make a Difference" Fatu, Dude Love, and most recently, "The Doctor of Hug-o-nomics" Bayley, and tag-team Men on a Mission.

=== Self-absorbed ===
Usually a villainous gimmick, initiated by Gorgeous George, due to the jealousy of the good looks the fans want to have for themselves. Wrestlers that followed on with this trend include Sonny Kiss, Angel Garza, "The Untouchable" Carmella, Lana with her catchphrase, "I am the best in the world", "Dashing" Cody Rhodes, "The Black Machismo" Jay Lethal, "The Artist Collective" Sami Zayn, "The Masterpiece" Chris Masters, "Big League" Byron Saxton, "The Swiss Superman" Antonio Cesaro, Dolph Ziggler with his "perfection" gimmick, The Miz with his catchphrase, "AWESOME", Randy Orton, "The Glamazon" Beth Phoenix, Carlito Caribbean Cool, "The Phenomenal" AJ Styles, "Glorious" Bobby Roode, "The Almighty" Bobby Lashley, "The Gold Standard" Shelton Benjamin, Scotty 2 Hotty, "The Rated R Superstar" Edge, The "Great One" Rock, "The World's Strongest Man" Mark Henry, Val Venis, "The Heartbreak Kid" Shawn Michaels, "Big Sexy" Kevin Nash, Lex Luger's "The Narcissist" character, "Beautiful" Bobby Eaton, Ravishing Rick Rude, "The Model" Rick Martel, "Adorable" Adrian Adonis, Hulk Hogan, "Macho Man" Randy Savage, Jesse "The Body" Ventura, "The Nature Boy" Ric Flair and his daughter, "Handsome" Harley Race, "Classy" Freddie Blassie, AEW's "Pretty" Peter Avalon, and Powerhouse Hobbs, TNA's Mr Pec-tacular, Brian Christopher's Grand Master Sexay, Billy Gunn's Mr Ass, Curt Hennig's Mr Perfect, Paul Orndorff's Mr Wonderful, NXT's Tyler Breeze, Lacey Evans, and "The Finest" Kona Reeves, and tag-teams The Mexicools, and Too Cool, as well as women's tag-teams The Beautiful People, LayCool, Fire and Desire, and The IIconics.

=== Hollywood movie star ===
Hollywood movie stars are occasionally villainous due to fame outside of wrestling as a real-life Hollywood actor/actress. These include "Hollywood" Hulk Hogan, The Rock, and most recently, Batista, John Cena, The Miz, and David Otunga's A-list character, and tag-teams The Hollywood Blondes, and MNM, and most recently, The Bollywood Boyz, despite being of Indian descent and being billed from the famous Indian filming district of Bollywood, Mumbai (Bombay), instead which they were named after (although the name "Bollywood" was borrowed from the word "Hollywood" but with a "B" instead of a "H" to describe a famous filming district in Mumbai (Bombay), in India, which it was named after).

=== Authority figure-based characters ===
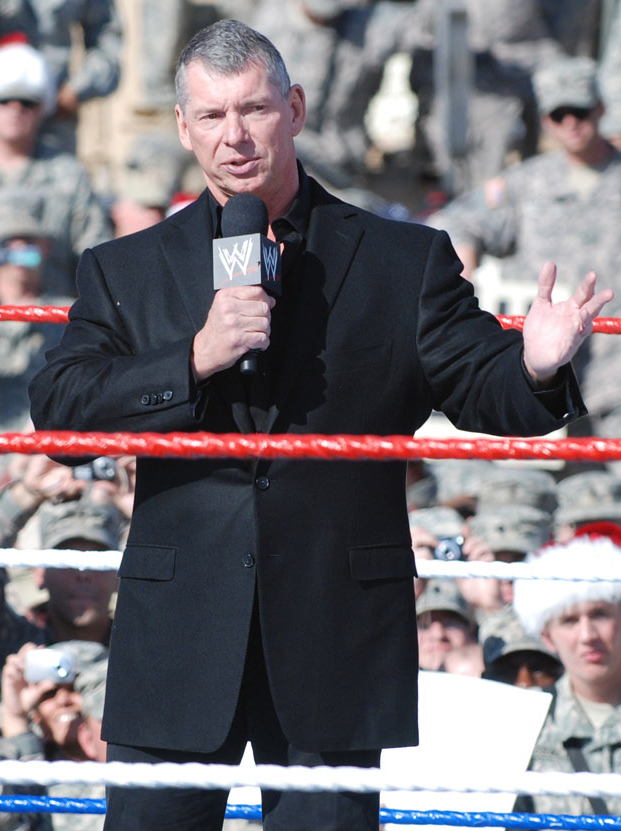
WWE promoter Vince McMahon regularly portrayed a heel onscreen authority figure

Authority figures are apparently villainous but sometimes as heroic characters as wrestlers and non-wrestlers (e.g. referees, general managers, security, police, etc.) as well depending on the storyline. Some wrestlers also use a character based on an authority over other people. These include non-wrestlers like managers, and wrestlers like The Mountie, Big Boss Man, "The Alpha Male" Marcus Cor Von, Consequences Creed, "The Man" Becky Lynch, "The Boss" Sasha Banks, Sean O'Haire's devil advocate gimmick, and David Otunga's legal adviser character, ECW's 911, and stables New World Order, Right to Censor, The Truth Commission, The Acolytes Protection Agency, 3-Minute Warning, and most recently, The Authority.

=== Money-based characters (Evil billionaire/Millionaire tyrant) ===
Money-based villains are often inordinately wealthy or discriminatory against those who are not rich. The original gimmick of this type was created by "Million Dollar Man" Ted DiBiase, which consequently inspired wrestlers like his son, which includes being owners of the promotion, like Mr. McMahon and his family (including his son and daughter (since they are the real owners of WWE)), and most recently, "The Dream" Velveteen Dream, and stables The Diamond Exchange, The Beverly Brothers, The Million Dollar Corporation, Money Inc., Beer Money, Inc., and most recently, The Prime Time Players, The Street Profits, and The Hurt Business. JBL used his real-life work as Wall Street investor as base for his JBL character.

=== Ruthless ruler ===
Similarly to evil billionaire/millionaire tyrant characters, and even authority figures, ruthless ruler characters are mostly a villainous gimmick based on real-life royals, imperials, empires, monarchs, or around other non-royal characters, like bureaucrats, aristocrats, diplomats, nobles, and gents. Wrestlers who originally used this gimmick include Lord Alfred Hayes, which inspired others like Baron von Raschke, "King" James Valiant, The Duke of Dorchester, Jerry "The King" Lawler, The Sultan, King Booker, Hunter Hearst Helmsley, Prince Nana, Tiger Ali Singh's rich and arrogant Asiatic heir character and his manservant Babu, William Regal's arrogant royal noble English ambassador character and his manager Sir William, and most recently, Dalton Castle, Gentleman Jack Gallagher, Baron Corbin who uses the gimmick of a villainous and an evil king, after winning the 2019 king of the ring tournament, but lost to Shinsuke Nakamura who is using the gimmick like that of the Japanese emperor after winning the "Battle For The Crown" against Corbin, Roman Reigns who is using the gimmick of the head of the table and the tribal chief, representing his tribe, upon his heel turn, Jinder Mahal as the Modern Maharaja, associating with his Indian ancestry, Apollo Crews as a proud representative of Nigeria, and Alberto Del Rio's arrogant rich Mexican aristocrat character and his personal ring announcer, Ricardo Rodriguez, and stables The Nation of Domination, The Kings of Wrestling, The British Invasion, The British Bulldogs, The Blue Bloods, Los Conquistadores, and most recently, The Kingdom, The Undisputed Era, and The Imperium.

=== Hated crime gang/Terrorist thugs/Bad guy bandits/Mafia mobsters ===
Hated crime gangsters, terrorist thugs, bad guy bandits, mafia mobsters etc. all work well as a villainous gimmick due to real-life crime gangs, terrorists, bandits, and mobsters, but has also become a more popular gimmick among heroes, partially due to being over with fans who seem to be more malevolent towards the heels, even if the later are trying to be friendly or polite. These include Razor Ramon, The Brooklyn Brawler, Stone Cold Steve Austin, Eddie Guerrero and Chavo Guerrero with their catchphrase, "I lie, I cheat, I steal"/"We lie, We cheat, We steal", "Brutal" Bob Evans, Beer City Bruiser, Shannon Moore, John Cena's "thug nature" character, and most recently, Eddie Edwards, Sami Callihan, Darby Allin, Hikaru Shida (with her yakuza gimmick), and Bandido, and tag-teams Cryme Tyme, D-Generation X, The New Age Outlaws, The Disciples of Apocalypse, The Gangstas/The Gangstanators, FBI, LAX, Mexican America, La Familia, The Forever Hooligans, and most recently, Riott Squad, The Forgotten Sons, Social Outcasts, Enzo Amore and Big Cass, Sanity, Aces & Eights, The Bullet Club, and Retribution.

=== Animals/Animal-based characters ===
Professional wrestling is also considered to be a circus as well, as animals also engaged as opponents, as well as being gimmicks in matches, and mascots for wrestlers as well. These include bears like Terrible Ted, tigers, cheetahs, orangutans, monkeys like Japanese macaques, cats, dogs like Matilda the bulldog, owned as a mascot by the tag-team The British Bulldogs, and was replaced by another bulldog named Winston, pigs, which are brought by Hillbilly Jim, as in the Pig (or Hog) Pen match, birds like Frankie the macaw, who was accompanied by "Birdman" Koko B. Ware, and snakes like Damien the python, who was the pet of Jake "The Snake" Roberts.

== Other usage ==
- Within professional wrestling in insider usage the word 'gimmick' has come to refer to an array of other related terms, including any weapon or foreign object used during a match or the scripted quality of a match.
- In backstage lingo, gimmick is also a stand-in for basically any physical noun or set of moves in a match.
- Gimmicked is used to describe an object that is altered or rigged for use in a match. For example, a gimmicked table or chair which would be precut or made to fall apart more easily.
- An event that is referred to as a gimmick event is one that is centred around a match type, such as the pay-per-view events WWE Hell in a Cell and WWE TLC: Tables, Ladders, & Chairs.
- The term is also a euphemism for hormone-enhancing drugs, namely steroids and growth hormone, which have historically been linked to the sport.
- It has also been used by people in the profession to describe casual marijuana use, as wrestlers will refer to 'smoking the gimmick'.

== See also ==
- Glossary of professional wrestling terms
- Kayfabe
