= John Capouya =

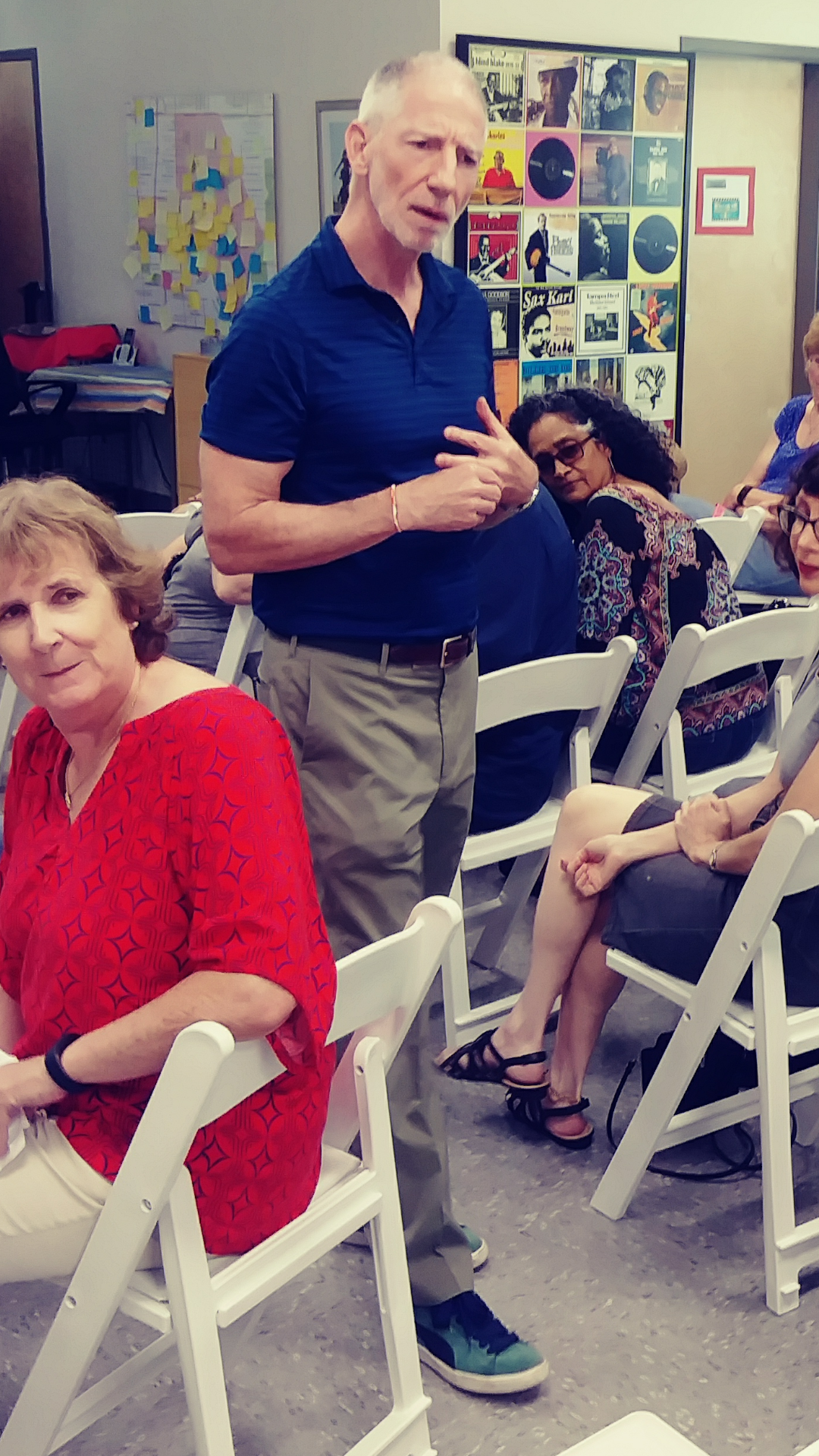
John Capouya at a presentation on the history Florida Blues and Soul music at the Sulphur Springs History and Heritage Museum in February 2019

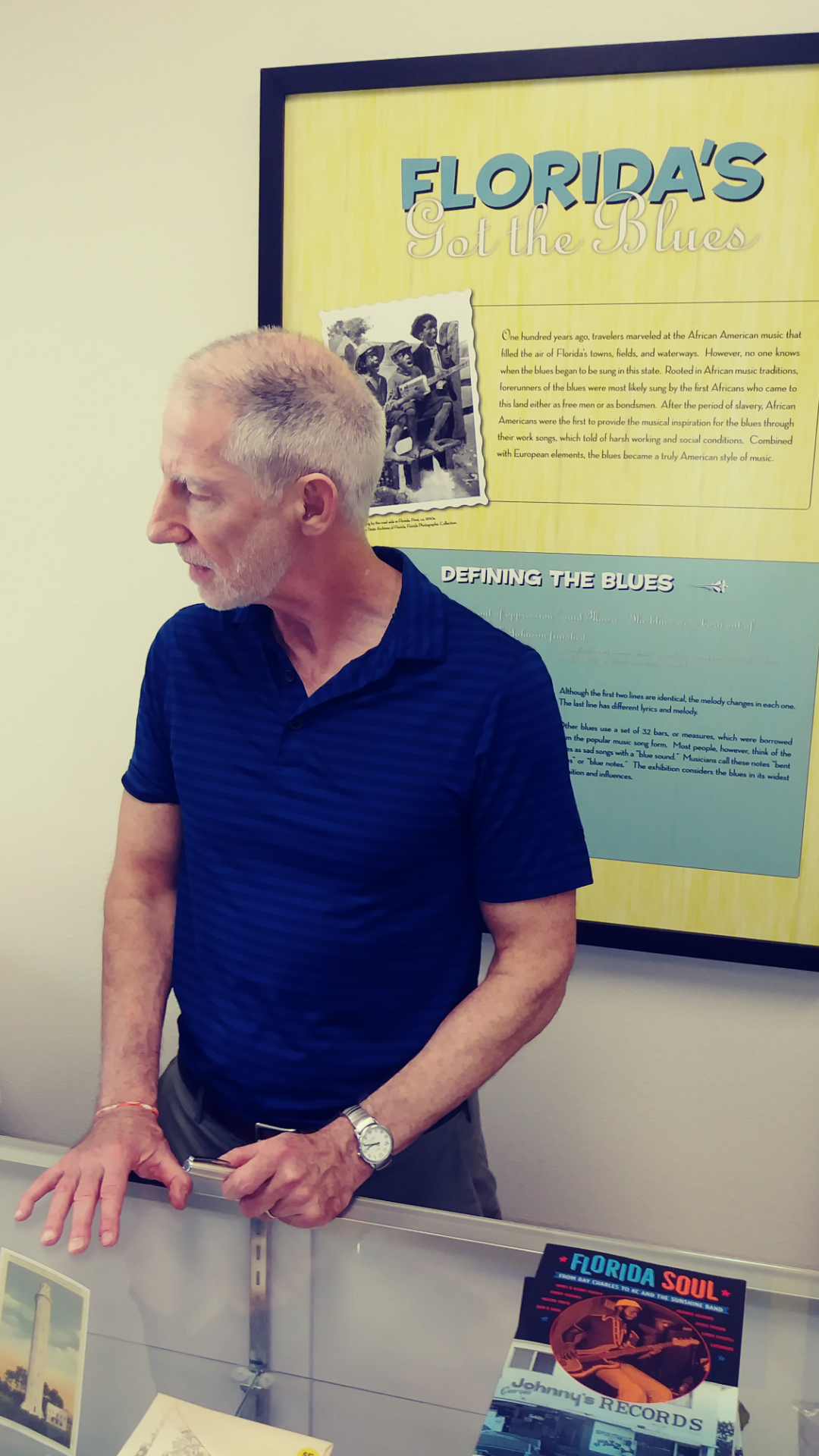
Same event different angle next to his book Florida Soul

John Capouya (born March 27, 1956) is an author and professor of journalism and non-fiction writing at the University of Tampa in Tampa, Florida. During his career in journalism he worked at Newsweek, The New York Times, SmartMoney, and New York Newsday. He wrote the books Florida Blues, Gorgeous George, and Real Men Do Yoga. He has also written for various publications, including Sports Illustrated, Life, Tampa Bay Times, and Travel & Leisure. Capouya is married to Suzanne Williamson, an artist and photographer. They split their time between Tampa and New York City and have been contributed together to Panhandler Magazine.

Capouya graduated with B.A. degrees in English and French from Grinnell College in 1978. He received an M.S. from Columbia University in 1981.

Capouya's book Florida Soul delves into Floridiaj Blues musicians and their stories. Featured artists include Timmy Thomas. Capouya notes that there is not a recognizable commonality across Florida soul music but that distinctive traits include Latin musical influences on Miami musicians such as K.C. & the Sunshine Band, a musical school for the blind where Ray Charles studied and in turn helped other aspiring musicians, and Florida A&M's marching band. He also discusses Deep City Records, an African American owned label out of the Liberty City neighborhood in Miami.

Capouya explores the influence Gorgeous George had on pop culture and other pop culture figures in his book on the flamboyant wrestler.

== Bibliography ==
- Florida Soul: From Ray Charles to KC and the Sunshine Band
- Gorgeous George: The Outrageous Bad-Boy Wrestler Who Created American Pop Culture
- Real Men Do Yoga: 21 Star Athletes Reveal Their Secrets for Strength, Flexibility and Peak Performance
