= Sulphur Springs Water Tower =

Landmark of Tampa, Florida

Coordinates: 28.021397°N 82.458897°W

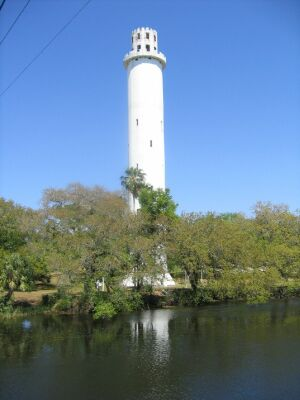
The Sulphur Springs Water Tower

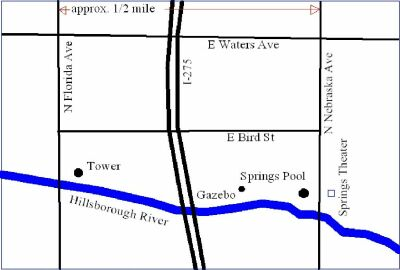
The tower sits on a 13-acre tract of land on the Hillsborough River.

Sulphur Springs Water Tower is a landmark of Tampa, Florida. It stands 214 feet (65 m) tall, with a foundation 45 feet (14 m) deep which makes it visible from nearby Interstate 275 and much of the rest of Sulphur Springs. It's located in the historic district of Sulphur Springs.

== History ==
=== Modern history ===
The water tower was built in 1927 by Grover Poole for realtor and developer Josiah S. Richardson to supply adequate water pressure to the Sulphur Springs Hotel and Apartments and Mave's Arcade Richardson had developed next to Sulphur Spring with plans to expand the resort spa, alligator farm tourist attraction, and other enterprises. Mave's Arcade occupied the first floor of the hotel building and was the first shopping mall in Florida.

Richardson mortgaged the entire resort ($180,000 at the time) to finance the construction of the tower. However, in 1933, with the sabotage and collapse of the Tampa Electric Company dam that ripped through downtown Tampa during the Depression (draining cow pasture land that had been inconveniently flooded by the dam's construction), the arcade was heavily damaged, the businesses in the arcade failed, and Richardson lost everything.

From construction until 1971, the water tower operated as a private water company piping artesian well water to commercial and residential customers in the immediate vicinity. The tower is built over the opening of an artesian well and the water well and pumps are located under the tower itself. Another building was on the property which housed fluoridation and filtering equipment when the water company was in business piping artesian well water directly to customers. In 1971 the owner of the water company and tower was "The Estate of J.F. Hendricks" (several beneficiaries under his will including surviving relatives). They were forced by the City of Tampa in 1971 to cease water piping operations so that the city's water utility company could maintain a monopoly over the business of piping water to citizens.

In 1951, the Tower Drive-In theater opened adjacent to the tower property to the east. An aircraft warning light atop the tower (since removed) was said to have interfered with movie viewing.

In the mid-1980s there was a move to develop the property as a condominium or high-end apartment complex, with the tower preserved as its centerpiece. Ultimately, the project fell through. In 1989 the tower was restored: it was pressure washed and painted with 150 gallons of "graffiti proof paint" donated by Sherwin-Williams Co. with labor donated by Service Painting Corp.

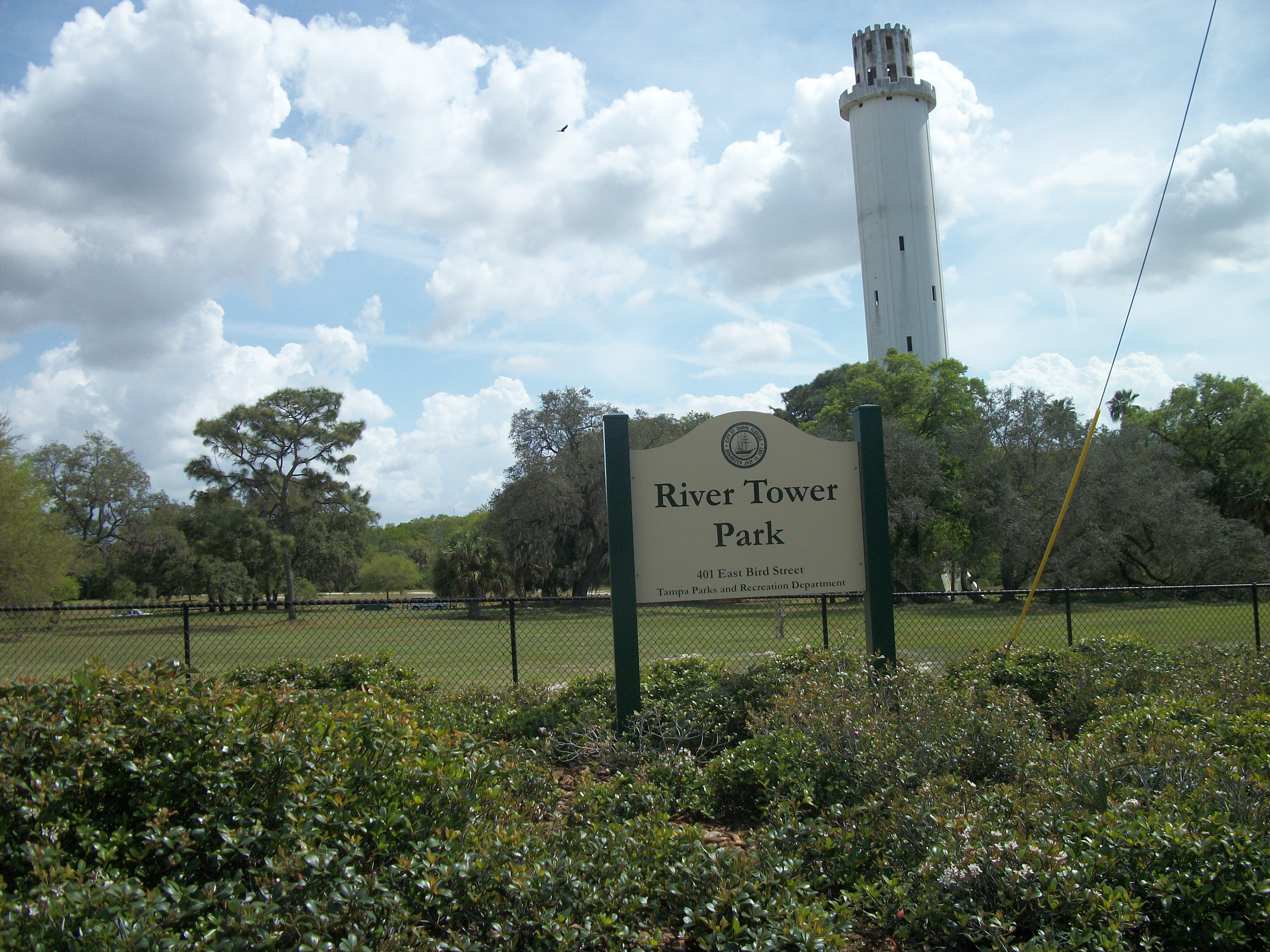
Sign for River Tower Park along US Bus Route 41.

2002 saw a bid by a large chain drugstore to build on the site, but public outcry killed the project. The site was subsequently purchased by the City of Tampa who in 2005 installed lights for nighttime illumination. In what is now called River Tower Park, there is a limited one-lane access road off Bird Street, no facilities and a small parking lot. The planned River Walkway decking has been completed and now connects River Tower park to Sulphur Springs park under Interstate highway 275.

== Architecture ==
The structure is constructed from poured concrete using railroad rails for "rebar"; the walls are eight inches (200 mm) thick with a buttressed base on solid rock. "Concrete was poured into forms that were raised by yokes and jacks – 10 feet (3.0 m) went up a day. The tower rests on rock, has cantilever foundation, and with the buttresses will be rather a difficult job to ever destroy," wrote Poole. When it was operational it stored 200,000 gallons of water pumped up from the nearby artesian springs. The water tank occupies the upper quarter of the cylindrical tower while seven floors, one room per floor, constitute the lower three quarters. Original construction included an electric passenger elevator.
