= Sulphur Springs (Tampa) =

- Neighborhood
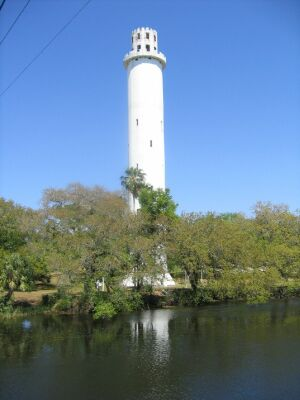
- The Sulphur Springs Water Tower

- Location within the state of Florida
- Coordinates: 28°1′15″N 82°27′05″W
- Country: United States
- State: Florida
- County: Hillsborough
- City: Tampa
- Elevation: 16 ft (4.9 m)

Population (2010)
  - Total: 5,727
- Time zone: UTC-5 (Eastern (EST))
  - Summer (DST): UTC-4 (EDT)
- ZIP codes: 33604
- Area code: 813

Sulphur Springs is a neighborhood and district located within the city limits of Tampa, Florida. At the time of the 2010 census, there were 5,727 residents, down somewhat from the 2000 census count of 6,308. In the late 19th century the mineral springs were a draw. In the 1940s, the area was a major tourist attraction, featuring a 40-foot water slide and gator farm. Today, one of the primary draws to the area is Busch Gardens Tampa, a world-famous animal theme park and amusement park, located only 2.8 miles from Sulphur Springs. It is also the location of the Sulphur Springs History and Heritage Museum. Other nearby attractions and institutions include Adventure Island (water park), The Florida Aquarium, the Museum of Science & Industry and the Universities of South Florida (USF) and Tampa (UT).

== Description ==
The area is well-known for the Sulphur Springs Water Tower, built in 1927. The community was annexed into Tampa in 1953. The neighborhood was once known for being a mineral springs-tourist attraction, primarily a draw for the middle- and working-classes.

Another widely-known landmark was the Sulphur Springs Hotel and Arcade (originally owned by Josiah T. Richardson), considered to be the first indoor shopping center in the state of Florida. It was situated near the Hillsborough River, at the intersection of Nebraska Avenue and Bird Street (on the southwest corner). Constructed from 1926 to 1927, the hotel-shopping center took up an entire city block. It represented an excellent example of the resort-style recreation facilities which became popular around the early 20th century. The most distinguishing feature of the hotel was its first and second floor front arcade in the classical style.

In 1951, a drive-in theater opened next to the Sulphur Springs Water Tower. The Tower Theatre, as it was called, was a popular drive-in that operated for nearly 40 years. The theater, with its visible neon signage, became yet another well-known Tampa landmark featuring a location facing the Hillsborough River (between Florida and Nebraska Avenue). The "neon tower" was designed after its nearby namesake.

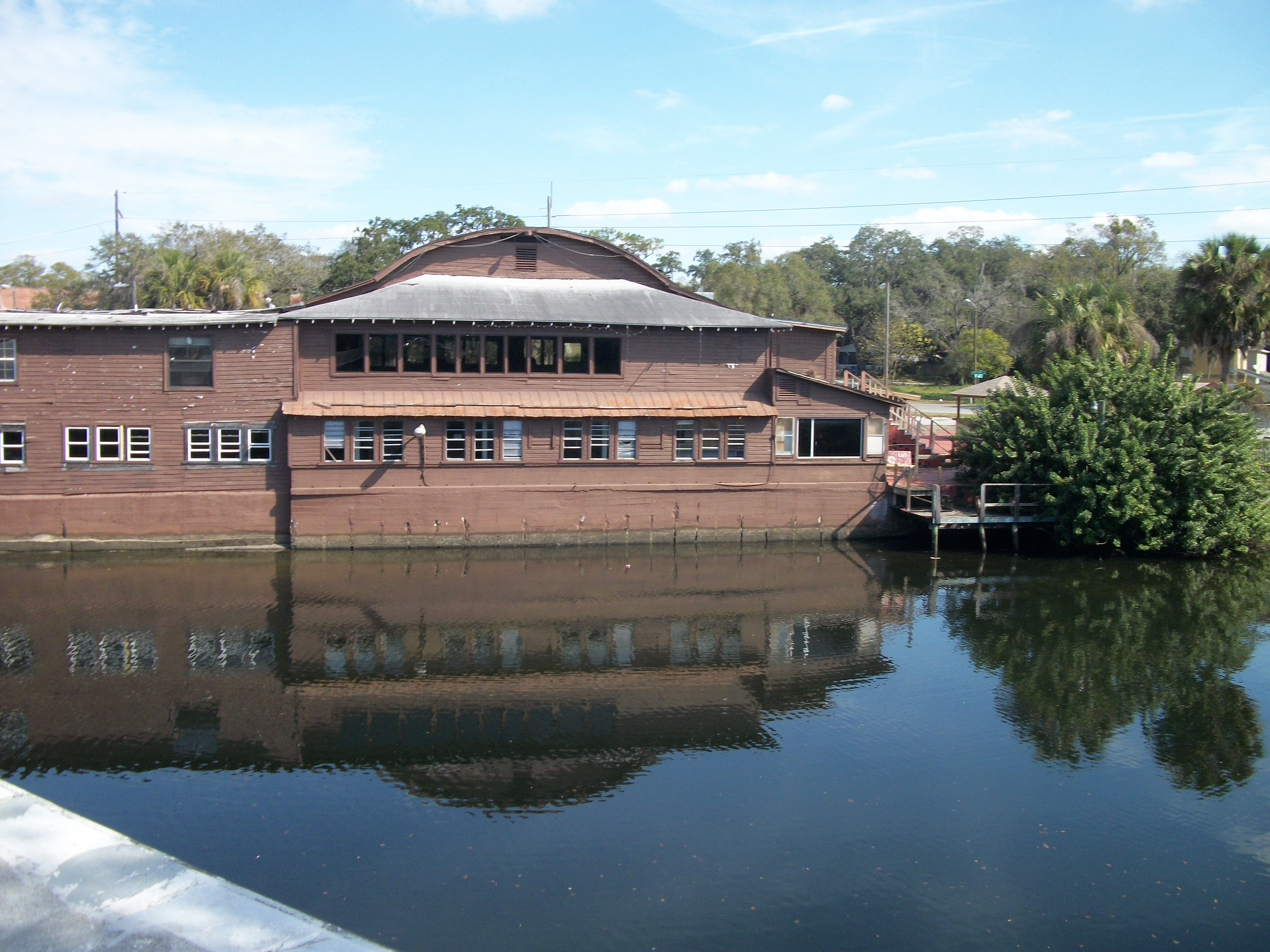
The former Sulphur Springs Tourist Club (later becoming a restaurant & nightclub), overlooking the Hillsborough River. Photo is from at least 2012, prior to being destroyed by fire in 2014.

== Geography ==
Sulphur Springs is located at (28.02500, −82.45111), or about five miles north of downtown Tampa. The community has an elevation of 16 feet above sea level. Sulphur Springs boundaries include Rowlett Park to the east, Florida Avenue to the west, Busch Blvd. to the north, and the Hillsborough River to the south

== Demographics ==
As of the census of 2010, there were 5,727 people living in the neighborhood. The racial makeup of the neighborhood was 31.1% White, 62.2% Black, 0.4% Native American, 0.5% Asian, 2.4% other races, and 3.4% from two or more races. Hispanic or Latino of any race were 18.6% of the population.

== See also ==
- Neighborhoods in Tampa, Florida
