= Gorgeous George =

American professional wrestler (1915–1963)

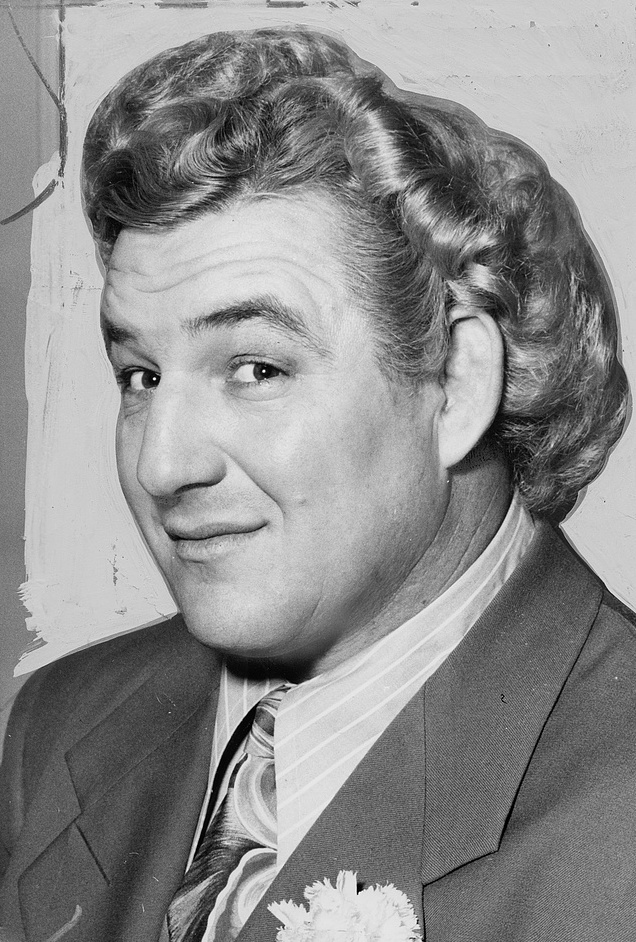
- George in the 1950s

Personal information
- Born: George Raymond Wagner; March 24, 1915 Butte, Nebraska, U.S.
- Died: December 26, 1963 (aged 48) Los Angeles, California, U.S.
- Spouses: Betty Hanson (m. 1939, divorced); Cherie Dupré (m. 1951; div. 1962)
- Family: Robert Kellum (grandnephew)

Professional wrestling career
- Ring names: George Wagner; Gorgeous George
- Billed height: 5 ft 9 in (175 cm)
- Billed weight: 215 lb (98 kg)
- Debut: 1932
- Retired: November 7, 1962

George Raymond Wagner (March 24, 1915 – December 26, 1963), known by his ring name Gorgeous George, was an American professional wrestler. In the United States, during the "First Golden Age" of professional wrestling (1940s–1950s), Gorgeous George was one of the biggest stars of the sport, gaining media attention for his outrageous character, which was described as flamboyant and charismatic. He was a major national celebrity at his peak, and was a pioneer of early entertainment television. He was posthumously inducted into the Professional Wrestling Hall of Fame in 2002 and the WWE Hall of Fame as part of the Class of 2010.

== Early life ==
Wagner, of German heritage, was born March 24, 1915, in Butte, Nebraska. For a time, his family lived on a farm near the village of Phoenix in Holt County and probably in Seward County, before they moved to Waterloo, Iowa and later Sioux City. When he was 7 years old, Wagner's family moved to Houston, Texas, where he associated with kids from a tough neighborhood. As a child, he trained at the local YMCA and often staged matches against his friends.

In 1929, he dropped out of Milby High School at 14, and worked odd jobs to help support his family. At this time, he competed at carnivals, where he could earn 35 cents for a win. At age 17, he was getting booked by the region's top promoter, Morris Siegel. In 1938, he won his first title by defeating Buck Lipscomb for Northwest Middleweight crown. On May 19, 1939, he captured the Pacific Coast Light Heavyweight Championship.

== Professional wrestling career ==
At 5 feet 9 inches (1.75 m) tall and weighing 215 pounds (98 kg), Wagner was not especially physically imposing by professional wrestling standards, nor was he an exceptional athlete, although he was a gifted amateur wrestler. Nevertheless, he soon developed a reputation as a solid in-ring wrestler. In the late 1930s, he met Elizabeth "Betty" Hanson, whom he later married in an in-ring ceremony. When the wedding proved a good drawing card, the couple re-enacted it in arenas across the country, enlightening Wagner to the potential entertainment value that was left untapped within the industry. Around this same time, Vanity Fair magazine published a feature article about a professional wrestler named "Lord" Patrick Lansdowne, who entered the ring accompanied by two valets while wearing a velvet robe and doublet. Wagner was impressed with the bravado of such a character, but he believed that he could take it to a much greater extreme.

Subsequently, Wagner debuted his new "glamour boy" persona at a 1941 card in Eugene, Oregon. He quickly antagonized fans with his exaggerated, effeminate behavior when the ring announcer introduced him as "Gorgeous George". Such showmanship was unheard of at the time. Consequently, arena crowds grew in size as fans turned out to ridicule Wagner, who relished the sudden attention.

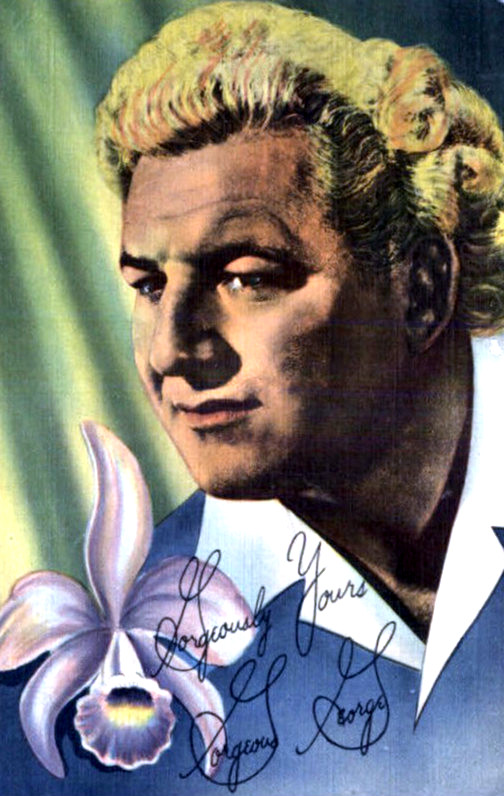
Photo postcard of Gorgeous George, "the Human Orchid" and the "Toast of the Coast", circa 1940s.

Gorgeous George was soon recruited to Los Angeles by promoter Johnny Doyle. Known as the "Human Orchid", his persona was created in part by growing his hair long, dyeing it platinum blonde, and putting gold-plated bobby pins in it, which he called "Georgie Pins" and distributed to the audience. He transformed his ring entrance into a bona fide spectacle that would often take up more time than his actual matches. He strolled nobly to the ring to the sounds of "Pomp and Circumstance", followed by his valet and a purple spotlight. Wearing an elegant robe sporting an array of sequins, Gorgeous George was always escorted down a personal red carpet by his ring valet "Jeffries", who carried a silver mirror while spreading rose petals at his feet. While Wagner removed his robe, Jeffries would spray the ring with disinfectant, ostensibly Chanel No. 5 perfume, which Wagner referred to as "Chanel #10" ("Why be half-safe?" he was famous for saying) before he would start wrestling.

George instructed his valets to spray the referee's hands before the official was permitted to check him for illegal objects. This led to his well-known line, "Get your filthy hands off me!". During matches, he regularly used underhanded tactics to gain an advantage. His catchphrase was "Win if you can, lose if you must, but always cheat!". His flamboyant persona and ability to engage audiences helped make him one of the most recognizable professional wrestlers of the early television era.

The advent of television was a pivotal development for professional wrestling, establishing Wagner's in-ring persona as a preeminent commercial draw within the industry. As television networks sought cost-effective programming to fill airtime, professional wrestling's blend of athletic spectacle and theatrical performance gained significant traction with the viewing public, becoming one of the medium's first reliably profitable ventures. Within this context, Gorgeous George served as a primary catalyst for the sport's integration into mainstream American popular culture; his histrionic performance style and melodramatic character work transformed him into a prominent cultural icon of the era.

His first television appearance took place on November 11, 1947, an event that was named among the top 100 televised acts of the 20th century by Entertainment Weekly. He immediately became a national celebrity at the same level of Lucille Ball and Bob Hope, who personally donated hundreds of chic robes for George's collection, while changing the course of the industry. No longer was pro-wrestling simply about the in-ring action. Wagner created a new sense of theatrics and character performance that had not previously existed. In a very real sense, it was Gorgeous George who single-handedly established television as a viable entertainment medium that could potentially reach millions of homes across the country. It is said that George was probably responsible for selling as many television receivers as Milton Berle.

In addition to his grandiose theatrics, Gorgeous George was an accomplished wrestler. While many may have considered him a mere gimmick wrestler, he was actually a very competent freestyle wrestler, having started learning the sport in amateur wrestling as a teenager, and he could handle himself quite well if it came to a legitimate contest. The great Lou Thesz, who took the AWA title away from Wagner, and who was one of the best "legit" wrestlers ever in professional wrestling, displayed some disdain for the gimmick wrestlers. Nevertheless, he admitted that Wagner "could wrestle pretty well", but added that, "he [Wagner] could never draw a fan until he became Gorgeous George."

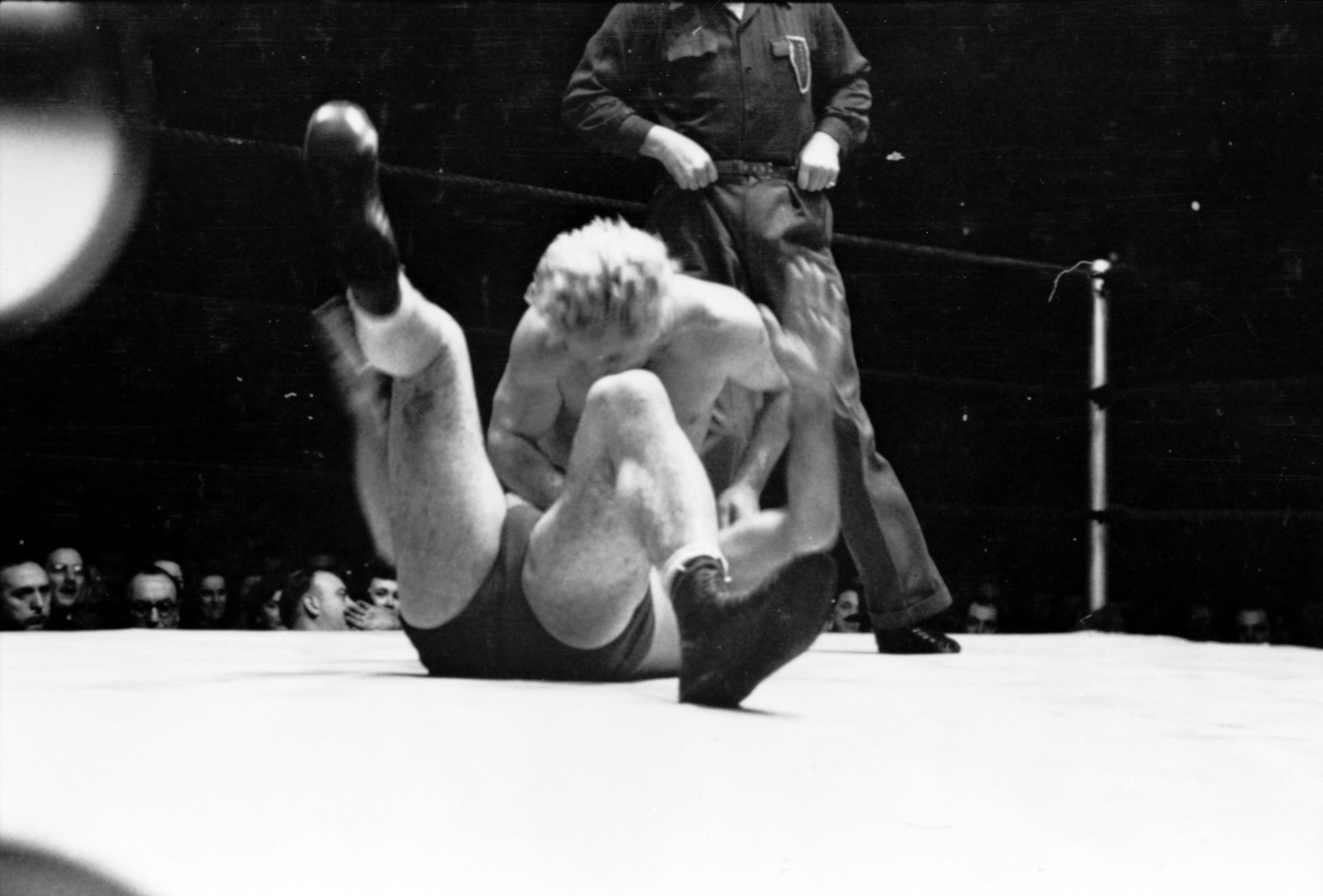
George attempting to pin another wrestler during a match, 1949

Highlight reel of Gorgeous George – first demonstrating his character before transitioning to footage of him performing in the ring. (No Sound)

On March 26, 1947, Wagner defeated Enrique Torres to capture the Los Angeles Heavyweight Championship. On February 22, 1949, he was booked as the feature attraction at New York City's Madison Square Garden in what was pro wrestling's first return to the building in 12 years. By the 1950s, Gorgeous George's star power was so large that he was able to command 50% of the gate for his performances, which allowed him to earn over $100,000 a year, making him one of the highest-paid athletes in the world. On May 26, 1950, Gorgeous George defeated Don Eagle to claim the AWA World Heavyweight Championship (Boston version), which he held for several months.

During this reign, he was beaten by National Wrestling Alliance World Champion Thesz in a highly publicized bout in Chicago. Gorgeous George's perhaps most famous match was against his longtime rival Whipper Billy Watson on March 12, 1959, in which a beaten George had his treasured golden locks shaved bald before 20,000 fans at Toronto's Maple Leaf Gardens and millions more who watched the match on CBC Television.

In one of his final matches, Gorgeous George later faced off against, and lost to, an up-and-coming Bruno Sammartino. He lost his precious hair again, when he was defeated by the Destroyer in a hair vs. mask match at the Olympic Auditorium on November 7, 1962. This was his final match, as he was nearly 50 years old and suffering from the effects of alcoholism. Gorgeous George appeared in one motion picture, Alias the Champ, made in 1949, which featured wrestler Tor Johnson.

== Retirement and death ==
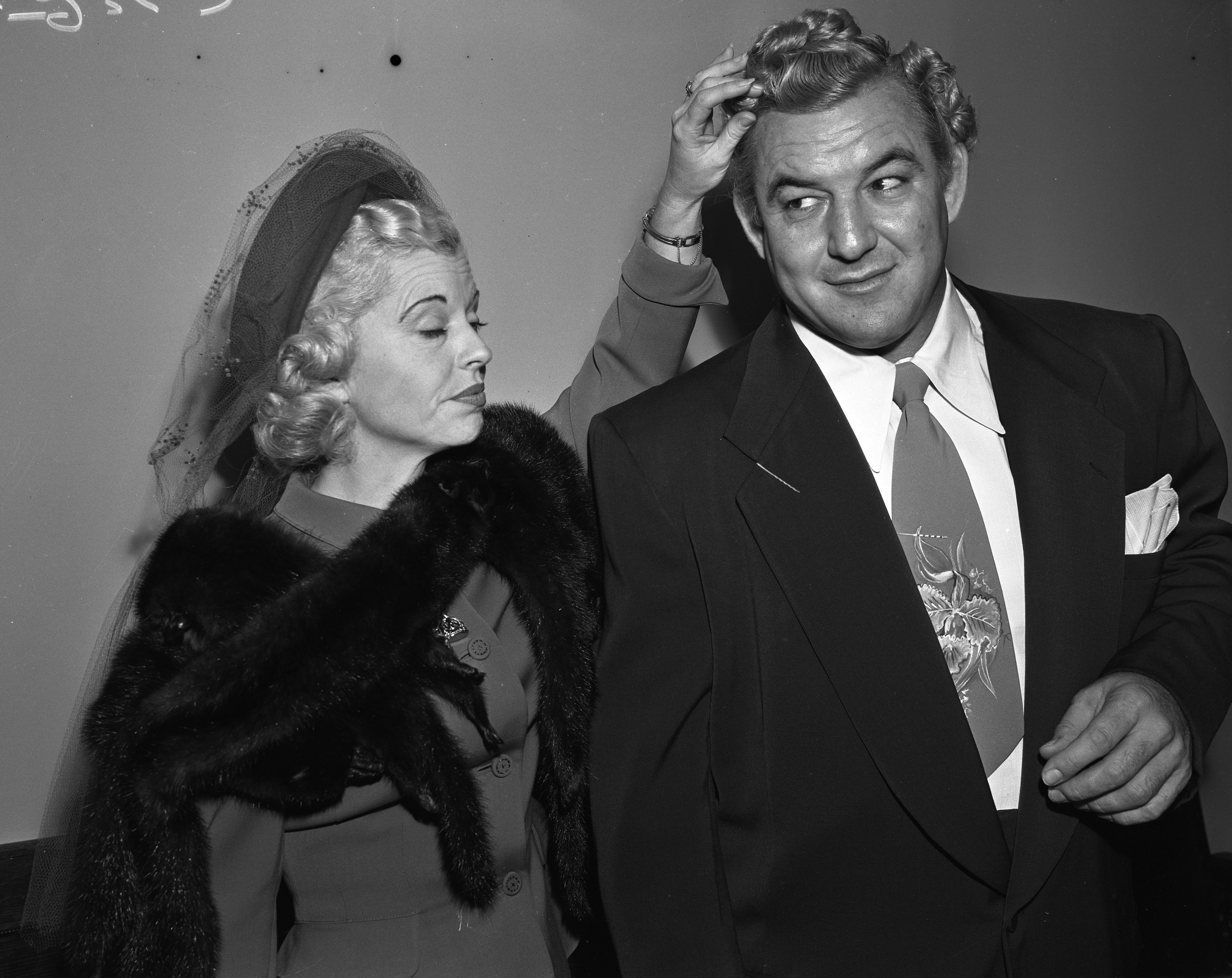
Gorgeous George and wife Betty, 1950

As his wrestling career wound down, Wagner invested US$250,000 in a 195-acre (0.79 km^{2}) turkey ranch built in Beaumont, California. He used his showman skills to promote his prized poultry at his wrestling matches and sport shows. He raised turkeys and owned a cocktail lounge in Van Nuys, California, which he named "Gorgeous George's Ringside Restaurant".

Wagner was diagnosed with liver cirrhosis in 1962 and his doctors instructed him to retire from wrestling. This, combined with financial troubles that stemmed from a recent divorce, worsened his health. He suffered a heart attack on December 24, 1963, and died two days later, at age 48. A plaque at his gravesite reads "Love to our Daddy Gorgeous George".

== Legacy ==
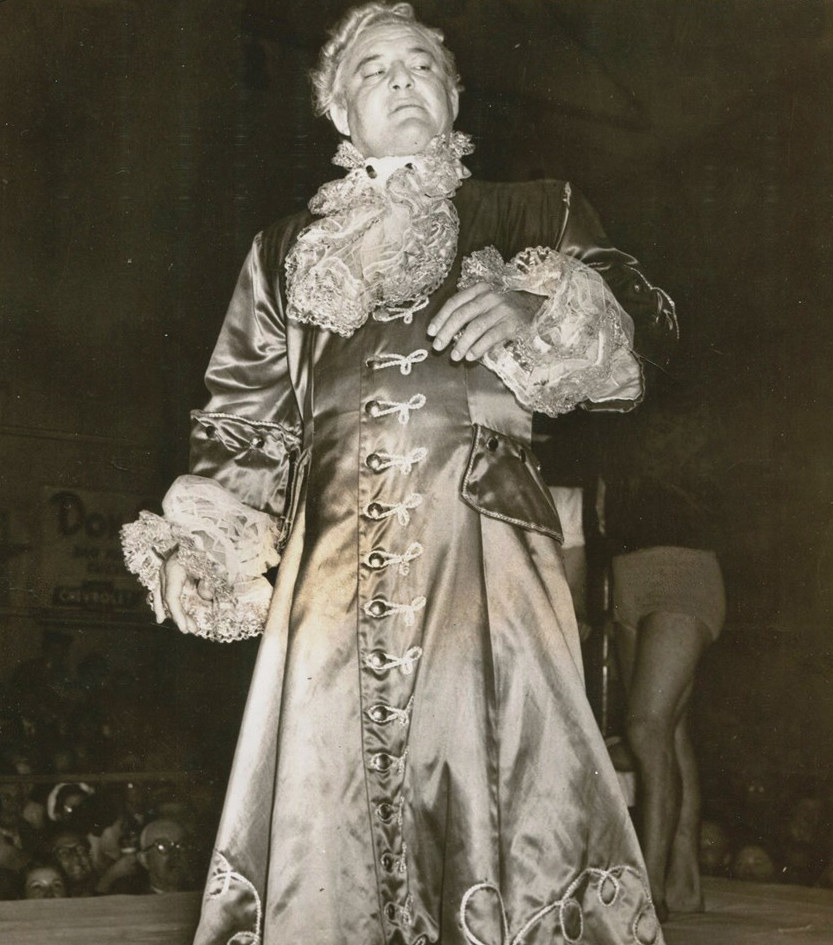
George pictured in 1954

Muhammad Ali and James Brown acknowledged that their own approach to flamboyant self-promotion was influenced by George. This was referenced in the 2021 movie One Night in Miami.... A 19-year-old Ali met a 46-year-old George at a Las Vegas radio station. During George's radio interview, the wrestler's promo caught the attention of the future heavyweight champion. If George lost to Classy Freddie Blassie, George exclaimed, "I'll crawl across the ring and cut my hair off! But that's not gonna happen because I'm the greatest wrestler in the world!"

Ali, who later echoed that very promo when taunting his opponent Sonny Liston, recalled, "I saw 15,000 people comin' to see this man get beat. And his talking did it. I said, 'This is a gooood idea!'" In the locker room afterward, the seasoned wrestler gave the future legend some invaluable advice: "A lot of people will pay to see someone shut your mouth. So keep on bragging, keep on sassing and always be outrageous."

In 2002, he was inducted into the inaugural class of the Pro Wrestling Hall of Fame (PWHF.org) by a committee of his peers. On March 27, he was inducted into the WWE Hall of Fame class of 2010. His 97-year-old former wife, Betty Wagner, accepted the honor on his behalf, answering questions and telling the story of how he became Gorgeous George.

In September 2008, the first full-length biography of Gorgeous George was published by HarperEntertainment Press. The title of the 304 page book is Gorgeous George: The Outrageous Bad Boy Wrestler who Created American Pop Culture by John Capouya. In the 2005 book I Feel Good: A Memoir in a Life of Soul, James Brown said he used many of Gorgeous George's antics to "create the James Brown you see on stage".

Bob Dylan said meeting George changed his life. In Dylan's book Chronicles: Volume One, Dylan recounts a story of meeting Gorgeous George in person. He wrote, "He winked and seemed to mouth the phrase, 'You're making it [the music] come alive.' I never forgot it. It was all the recognition and encouragement I would need for years."

The 1951 Warner Brothers Merrie Melodies cartoon Bunny Hugged featured the one-shot character "Ravishing Ronald", modeled after Gorgeous George. The Bowery Boys also lampooned Gorgeous George (with Huntz Hall as a much-heralded wrestler) in the 1952 feature No Holds Barred. Musical performers such as Liberace, Little Richard, Elton John, Prince and Morris Day show signs of the George meme.

Gorgeous George served as the namesake for a Daspletosaurus skeleton at the Field Museum of Natural History that occupied its main hall from 1956 to 1992 when it was moved to the upstairs fossil exhibit.

His theme tune "Pomp and Circumstance" was later also used as a theme tune by Randy Savage in the WWF 1985–1994 (a classical arrangement) and WCW 1994–1997 (a rock guitar arrangement).

Others in professional wrestling who have used the name "Gorgeous George" include Stephanie Bellars, Gorgeous George III and George Gillette, manager of Kendo Nagasaki.

The 1978 motion picture The One and Only starring Henry Winkler was loosely based on his career.

Rick "Lick" Joe, the Oklahoma based wrestler from the 1989 video game Violence Fight, has some styling cues resembling Gorgeous George, though with the "gorgeous" factor taken away.

In the 2000 movie Snatch, Adam Fogerty plays a bare fist fighter named Gorgeous George.

The film Queen of the Ring depicts Gorgeous George played by Adam Demos.

== Personal life ==
Wagner was married twice, first to Betty Hanson (1913–2011), whom he married in 1939 in Eugene, Oregon inside a wrestling ring. They adopted two children. In 1951, after divorcing Betty, he married Cherie Dupré (1927–2000). By this marriage, he had one biological son, Gary George. Cheri filed for divorce from George in April 1962.

Wagner's grandnephew Robert Kellum, best known as "The Maestro" in World Championship Wrestling, also wrestled as "Gorgeous George III" in the United States Wrestling Association.

== Championships and accomplishments ==
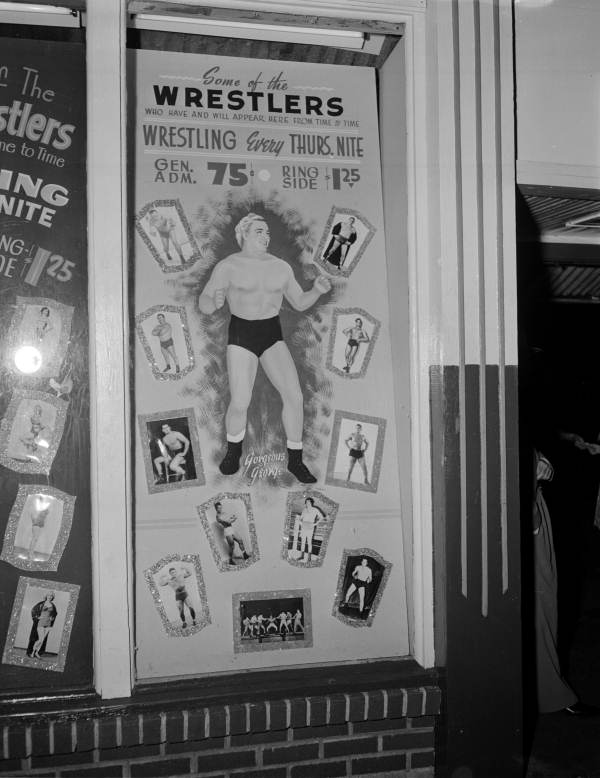
A Jacksonville, Florida poster advertises George

- American Wrestling Association (Boston)
  - AWA World Heavyweight Championship (1 time)
- Gulf Coast Championship Wrestling
  - NWA Gulf Coast Heavyweight Championship (1 time)
- International Professional Wrestling Hall of Fame
  - Class of 2023
- Mid-South Sports
  - NWA Southern Heavyweight Championship (Georgia version) (1 time)
- Professional Wrestling Hall of Fame
  - Charter member inducted in 2002
- Stampede Wrestling
  - Stampede Wrestling Hall of Fame (Class of 1995)
- World Wrestling Entertainment
  - WWE Hall of Fame (Class of 2010)
- Wrestling Observer Newsletter
  - Wrestling Observer Newsletter Hall of Fame (Class of 1996)
- Other titles
  - Pacific Coast Light Heavyweight Championship (2 times)
  - Pacific Northwest Middleweight Championship (1 time)
  - World Heavyweight Championship (Los Angeles version) (1 time)
  - Nebraska Pro Wrestling Hall of Fame (Class of 2020)

=== Luchas de Apuestas record ===
Winner (wager)	Loser (wager)	Location	Event	Date	Notes
Whipper Billy Watson (career)	Gorgeous George (hair)	Toronto, Ontario	Live Event	March 12, 1959	
The Destroyer (mask)	Gorgeous George (hair)	Los Angeles, California	Live Event	November 7, 1962	Gorgeous George's final match.

== See also ==
- List of premature professional wrestling deaths

== Notes ==
1. Originally a slogan of Arrid deodorant in the 1940s and 1950s: "Why be half-safe? Use Arrid to be sure."
