= Buddy Rogers =

Buddy Rogers may refer to:

- Charles "Buddy" Rogers (1904–1999), American actor and jazz musician
- Buddy Rogers (wrestler) (1921–1992), ring name of American professional wrestler Herman Rohde
