= Sulphur Springs Museum and Heritage Center =

Coordinates: 28°1′10.5″N 82°26′54″W

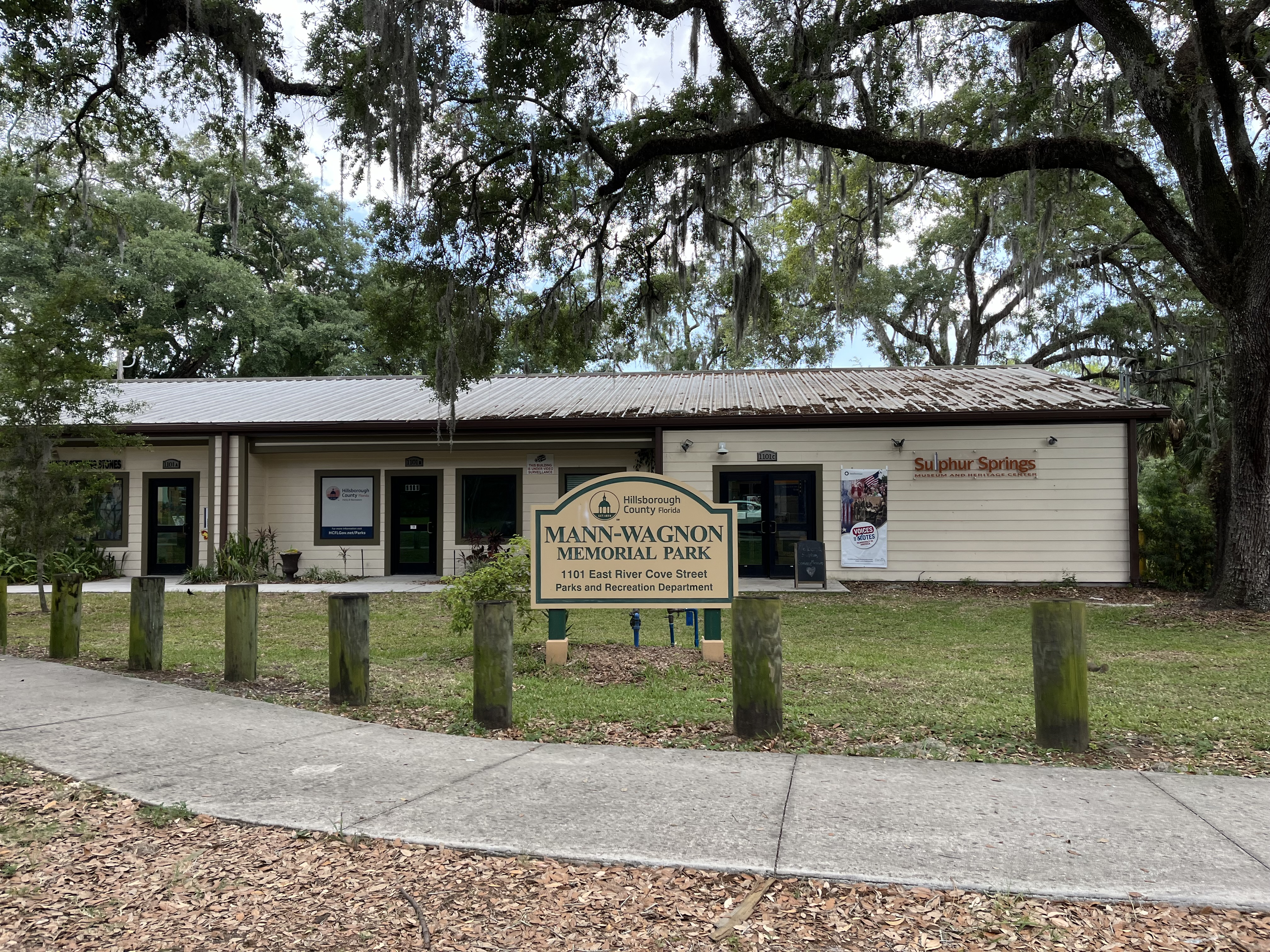
Museum exterior

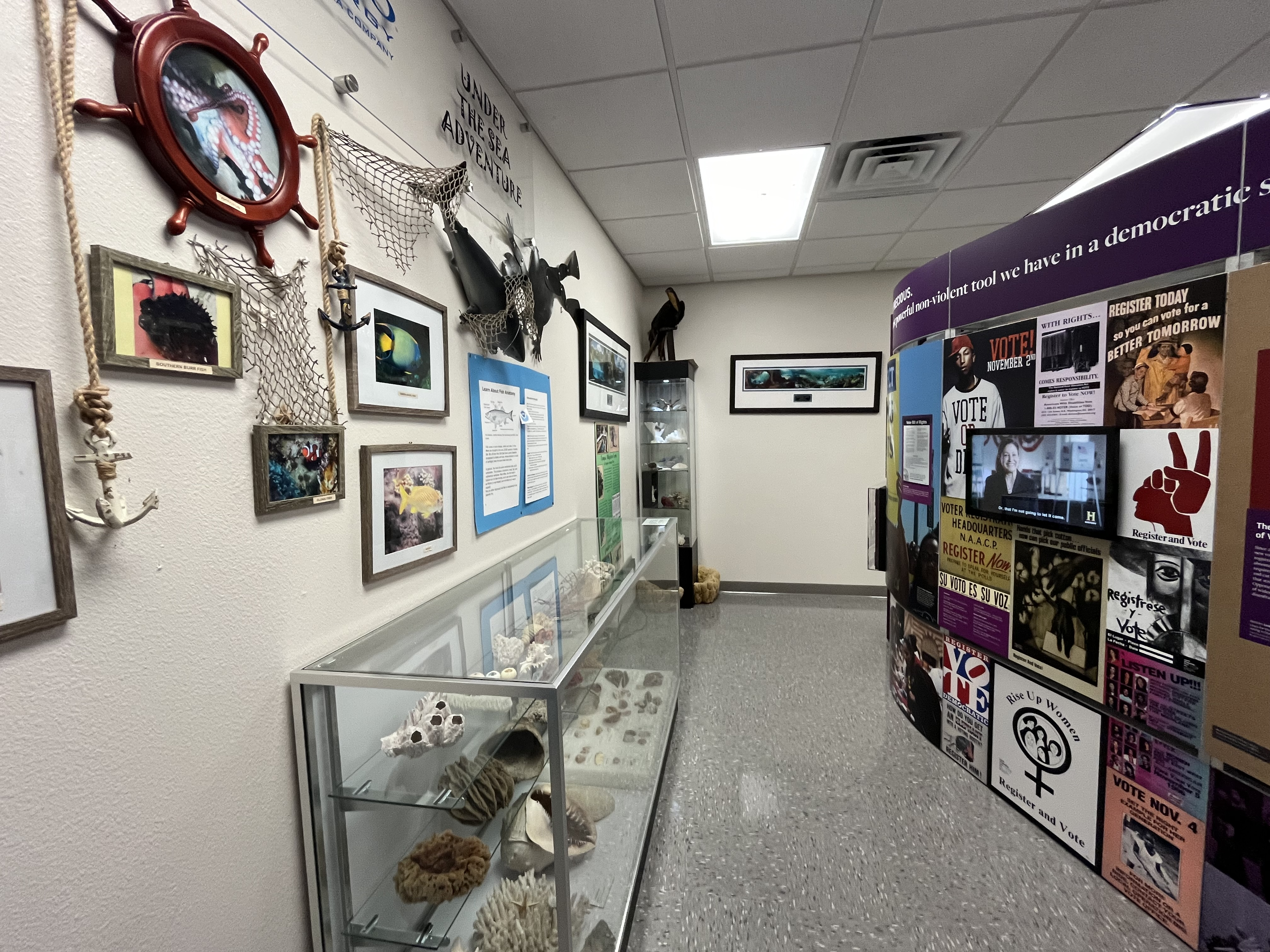
Museum interior

The Sulphur Springs Museum and Heritage Center is a local history museum in the Sulphur Springs neighborhood of Tampa, Florida. The museum was founded in 2006. It moved to its current location inside Mann-Wagnon Memorial Park in 2017. The museum is open Wednesday through Saturday from 11:00AM – 4:00PM and is located at 1101 East River Cove Street, Tampa, FL.

Amy Dao became the Museum’s director in January, 2022. Museum co-founder Norma Robinson was her predecessor.

In 2021, the Sulphur Springs Museum and Heritage Center was awarded a $6,500 grant from Florida Humanities as a part of the American Rescue Plan.

== Exhibitions ==
=== Permanent Exhibits ===
Sulphur Springs Museum and Heritage Center has three permanent exhibits. Sulphur Springs: An Enduring Legacy addresses the history of Sulphur Springs and major landmarks. Mann-Wagnon Park and the Natural History Museum focuses on the history center that used to reside in the park, until being moved to the Museum of Science and Industry in the 1970s. Finally, Spring Hill focuses on the history of Sulphur Springs during segregation.

From April 8 - July 2, 2022, the Sulphur Springs Museum is hosting the exhibit Have Blues, Will Travel: Traveling Blues Musicians in the Jim Crow Era. The exhibit highlights discrimination and violence that Black Blues artists endured, as well as how the Negro Motorist Green Book helped artists locate safe spots.

=== Past Exhibits ===
The Museum featured the Smithsonian traveling exhibit Water/Ways in 2017.

From October 3 through November 1, 2021 the Sulphur Springs Museum and Heritage Center hosted “The Art of Forensics” exhibit in collaboration with the University of South Florida. The exhibit uses artistic mediums including clay and photographs to engage the public in cold cases and attempt to solve them.

== Programs ==
The Kids' TECO Room, created through a donation from the Tampa Electric Company (TECO), is an ocean-themed space for children to engage in creative play and develop fine motor skills. The Sulphur Springs Transitioning Youth into Leaders program gives teenagers the opportunity to develop new skills while assisting with museum events and operations.

The museum offers events throughout the year for adults, including book talks and lectures, to promote lifelong learning. Major themes include Black culture and historical events that have impacted African Americans.
