= Learey Technical College =

College in Florida

Coordinates: 27.9967°N 82.4373°W

- Type: Vocational school
- Established: June 1993
- Principal: Tim Binder
- Academic staff: 14
- Location: Tampa, Florida, United States
- Campus: Urban
- Website: http://learey.mysdhc.org/

Learey Technical College (formally Fred D. Learey Technical College) is a public vocational school in Tampa, Florida. It is part of the Hillsborough County Public Schools system. It offers education in Emergency Medical Technician and Fire Fighter programs. Learey is located in a highly urbanized area, at 5410 North 20th Street, Tampa, Florida 33610, across the street from the much larger Erwin Technical Center. Learey has existed since June 1993.

== Facilities ==
The Learey building houses classes and the administrative offices. This is a two-story building, which measures 125 feet (38 m) by 100 feet (30 m). The entrance area, on the northeast corner, is designed to be an octagon. Learey only has about twelve parking spaces, so most students must park on nearby streets or in the Erwin Technical Center lots. Learey conducts some classes at Tampa's MacDill Air Force Base's New Education Center.
