= Erwin Technical College =

Coordinates: 27.9972°N 82.4358°W

- Type: Vocational school
- Established: 1925
- Chairman: Jeff Eakins, Superintendent of Hillsborough County Public Schools
- Academic staff: 75 persons in instruction and research
- Students: 810
- Undergraduates: 810
- Location: Tampa, Florida, United States
- Campus: Urban
- Website: www.erwin.edu

Erwin Technical College, sometimes known as D. G. Erwin Technical Center, is a public vocational school in Tampa, Florida. It is part of the Hillsborough County Public Schools system. It was founded in 1925.

Most classes and all administrative offices are located in the two-story main building. The building measures 380 feet (120 m) by 275 feet (84 m). An auto specialties training shop, one story tall, measures 200 feet (61 m) by 95 feet (29 m). The facility was originally built as a Sears department store in 1957.

Erwin has a large variety of programs, some of which may transfer as credit hours in the Florida Community College system or even to a few other colleges willing to accept them. According to the Hillsborough County Public Schools 2011-2012 Workforce & Continuing Education Guide Erwin has forty-two individual career class offerings.

Erwin has a few classes geared toward helping persons who need additional preparation to enroll in career classes. These include a class in General Educational Development (GED), English for Speakers of Other Languages (ESOL), and CARIBE. CARIBE (Career Recruitment and Instruction - Basic English) is a program for recent entrants to the United States from Cuba, Haiti, Colombia, Afghanistan, Vietnam and other entrants with refugee or asylee status. CARIBE provides free English language training, GED training and vocational training in the school district's vocational training programs.

All vocational courses at Erwin are approved by the Florida Board of Education.
